= American Chess Congress =

1857–1923 series of chess tournaments

The American Chess Congress was a series of chess tournaments held in the United States, a predecessor to the current U.S. Chess Championship. It had nine editions, the first played in October 1857 and the last in August 1923.

American Chess Congresses
#	Year	City	Winner
1	1857	New York	Paul Morphy (United States)
2	1871	Cleveland	George Henry Mackenzie (United States)
3	1874	Chicago	George Henry Mackenzie (United States)
4	1876	Philadelphia	James Mason (Ireland)
5	1880	New York	George Henry Mackenzie (United States)
6	1889	New York	Mikhail Chigorin (Russia); Max Weiss (Austria)
7	1904	St. Louis	Frank James Marshall (United States)
8	1921	Atlantic City	Dawid Janowski (France)
9	1923	Lake Hopatcong	Frank James Marshall (United States); Abraham Kupchik (United States)

== First American Chess Congress (1857) ==
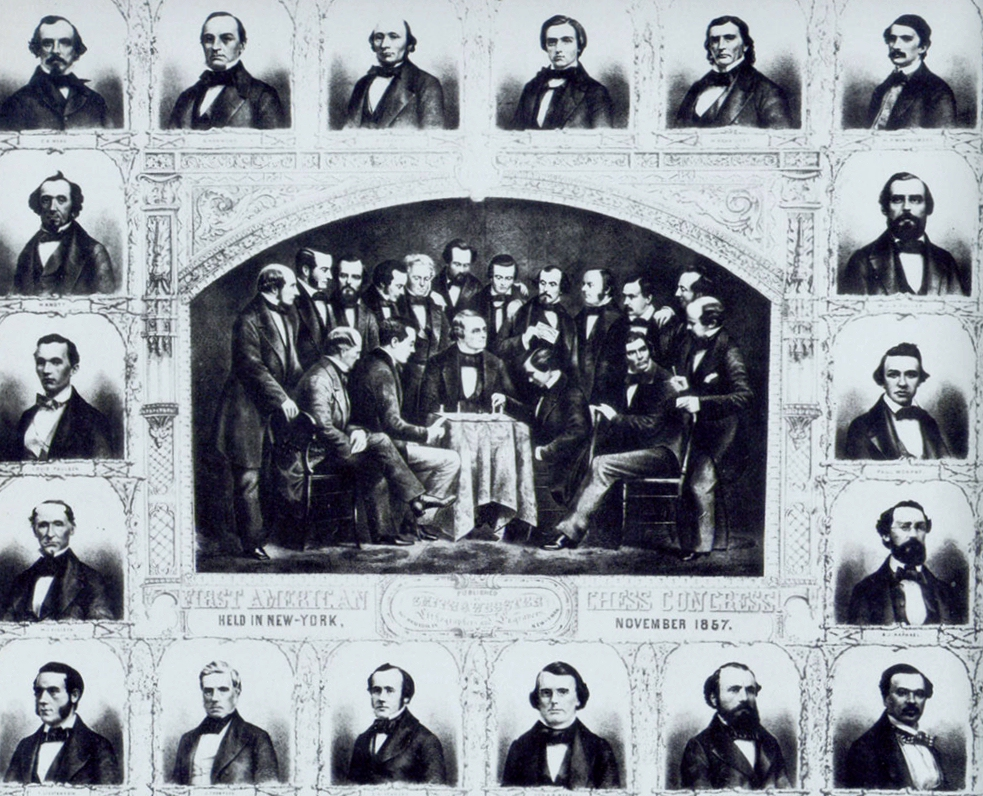

The first American Chess Congress, organized by Daniel Willard Fiske and held in New York, October 6 to November 10, 1857, was won by Paul Morphy. It was a knockout tournament in which draws did not count. The top sixteen American players were invited (William Allison, Samuel Robert Calthrop, Daniel Willard Fiske, William James Fuller, Hiram Kennicott, Hubert Knott, Theodor Lichtenhein, Napoleon Marache, Hardman Philips Montgomery, Alexander Beaufort Meek, Paul Morphy, Louis Paulsen, Frederick Perrin, Benjamin Raphael, Charles Henry Stanley, and James Thompson). First prize was $300. Morphy refused any money, but accepted a silver service consisting of a pitcher, four goblets, and a tray. Morphy's prize was given to him by Oliver Wendell Holmes Sr.

Shown on the right is lithograph of the First American Chess Congress 1857. All members of the Congress are shown, including those who did not play in the main tournament. Top row: Colonel Charles Mead (chairman), George Hammond, Frederic Perrin, Daniel Willard Fiske, Hiram Kennicott, and Hardman Philips Montgomery. Left column: Hubert Knott, Louis Paulsen, and William Allison. Bottom row: Theodore Lichtenhein, James Thompson, Charles Henry Stanley, Alexander Beaufort Meek, Samuel Robert Calthrop, and Napoleon Marache. Right column: William James Fuller, Paul Morphy, and Benjamin Raphael.

First round
Paul Morphy (USA)	+3=0
James Thompson (USA)	+0=0
William James Appleton Fuller (USA)	+2=0
Alexander Beaufort Meek (USA)	+3=0
Hubert Knott (USA)	+2=2
Frederick Perrin (USA)	+3=2
Theodor Lichtenhein (USA)	+3=0
Charles Henry Stanley (ENG)	+2=0
Benjamin Raphael (USA)	+3=1
Hiram Kennicott (USA)	+2=1
Daniel Fiske (USA)	+2=0
Napoleon Marache (USA)	+3=0
Samuel Robert Calthrop (ENG)	+0=0
Louis Paulsen (GER)	+3=0
William Allison (USA)	+1=0
Hardman Philips Montgomery (USA)	+3=0

Quarterfinals
Paul Morphy (USA)	+3=0
Alexander Beaufort Meek (USA)	+0=0
Frederick Perrin (USA)	+0=0
Theodor Lichtenhein (USA)	+3=0
Benjamin Raphael (USA)	+3=2
Napoleon Marache (USA)	+2=2
Louis Paulsen (GER)	+2=0
Hardman Philips Montgomery (USA)	+0=0

Semifinals
Paul Morphy (USA)	+3=1
Theodor Lichtenhein (USA)	+0=1
Benjamin Raphael (USA)	+0=1
Louis Paulsen (GER)	+3=1

Final
Paul Morphy (USA)	+5=2
Louis Paulsen (GER)	+1=2
Third place
Theodor Lichtenhein (USA)	+3=0
Benjamin Raphael (USA)	+0=0

== Second American Chess Congress (1871) ==
The second American Chess Congress was held in Cleveland on December 4–15, 1871 and won by George Henry Mackenzie. The first prize was $100 (~$1,500 today) and the total prize fund was $290 (~$5,000 today). The entry fee was $10 ($150 today). It was a double round robin tournament with a time limit of 12 moves an hour. Draw games were replayed. There were nine players (George Henry Mackenzie, Henry Hosmer, Frederick Elder, Max Judd, Preston Ware, Harsen Darwin Smith, Henry Harding, A. Johnston, and William Houghton). With the retirement of Morphy, this tournament was generally intended to recognize the best player in the United States.

	Player	1	2	3	4	5	6	7	8	9	Total wins
1	George Henry Mackenzie (USA)		1½0	½10	11	11	11	1½1	11	11	14
2	Henry Hosmer (USA)	0½1		11	1½1	00	01	11	11	11	12
3	Frederick Elder (USA)	½01	00		01	½½01	11	11	11	11	11
4	Max Judd (USA)	00	0½0	10		11	10	½11	½11	11	10
5	Preston Ware (USA)	00	11	½½10	00		01	10	11	11	9
6	Harsen Darwin Smith (USA)	00	10	00	01	10		11	11	11	9
7	Henry Harding (USA)	0½0	00	00	½00	01	00		01	11	4
8	A. Johnston (USA)	00	00	00	½00	00	00	10		11	3
9	William Houghton (USA)	00	00	00	00	00	00	00	00		0

== Third American Chess Congress (1874) ==
The third American Chess Congress was held in Chicago on July 7–16, 1874 and won by Mackenzie. There were eight players (Mackenzie, Hosmer, Judd, Bock, Elder, Perrin, Congdon, and Kennicott) and they had to pay a $20 entry fee. first place prize was $225. The tournament was again round robin, but for the first time draws were not replayed. The time control was 15 moves per hour. Elder and Kennicott withdrew before completing half their games, but their scores still counted.

#	Player	1	2	3	4	5	6	7	8	Total wins
1	George Henry Mackenzie (USA)		10	1½	11	--	11	11	11	10½
2	Henry Hosmer (USA)	01		10	11	--	11	11	11	10
3	Max Judd (USA)	0½	01		1½	--	11	11	--	7
4	Frederick Bock (USA)	00	00	0½		1½	11	1½	--	5½
5	Frederick Elder (USA)	--	--	--	0½		01	11	--	3½
6	Frederick Perrin (USA)	00	00	00	00	10		10	--	2
7	James Adams Congdon (USA)	00	00	00	0½	00	01		--	1½
8	Hiram Kennicott (USA)	00	00	--	--	--	--	--		0

== Fourth American Chess Congress (1876) ==
The fourth American Chess Congress (called the American Centennial Championship) was held in Philadelphia on August 17–31, 1876 and won by James Mason. There were nine players (Mason, Judd, Davidson, Henry Bird, Elson, Roberts, Ware, Barbour, and Martinez). The entry fee was $20. First place was $300. Never intended to recognize the best player in America, this tournament was geared towards attracting foreign masters, and to awarding the Governor Garland Silver Cup, as well as celebrating the American Centennial.

	Player	1	2	3	4	5	6	7	8	9	Total
1	James Mason (IRE)		1½	10	1½	½1	1½	11	½1	--	10½
2	Max Judd (USA)	0½		00	10	1½	11	11	11	--	9
3	Harry Davidson (USA)	01	11		½0	0½	½1	01	11	--	8½
4	Henry Edward Bird (ENG)	0½	01	½1		0½	11	½1	½1	--	8½
5	Jacob Elson (USA)	½0	0½	1½	1½		½½	10	11	--	8
6	Albert Roberts (USA)	0½	00	½0	00	½½		1½	11	--	5½
7	Preston Ware (USA)	00	00	10	½0	01	0½		½½	--	4
8	L.D. Barbour (USA)	½0	00	00	½0	00	00	½½		--	2
9	Dión Martinez (CUB)	00	--	½½	--	--	--	--	--		1

== Fifth American Chess Congress (1880) ==
The fifth American Chess Congress was held in New York on January 6–26, 1880 and won by Mackenzie (he beat James Grundy on tiebreak, 2–0). There were 10 players: Cohnfeld, Congdon, Eugene Delmar, Grundy, Judd, Mackenzie, Mohle, Ryan, Sellman, and Ware.

	Player	1	2	3	4	5	6	7	8	9	10	Total
1	George Henry Mackenzie (USA)		0½	10	½½	½1	11	11	11	1½	11	13½
2	James Grundy (USA)	1½		½½	10	1½	11	1½	01	11	11	13½
3	Charles Moehle (USA)	01	½½		0½	1½	10	11	11	11	11	13
4	Alexander Sellman (USA)	½½	01	1½		10	1½	11	0½	11	11	12½
5	Max Judd (USA)	½0	0½	0½	01		½1	11	11	01	11	11
6	Eugene Delmar (USA)	00	00	01	0½	½0		11	11	½1	11	9½
7	John Ryan (USA)	00	0½	00	00	00	00		11	01	11	5½
8	Preston Ware (USA)	00	10	00	1½	00	00	00		½1	1½	5½
9	James Adams Congdon (USA)	½0	00	00	00	10	½0	01	0½		00	3½
10	Albert Cohnfeld (USA)	00	00	00	00	00	00	00	0½	11		2½

== Sixth American Chess Congress (1889) ==
The sixth American Chess Congress was held in New York in 1889 (a 20-man double round-robin tournament; one of the longest tournaments in history). The event was won by Mikhail Chigorin and Max Weiss. Both finished with a score of 29 but Chigorin defeated Weiss in their individual game. The top American finisher was S. Lipschütz, who took sixth place (his supporters in the Eastern US tried to push his claim to being US Champion as a result of this tournament; however, Lipschütz's claim was not accepted by all). Under rules that reigning World Champion Wilhelm Steinitz helped to develop, the winner was to be regarded as World Champion for the time being, but must be prepared to face a challenge from the second- or third-placed competitor within a month. Mikhail Chigorin and Max Weiss tied for first, and remained tied after drawing all four games of a playoff. Weiss was not interested in playing a championship match, but Isidor Gunsberg, the third-place finisher, exercised his right and challenged Chigorin to a World Championship match. In 1890, he drew a first-to-10-wins match against Chigorin (9-9 with five draws). These were the same terms (9-9 draw clause) as the first World Championship match between Steinitz and Zukertort in 1886. They were also the same match terms that Bobby Fischer would insist on for his title defense in 1975.

	Player	1	2	3	4	5	6	7	8	9	10	11	12	13	14	15	16	17	18	19	20	Total
1	Mikhail Chigorin (RUS)		½1	00	½1	11	10	00	11	01	½1	11	11	½1	11	10	11	11	11	11	11	29
2	Max Weiss (AUT)	½0		½1	10	½½	½1	1½	11	11	11	10	½½	½1	10	11	11	½1	11	11	11	29
3	Isidor Gunsberg (ENG)	11	½0		01	½0	½0	1½	10	11	11	½1	11	01	11	01	11	11	11	11	11	28½
4	Joseph Henry Blackburne (ENG)	½0	01	10		01	10	10	01	11	10	11	11	11	11	11	10	11	½1	11	10	27
5	Amos Burn (ENG)	00	½½	½1	10		1½	00	11	11	10	11	11	01	00	11	01	11	11	11	11	26
6	S. Lipschütz (USA)	01	½0	½1	01	0½		½1	00	11	½1	10	½0	½1	11	11	11	10	11	11	11	25½
7	James Mason (IRE)	11	0½	0½	01	11	½0		½0	00	11	½0	10	01	01	½1	1½	½1	½½	11	11	22
8	Max Judd (USA)	00	00	01	10	00	11	½1		10	11	01	00	11	00	½1	½0	10	½1	11	11	20
9	Eugene Delmar (USA)	10	00	00	00	00	00	11	01		½0	10	11	0½	10	01	11	10	11	11	01	18
10	Jackson Showalter (USA)	½0	00	00	01	01	½0	00	00	½1		½1	10	10	10	11	½0	01	½1	11	11	18
11	William Pollock (ENG)	00	01	½0	00	00	01	½1	10	01	½0		01	½1	½1	01	11	00	00	11	11	17½
12	Henry Bird (ENG)	00	½½	00	00	00	½1	01	11	00	01	10		½0	11	½1	11	00	10	½0	11	17
13	Jean Taubenhaus (FRA)	½0	½0	10	00	10	½0	10	00	1½	01	½0	½1		01	00	0½	½1	10	11	11	17
14	David Graham Baird (USA)	00	01	00	00	11	00	10	11	01	01	½0	00	10		10	00	01	11	10	½1	16
15	Constant Ferdinand Burille (USA)	01	00	10	00	00	00	½0	½0	10	00	10	½0	11	01		½1	1½	00	½1	11	15
16	James Moore Hanham (USA)	00	00	00	01	10	00	0½	½1	00	½1	00	00	1½	11	½0		10	01	0½	11	14
17	George H. D. Gossip (ENG)	00	½0	00	00	00	01	½0	01	01	10	11	11	½0	10	0½	01		00	1½	00	13½
18	Dión Martinez (CUB)	00	00	00	½0	00	00	½½	½0	00	½0	11	01	01	00	11	10	11		01	01	13½
19	John Washington Baird (USA)	00	00	00	00	00	00	00	00	00	00	00	½1	00	01	½0	1½	0½	10		10	7
20	Nicholas MacLeod (CAN)	00	00	00	01	00	00	00	00	10	00	00	00	00	½0	00	00	11	10	01		6½

== Seventh American Chess Congress (1904) ==
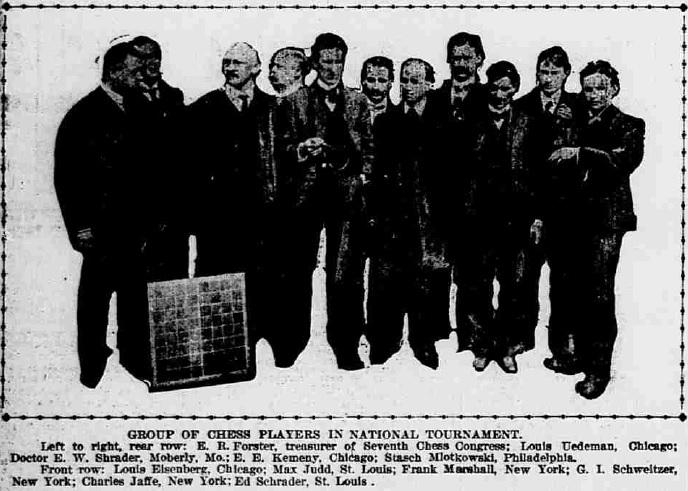
Group photo from the 1904 tournament

The seventh American Chess Congress was held in St. Louis in 1904. With US Champion Harry Nelson Pillsbury ill and dying, Max Judd tried to arrange the seventh ACC, with the stipulation that the US title be awarded to the winner. Judd disputed Pillsbury's ownership of the title by challenging the legitimacy of the whole succession since the time of Mackenzie, disputing Lipschutz's claim to have acquired the title at New York 1889, and everything that had happened since then. Pillsbury, from bed objected to Judd's plans, and prevailed on his friend, the lawyer Walter Penn Shipley, to intercede. Judd's tournament was held anyway, and said to be for "The United States Tourney Championship", a title explicitly said to have no relation to the United States Championship title held by Pillsbury. The tournament was won by Frank James Marshall, ahead of Judd. There were 10 players: Louis Eisenberg, Charles Jaffe, Judd, Kemeny, Marshall, Stasch Mlotkowski, Edward F. Schrader, Eugene Wesley Schrader, Schwietzer, and Louis Uedemann. The winner was actually named U.S. Champion at the conclusion of this tournament.

	Player	1	2	3	4	5	6	7	8	9	0	Total
1	Frank James Marshall (USA)		1	1	1	1	1	1	1	½	1	8½
2	Max Judd (USA)	0		0	1	1	1	1	1	1	1	7
3	Louis Uedemann (USA)	0	1		1	1	1	0	0	1	1	6
4	Emil Kemény (USA)	0	0	0		1	1	1	0	1	1	5
5	Edward F. Schrader (USA)	0	0	0	0		½	1	1	1	1	4½
6	Louis Eisenberg (USA)	0	0	0	0	½		1	1	1	1	4½
7	Charles Jaffe (USA)	0	0	1	0	0	0		1	1	1	4
8	George Schwietzer (USA)	0	0	1	1	0	0	0		0	1	3
9	Stasch Mlotkowski (USA)	½	0	0	0	0	0	0	1		1	2½
10	Eugene W. Schrader (USA)	0	0	0	0	0	0	0	0	0		0

== Eighth American Chess Congress (1921) ==
The eighth American Chess Congress was held in Atlantic City in 1921. The event was won by Dawid Janowski, followed by Norman Whitaker, Jaffe, etc. There were 12 players: Samuel Factor, Hago, Harvey, Jackson, Jaffe, Janowski, Marshall, Mlotkowski, Sharp, Vladimir Sournin, Isador Turover, and Whitaker.

	Player	1	2	3	4	5	6	7	8	9	0	1	2	Total
1	Dawid Janowski (FRA)		0	1	½	½	1	½	1	1	1	1	1	8½
2	Norman Tweed Whitaker (USA)	1		0	1	1	1	0	1	0	1	1	1	8
3	Charles Jaffe (USA)	0	1		1	1	0	0	1	1	0	1	1	7
4	Martin D. Hago (USA)	½	0	0		½	½	1	½	1	½	1	1	6½
5	Samuel Factor (USA)	½	0	0	½		½	0	1	½	1	1	1	6
6	Frank James Marshall (USA)	0	0	1	½	½		1	0	½	½	1	1	6
7	Vladimir Sournin (USA)	½	1	1	0	1	0		0	½	½	1	½	6
8	Sydney T. Sharp (USA)	0	0	0	½	0	1	1		½	½	1	1	5½
9	Isador Samuel Turover (USA)	0	1	0	0	½	½	½	½		1	1	½	5½
10	Stasch Mlotkowski (USA)	0	0	1	½	0	½	½	½	0		1	1	5
11	J. B. Harvey (USA)	0	0	0	0	0	0	0	0	0	0		1	1
12	Edward Schuyler Jackson (USA)	0	0	0	0	0	0	½	0	½	0	0		1

== Ninth American Chess Congress (1923) ==
The ninth and last American Chess Congress was held in Hotel Alamac in Lake Hopatcong, New Jersey on August 6–21, 1923. The tournament was played between 14 players: Horace Bigelow, Roy Turnbull Black, Oscar Chajes, Albert Hodges, Dawid Janowski, Abraham Kupchik, Edward Lasker, Frank James Marshall, John Stuart Morrison, Marvin Palmer, Anthony Santasiere, Morris Schapiro, Vladimir Sournin, and Oscar Tenner. It ended with a tie between Marshall and Kupchik scoring 10½ out of 13.

	Player	1	2	3	4	5	6	7	8	9	0	1	2	3	4	Total
1	Frank James Marshall (USA)		1	½	1	½	1	1	1	1	½	½	1	½	1	10½
2	Abraham Kupchik (USA)	0		1	0	1	½	1	1	1	1	1	1	1	1	10½
3	Dawid Janowski (FRA)	½	0		1	½	½	1	1	1	1	1	1	½	1	10
4	Edward Lasker (USA)	0	1	0		½	1	1	1	0	1	1	1	½	1	9
5	Morris Schapiro (USA)	½	0	½	½		1	0	½	1	½	1	1	1	1	8½
6	Roy Turnbull Black (USA)	0	½	½	0	0		1	0	1	0	1	1	1	1	7
7	Oscar Tenner (USA)	0	0	0	0	1	0		1	½	1	1	0	1	1	6½
8	Oscar Chajes (USA)	0	0	0	0	½	1	0		1	1	0	1	1	1	6½
9	Vladimir Sournin (USA)	0	0	0	1	0	0	½	0		1	1	1	½	½	5½
10	John Stuart Morrison (CAN)	½	0	0	0	½	1	0	0	0		½	½	1	1	5
11	Albert Hodges (USA)	½	0	0	0	0	0	0	1	0	½		½	1	½	4
12	Marvin Palmer (USA)	0	0	0	0	0	0	1	0	0	½	½		1	0	3
13	Anthony Santasiere (USA)	½	0	½	½	0	0	0	0	½	0	0	0		½	2½
14	Horace Bigelow (USA)	0	0	0	0	0	0	0	0	½	0	½	1	½		2½

== See also ==
- U.S. Chess Championship
- U.S. Women's Chess Championship
- U.S. Open Chess Championship
- U.S. Women's Open Chess Championship
