= William H. K. Pollock =

English chess player

William Pollock
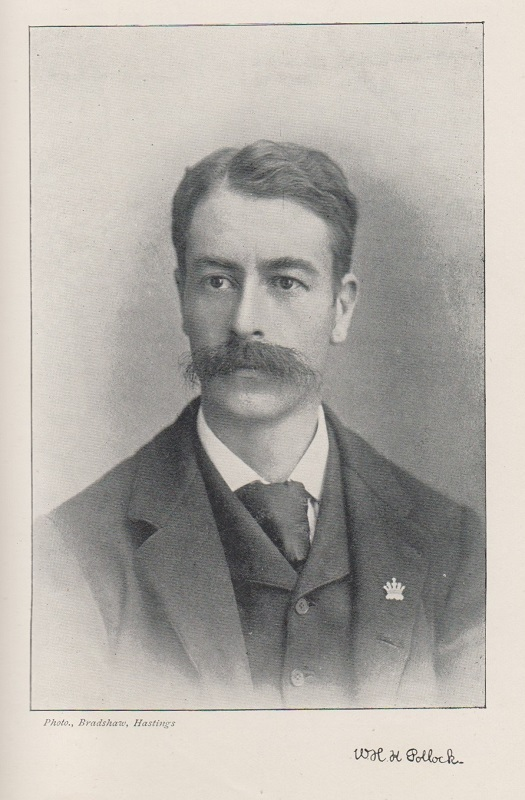

Personal information
- Born: William Henry Krause Pollock; 21 February 1859 Cheltenham, England
- Died: 5 October 1896 (aged 37) Clifton, Bristol, England

Chess career
- Country: England
- Title: Master

William Henry Krause Pollock (21 February 1859 – 5 October 1896) was an English chess master, and a surgeon.

== Early life ==
Pollock was born in Cheltenham, England, the son of the Rev. William J. Pollock and Eliza Angelina Krause (daughter of Rev. William Henry Krause). He was educated at Clifton College. He studied medicine in Dublin, Ireland, from 1880 to 1882, at which time he was a member of the Dublin Chess Club. In 1882, he became a licentiate of the Royal College of Surgeons in Dublin. In the same year, his first published chess game and problem appeared in the Irish publication The Practical Farmer. After receiving his medical licence, Pollock moved back to England and became a surgeon.

== Chess career ==
Pollock tied for 1st–3rd in the B section at Bath 1884, scoring 7 points out of 10 games. In a stronger tournament, the British Chess Association Congress held at London 1885, he finished 4th with 10½/15, behind Isidor Gunsberg, Henry Edward Bird and Anthony Guest. He tied for 8–10th in the Master Tournament at Hereford, scoring 3/10; Blackburne won, ahead of Bird and Schallop. In the British Chess Club Master Tourney (London 1886), he finished 5th of 8 players, scoring 3/7, behind Blackburne, Bird, Gunsberg, and James Mason. In the 2nd British Chess Federation Championship, also held at London 1886, he finished 10th of 13 players (4½/12), but had the consolation of handing tournament winner Blackburne one of his two losses. At Nottingham 1886, he finished 7th of 10 players (3/9), behind Burn, Schallopp, Gunsberg, Johannes Zukertort, Bird, and Jean Taubenhaus. He tied for 3rd–5th of 7 players (3/6) at Stamford 1887, won by Joseph Henry Blake. At London 1887, the 3rd British Chess Federation Congress, he finished 5th of 10 players (4/9), behind Burn, Gunsberg, Blackburne, and Zukertort. At Bradford 1888, the 4th British Chess Federation Championship, he tied with Bird for 9th–10th place out of 17 players (7/16); Gunsberg won. He tied for 5–6th of 10 players at London 1888 (Simpson's Divan), also won by Gunsberg.

Pollock returned to Ireland to win the Irish Chess Association Masters tournament at Dublin 1885 with 9 out of 10 points. He won Belfast 1886 (ahead of Joseph Henry Blackburne and Amos Burn) with a rare perfect score of 8–0. He took 2nd at Dublin 1889.

In 1889, Pollock made the voyage to New York City to participate in the prestigious New York International Chess Tournament, the Sixth American Chess Congress. One of the longest tournaments in history, this double round robin was intended to select a challenger for the world championship title held by William Steinitz. Pollock finished 11th out of 20 players; Mikhail Chigorin and Max Weiss won. He later moved to Baltimore as the resident chess professional, and soon was writing a chess column for the Baltimore Sunday News, as well as reports on American chess for the British Chess Magazine. In 1890, he won a match against Charles Moehle 7½–6½ in New York, took 2nd place at the St. Louis Chess Congress, and played in Chicago. He lost a match to Eugene Delmar 3–5 at Skaneateles 1891, shared 1st with Jackson Showalter but lost a playoff game at Lexington 1891.

In 1892, he was Wilhelm Steinitz's secretary. At tournaments in New York in 1893, he tied for 4–5th, and tied for 9–11th in New York (Emanuel Lasker won).

In early 1895, he drew a match in Montreal against George H. D. Gossip, each player winning six games with five draws. This result was likely more satisfactory to Gossip than to Pollock, given Gossip's status as a perennial last-place finisher in major tournaments. Later that year, Pollock represented Canada at the famous Hastings 1895 chess tournament, won by Harry Nelson Pillsbury. Pollock took 19th (out of 22), including wins over the 4th and 5th-place finishers Siegbert Tarrasch and Wilhelm Steinitz.

Following the tournament, Pollock's health progressively deteriorated due to tuberculosis. With James Mason, Pollock co-wrote his sole chess book: Games in the St. Petersburg Tournament, 1895–96, which still stands today as the best source for coverage of this tournament. In August 1896, Pollock returned to England, where he died at his father's home in Clifton on 5 October 1896.

== Notable games ==
Pollock won the brilliancy prize for this scintillating victory over Max Weiss, who tied for first at the great New York 1889 tournament, which was intended to select a challenger for the world championship title then held by William Steinitz. Steinitz wrote of the game, "Mr. Pollock's play from the 17th move renders this game one of the finest monuments of chess ingenuity, and altogether it belongs to the most brilliant gems in the annals of practical play."

"Weiss vs. Pollock, New York 1889".

Position: h1 white king, f1 white rook, e1 black queen, c1 white bishop, a1 white rook, g2 white pawn, f2 black bishop, d2 white knight, b2 white pawn, h3 white pawn, d3 black knight, c3 white pawn, b4 white pawn, h5 white queen, b5 black pawn, a6 black pawn, h7 black pawn, g7 black pawn, f7 black pawn, c7 black pawn, g8 black king, e8 black rook, a8 black rook

Position after 19.h3

Position: g1 black bishop, f1 white knight, a1 white rook, g2 white pawn, e2 black knight, b2 white pawn, h3 white pawn, e3 black rook, c3 white pawn, b4 white pawn, h5 black pawn, g5 white king, d5 white queen, b5 black pawn, g6 black pawn, a6 black pawn, f7 black pawn, c7 black pawn, g8 black king, a8 black rook

Position after 26.Kg5

1.e4 e5 2.Nf3 Nc6 3.Bb5 a6 4.Ba4 Nf6 5.d3 b5 6.Bb3 Bc5 7.c3 d5!? 8.exd5 Nxd5 9.Qe2 0-0 10.Qe4 Be6 11.Nxe5 Nxe5 12.Qxe5 Nb4!? 13.0-0 13.Qxc5?? Nxd3+ wins White's queen. After 13.cxb4 Bxb4+, 14.Nd2 (or 14.Bd2 or 14.Kf1) Bxb3 regains the sacrificed piece because of the threatened 15...Re8. In this line, the alternative 14.Kd1 Qxd3+ 15.Nd2 Bxb3+ 16.axb3 Rfe8 17.Qg3 Qe2+ 18.Kc2 Rad8 gives Black a murderous attack, e.g. 19...Qe6 20.Qf3 Rd4 21.Kb1 Red8 or 19.Qf4 Qd3+ 20.Kd1 Qxb3#. 13...Nxd3 White has a difficult game, for example 14.Qe2 Bxb3 15.axb3 Re8 16.Be3? Nxf2! 14.Qh5 Bxb3 15.axb3 Re8 16.Nd2 Qe7! 17.b4 The natural 17.Nf3? would be met by 17...Nxf2! 18.Rxf2 Qe1+ 19.Nxe1 Rxe1#). 17...Bxf2+! 18.Kh1 18.Rxf2? loses to 18...Nxf2 19.Kxf2 Qe3+ 20.Kf1 Qe1#. 18...Qe1! 19.h3 (diagram) Nxc1!! Steinitz wrote, "This sacrifice of the queen for no more than two pieces is based on a most profound and brilliant idea, such as has very rarely occurred in actual play." 20.Rxe1 Rxe1+ 21.Kh2 Bg1+ 22.Kg3 Re3+ 23.Kg4 After 23.Nf3, Black mates with 23...Ne2+ 24.Kg4 Re4+ 25.Kg5 Be3+ (or 25...f6+) 26.Kf5 Ng3#. 23...Ne2 Threatening to win White's queen with 24...Rg3+ 25.Kf5 g6+. 24.Nf1 g6 25.Qd5 After 25.Qh6, Black wins with 25...Rae8!, e.g. 26.Nxe3 Bxe3 winning the queen, or 26.g3 R8e4+ 27.Kg5 Rxg3+ 28.Nxg3 Be3+ 29.Kf6 Re6#. 25...h5+ 26.Kg5 (diagram) Kg7!! A quiet move, offering to sacrifice either rook. 27.Nxe3 If 27.Qxa8, 27...f6+ 28.Kh4 Bf2+ 29.g3 Rxg3! 30.Nxg3 Bxg3#. 27.Qd7 is met by 27...Re5+ 28.Kh4 Kh6 threatening 29...g5#. 27...f6+ 28.Kh4 Bf2+ 29.g3 Bxg3# 0–1

Pollock won the following game as Black against W. Haller at St. Louis in 1890. Fred Reinfeld wrote that this "sparkling little game shows him at his best."

"Haller vs. Pollock, St. Louis 1890".

Position: e1 white rook, d1 white king, c1 white bishop, a1 white rook, h2 white pawn, g2 white pawn, f2 white pawn, d2 white pawn, c2 white pawn, f3 white knight, b3 white pawn, f4 white queen, e4 white knight, b4 black knight, e6 black bishop, h7 black pawn, g7 black pawn, f7 black pawn, d7 black queen, c7 black pawn, b7 black pawn, a7 black pawn, h8 black rook, f8 black bishop, d8 black rook, c8 black king

Position after 12.axb3

Position: e1 white rook, d1 white king, c1 white bishop, h2 white pawn, g2 white pawn, f2 white pawn, d2 white pawn, c2 black knight, c3 white knight, b3 white pawn, f4 white queen, e5 white knight, b5 black queen, e6 black bishop, h7 black pawn, g7 black pawn, f7 black pawn, c7 black pawn, b7 black pawn, a7 white rook, h8 black rook, f8 black bishop, d8 black rook, b8 black king

Position after 15.Nc3

1.e4 e5 2.Nc3 Nf6 3.Bc4 Nxe4 4.Nxe4 Allowing Black immediate equality, at least. The main line is 4.Qh5 Nd6 5.Bb3 (5.Qxe5+ Qe7 is equal), which may lead to wild complications after 5...Nc6!? (The quiet 5...Be7 6.Nf3 Nc6 7.Nxe5 g6 8.Qe2 Nd4 9.Qd3 Nxb3 10.axb3 Nf5 11.0-0 d6 led to equality in Anand–Ivanchuk, Roquebrune 1992.) 6.Nb5! g6 7.Qf3 f5 8.Qd5 Qe7 9.Nxc7+ Kd8 10.Nxa8 b6, the so-called Frankenstein–Dracula Variation. 4...d5 5.Qh5? dxc4 6.Qxe5+ Be6 7.Nf3 White has played the opening weakly; here he could snatch a pawn with 7.Qb5+ Nc6 8.Qxb7, but 8...Bd5 would give Black a won game. 7...Nc6 8.Qf4 Nb4! 9.Kd1 Qd7 10.Re1 The immediate 10.b3 was better. 10...0-0-0 11.b3 cxb3 12.axb3 (diagram) Nxc2! 13.Rxa7 13.Kxc2? Qd3+ mates next move. 13...Kb8 14.Ne5 Qb5 15.Nc3 (diagram) Bxb3! 16.Bb2 16.Nxb5? Nd4# 16...Nb4+ 17.Kc1 Qxe5! Steinitz wrote, "A charming termination to a beautifully played game." Irving Chernev noted that 17...Nd3+! would also have won. 18.Qxe5 Nd3+ 19.Kb1 Nxe5 20.Ra5 Nc4 21.Rb5 Nxd2+ 0–1

== Books ==
- James Mason and W. H. K. Pollock (1896). Games in the St. Petersburg Tournament, 1895-96. Whitehead and Miller, Printers.
- Urcan, Olimpiu G.; Hilbert, John S. (2017). W. H. K. Pollock: A Chess Biography with 532 Games. McFarland. ISBN 978-0786458684.
