= Horace Bigelow =

Horace Ransom Bigelow (6 March 1898 – 18 April 1980) was an American chess master and organizer.

== Biography ==
He learned chess at the age of ten in Lucerne, Switzerland. Several years later, he played chess with Count Antonio Sacconi in a Jesuit boarding school at Villa Mondragone, Frascati, a few miles outside of Rome, and became an Oxford University Champion. He took 3rd, behind Edward Guthlac Sergeant and Max Euwe, at Bromley 1920 (Section B), and took 3rd at Malvern 1921 (the 14th BFC Congress, Minor Tournament). Then he moved to the United States.

He divided the third prize with Jacob Bernstein, Dawid Janowski, and ten-year-old Samuel Reshevsky at New York 1922 (the first prize was won by Edward Lasker, and the second prize by Charles Jaffe), tied for 13-14th at Lake Hopatcong, New Jersey 1923 (the 9th American Chess Congress, Frank Marshall and Abraham Kupchik won), took 6th at New York 1924 (The Dimock Theme Tournament, Marshall won ahead of Carlos Torre), took 10th at Bradley Beach 1929 (Alexander Alekhine won), and tied for 6-8th at New York 1929 (Sidney Norman Bernstein and Smirka won).

He was, as a prominent member of the Manhattan Chess Club, one of organizers of the New York 1924 chess tournament won by Emanuel Lasker ahead of José Raúl Capablanca. He edited a chess column in the New York Evening Post, and the Liberty magazine.
