= Isador Samuel Turover =

American chess master

- Born: 1892; Poland
- Died: 16 October 1978 (aged 85–86)
- Occupations: Chess player Lumber mill owner
- Known for: Director of the American Chess Foundation
- Spouse: Bessie Levin
- Children: 3

Isador (Isaac) Samuel Turover (Sochaczew, 8 July 1892 – 16 October 1978) was an American chess master.

== Biography ==
Born to a Jewish family in Poland, he moved to Belgium and then to the United States. He was a champion of Baltimore from 1918 to 1921, won the Washington D.C. championship in 1918 ahead of F. B. Walker and took 2nd, behind Vladimir Sournin, in the D.C. championship in 1920, tied for 8th at Atlantic City 1921 (the Eighth American Chess Congress; Dawid Janowski won), tied for 4th at Bradley Beach, New Jersey 1928 (Abraham Kupchik won), tied for 3rd at Bradley Beach 1929 (Alexander Alekhine won), took 8th at New York 1931 (José Raúl Capablanca won), and took 10th at Ventnor City, New Jersey 1944 (Jacob Levin won).

Turover settled in the Washington area and had a very successful lumber business. He married Bessie Levin and had three daughters: Sylvia, Naomi and Ruth. Turover became a director of the American Chess Foundation. He is also known as a chess patron and philanthropist. He sponsored Bobby Fischer's attendance in the 1962 Stockholm Interzonal. Throughout his life he offered cash prizes and other awards for brilliancies in chess games. For instance, in 1930, Turover gave a 500-lire brilliancy prize at the tournament in San Remo. Many years later, in 1973, Turover awarded David Bronstein two magnum bottles of the finest French champagne for a brilliancy in a game against Ljubomir Ljubojević. In 1974 he established the annual World Brilliancy Prize; the first winner was Michael Stean, who received $1,000 for his win against Walter Browne at the 21st Chess Olympiad in Nice.
