= Norman T. Whitaker =

American lawyer and con man

Norman T. Whitaker, 1969

Norman Tweed Whitaker (April 9, 1890 – May 20, 1975) was an American International Master of chess, a lawyer, a civil servant, and a chess author. He was convicted of several crimes, was disbarred from the practice of law, and served several terms in prison. His most infamous criminal escapade was a confidence trick involving the Lindbergh kidnapping in 1932.

== Early life, family and education ==
Whitaker was born in Philadelphia, and grew up in an upper middle class, socially prominent family. His father, Dr. Herbert Whitaker, was a respected mathematics teacher with a doctorate from the University of Pennsylvania, while his mother was well known as a champion whist player. Norman attended high school there, graduating in 1908, and was involved in many extra-curricular school activities. Whitaker graduated from the University of Pennsylvania with a Bachelor's degree in German Literature. He graduated from Georgetown University with a law degree.

== Chess involvement ==
Whitaker was taught to play chess at the age of 14 by his father and learned more by watching Harry Nelson Pillsbury, one of the world's very best, play in 1905.

Whitaker was a member of the Franklin Mercantile Chess Club in Philadelphia, the nation's second-oldest chess club, and represented Franklin in team matches. This club was named in honor of Benjamin Franklin, a Philadelphia chess enthusiast and one of the most prominent Americans of the 18th century. During Whitaker's early chess years, the Franklin club featured the strong veteran Master Walter Penn Shipley, a lawyer by profession and an experienced chess organizer and promoter.

Whitaker in his teens won high-quality games in simultaneous exhibitions against World Chess Champion Emanuel Lasker and future world champion Jose Raul Capablanca. Lasker was in Philadelphia to play part of his World Chess Championship 1907 match against Frank Marshall; Lasker won that match. While not of competitive significance, these achievements by Whitaker boosted his confidence and spurred his further development as a rising talent.

While attending the University of Pennsylvania, which he represented successfully in intercollegiate team play, Whitaker also represented the United States against England in two transatlantic cable university challenge matches, winning his 1909 game and drawing in 1910.

=== Reaches Master strength ===
One of Whitaker’s earliest notable performances at master level came at the 1913 New York National round-robin tournament. Despite its title, the event did not hold official national championship status and included several international participants. The field featured future World Chess Champion Jose Raul Capablanca, who won the tournament, along with American champion Frank Marshall, former World Championship challenger Dawid Janowski, Charles Jaffe, and Oscar Chajes. Whitaker finished tied for eighth and ninth place with a score of 5.5/13.

Whitaker challenged Marshall in early 1914 to a match for the U.S. title, held by Marshall, but the two could not agree on financial terms.

Whitaker competed frequently and successfully in the Western Open during his college years and afterwards; organized by the Western Chess Association, this was often the nation's strongest-field annually-staged tournament in that era. This tournament later became known as the U.S. Open Chess Championship. During this era, it was an elite round-robin format event.

His major results from this period: 16th Western Open, Excelsior, Minnesota 1915–8.5/10, second place, winner Jackson Showalter; 17th Western Open, Chicago 1916–13.5/19, tied 4-5th, winner Edward Lasker.

By 1918, he was one of the strongest players in the country, defeating former U.S. champion Showalter in a match, by a score of +4 -1 =3. This was actually the second match between the two: Showalter had dominated their contest in 1916 by +6 -1 =0.

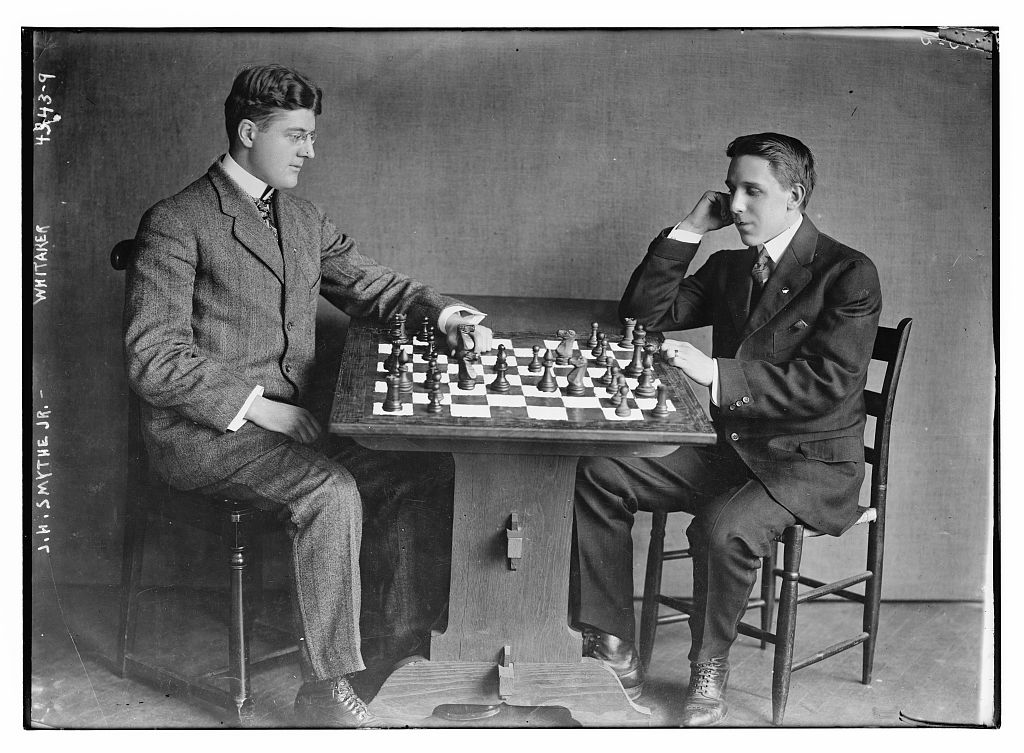
Whitaker with John H. Smythe Jr

In 1920, Whitaker represented Washington, D.C. against Chicago in what is believed to have been the first American shortwave radio long-distance chess match. He faced the very experienced master Edward Lasker. A pre-arranged time limit of three hours for the game found it still unfinished after 25 moves, with Whitaker having a slight advantage, and Capablanca adjudicated the position as a win for Whitaker.

=== Peak performance ===
In 1921, at Atlantic City, he placed clear second, and top American, in the Eighth American Chess Congress. This series of nine tournaments, staged at irregular intervals between 1857 and 1923, was the forerunner to the modern United States Chess Championship tournament series. Whitaker finished with 8/11, only half a point behind winner Janowski, and ahead of Marshall, both of whom he defeated head-to-head. This was arguably his peak lifetime performance.

Whitaker was then scheduled to play a match against Marshall for the U.S. Chess Championship, but did not show up. He had been arrested and criminally charged in November 1921 (see below), and this was the likely reason for cancellation of the match.

=== Wins Western Open ===
Whitaker was a regular challenger for top places in the Western Open, held annually in the midwest, south, or far west. In 1921, at Cleveland (22nd Western), he placed fourth with 8/11; Edward Lasker won with 9.5. In 1922, at Louisville (23rd Western), he placed clear second with 9/11, half a point behind champion Samuel Factor. He tied with Stasch Mlotkowski for the title in 1923 at San Francisco (24th Western) with 9/11. At Detroit 1924 (25th Western), he tied 2nd-4th with 11.5/16, but a young Mexican Carlos Torre Repetto dominated with 14.

=== Represents U.S. in international chess ===
In 1927, following release from prison, he won a nine-player invitational round-robin event, which was the first National Chess Federation Congress, in Kalamazoo, Michigan, ahead of the teenaged Samuel Reshevsky, who was already Master strength, and who later became one of the world's top players. Based on this result, with 6.5/8 -- Whitaker was declared champion of the NCF, a predecessor of the United States Chess Federation (USCF). However, despite winning this title, Whitaker was not even invited to participate in the championship the following year, held at Bradley Beach, New Jersey; this situation indicates conflict with chess administrators, likely over his criminal past.

In 1928, while on his honeymoon, Whitaker went to The Hague to represent the United States in the Amateur World Championship, a round-robin tournament, against the champions of 15 other nations. Also being staged at the same time and site was the 2nd Chess Olympiad for international teams. Despite being in a terrible train wreck which killed nine people and severely injured his wife, he finished with a solid score of 9.5/14 in his first strong international event outside the U.S.; this tied for 4th-6th places, and won a prize. The tournament champion was Max Euwe, who became World Chess Champion seven years later.

In 1929 at St. Louis (30th Western), Whitaker defeated the eventual champion, Chicago Master Herman Hahlbohm, but trailed him by half a point with 7.5/10, tied 2nd-4th. Whitaker tied for the title in 1930 at Chicago (31st Western) with Samuel Factor with 6.5/8.

In 1930, Whitaker represented Washington, D.C. against London in a transatlantic radio match, losing a spectacular tactical game to former British champion Sir George Thomas, 7th Baronet. This game was later selected for the classic, highly regarded 1952 best games book: 500 Master Games of Chess, by Savielly Tartakower and Julius du Mont.

=== Selection dispute ===
Whitaker became embroiled in a dispute with chess administrators during the early 1930s. He believed he should have been selected into the American team for the 3rd Chess Olympiad, Hamburg 1930 (instead of Harold Meyer Phillips (0.5/2 at Hamburg) or James Allan Anderson (6/17)), or for the 4th Chess Olympiad, Prague 1931. Based on prior competitive results, and on the weak showings by Phillips and Anderson on an otherwise well-performing American team (6th place) at Hamburg, Whitaker may have had a reasonable case. But it is likely that his criminal past (see below) was also a factor in the decision. He went so far as to directly contact FIDE President Alexander Rueb, suggesting that two American affiliate chess organizations be permitted as members of FIDE, allowing two American teams, while other nations had only one, but his argument was dismissed. This approach by an individual to the FIDE President over a national team selection matter was unlikely to win any friends for Whitaker. While seemingly frivolous, questions over which players were best qualified to play on the team did lead American chess administrators to stage a qualifying tournament among Masters, to select the national team for the 1933 Olympiad. By that time, Whitaker was facing serious criminal charges (see below); he was never selected to future teams. American teams without Whitaker were able to claim the Olympiad team gold medals for 1931, 1933, 1935 and 1937, along with many individual medals. By 1939, the Western Chess Association and the National Chess Federation had merged into the United States Chess Federation.

== Professional career ==
Whitaker was practicing law in Washington, D.C. by 1916. He worked for several years as a civil servant for the United States Patent and Trademark Office, as a patent attorney. He avoided military service during World War I by travelling around the country, staying ahead of recruiting notices, before finally reporting as the war wound down in November 1918, then being discharged after one day, for defective vision.

== Criminal involvement, conviction, prison ==
However, Whitaker was disbarred in 1924 from the practice of law.

Whitaker conspired with several of his own family members in an elaborate auto theft / insurance fraud scheme in the early 1920s. Whitaker, together with brother Roland and sisters Dorothy and Hazel Whitaker, was arrested in November 1921 for violating the Dyer Act, which had been passed with the aim of preventing the transportation of stolen automobiles across state lines. It was "a nationwide plot to recover insurance on automobiles claimed to have been stolen and transported from one state to another." After exhausting more than three years of delays and appeals in 1925, Whitaker served two years in United States Penitentiary, Leavenworth.

== Lindbergh case, return to prison, criminal schemes ==
Norman T. Whitaker, mug shot, 1932

In March and April 1932, Whitaker gained what eventually became national notoriety during the Lindbergh kidnapping, which saw famed aviator Charles Lindbergh's infant child kidnapped from his New Jersey estate. Whitaker, out on bail after a Florida arrest for a scheme similar to his earlier auto fraud conviction, fled that jurisdiction and headed north, to conspire with former United States Department of Justice Agent Gaston Means, who had been a bagman for bribes during the corrupt Harding administration. The two concocted a scheme to swindle a wealthy but gullible heiress, Evalyn Walsh McLean, co-publisher of The Washington Post, by claiming to be in contact with the kidnappers, and convinced her that they could arrange for the baby's safe return. Means intended to use Whitaker, who posed as a gangster, as the bagman to pick up her ransom money, but both were arrested and eventually convicted. What Whitaker was really convicted of was "attempted" extortion.

Means, without Whitaker's help, had earlier swindled Mrs. McLean out of $104,000, before enlisting Whitaker for a second con with a similar theme. Whitaker claimed that the Lindbergh kidnappers had refused $49,500 of the ransom money paid by Mrs. McLean because the serial numbers on the money had been published. Therefore, he demanded replacement money from her, in the amount of $35,000, in exchange for which he promised to return the original $49,500, plus the baby. She did not pay the second amount; that was when the Federal Bureau of Investigation was finally called in. The baby was found dead by father Charles Lindbergh in May 1932, two months after it had been kidnapped. Whitaker claimed in his 1933 trial in the capital, which became a national media frenzy, that he never got any of the money and, when asked what happened to the money, Whitaker replied, "I do not know and I wish I did."

Means was sentenced to 15 years in prison for the initial successful swindle and attempted reprise, and died in prison. Whitaker was released after serving just 18 months, but was soon arrested again. During his life, he served time at several prisons, including Alcatraz Federal Penitentiary, where he befriended the notorious Al Capone. They had a falling-out in 1936 when Capone refused to join in Whitaker's prison strike, but reconciled later on.

Whitaker was skillful at resetting car odometers with a screwdriver. He supplemented his income with this and other confidence tricks.

He practiced several confidence schemes, including impersonation and staged arrests. Contemporary accounts described him as well educated and multilingual, and noted that his clothing, access to cash, and confident manner helped him gain the trust of victims.

During his life, Whitaker was convicted of several additional serious offenses, including sending morphine through the mail, and sexual molestation of a minor (1950).

== Returns to chess ==
After his parole, and between his various prison terms, Whitaker became once again a tournament chess player, and for several years was one of the most active competitive players in America and Europe. Games databases which compile competitive events indicate a 16-year gap for Whitaker from 1931 to 1947; he played the 1947 U.S. Open, at Corpus Christi, Texas in his return. However, he qualified through a strong preliminary event into the 1948 U.S. Championship, his first. In the finals, Whitaker could only manage to finish 16th out of 20, in South Fallsburg, New York; he was in his late fifties by this time. The winner was Herman Steiner, and most of the competitors were far younger than Whitaker.

Whitaker played four more U.S. Opens, with very respectable results; by this era, the event was run under the Swiss-system tournament format, with much larger fields. At Baltimore 1948, he scored 6/12 for a tied 34th-41st; the winner was Weaver W. Adams. At Fort Worth 1951, he scored 8/12 for a tied 9-13th; Larry Evans won. At Milwaukee 1953, he scored 7.5/12 for a tied 43-55th; the champion was Donald Byrne. And finally at New Orleans 1954, he scored 7.5/12 for a tied 17-23rd; Evans and Arturo Pomar Salamanca shared the title.

Whitaker also served as a chess organizer and tournament director during this period, to supplement his income; for example, he organized and directed the 1959 Eastern States Open tournament in Washington, DC. He also travelled in 1956 with the New Jersey–based Log Cabin Chess Club to Cuba, playing first board for the team, ahead of 13-year-old Bobby Fischer, who was on second board.

Whitaker drew a match against the elderly German Grandmaster Friedrich Samisch in 1960.

=== Recognized as International Master ===
Physics Professor at Marquette University, Dr. Arpad Elo (himself a strong Master chess player), who designed first the American and then the worldwide rating systems for competitive chess, gave Whitaker a rating of 2420 in his authoritative 1978 work The Rating of Chess Players, Past and Present. This represents a very strong Master level. Chessmetrics gives him a peak rating of 2568 in 1928, and shows him as No. 25 in the world in 1918. The Chessmetrics group retrospectively determines Master-level historical chess performances on a worldwide basis. The United States was among the first nations to implement a formalized national rating system, based on mathematical statistics methods, for chess performances, but this did not take place until the 1940s. International chess ratings were introduced by FIDE in 1970, while formalized international titles for chess performances were introduced by FIDE in 1950.

After more than ten years of campaigning, Whitaker was finally awarded the International Master title by FIDE in 1965, based on his several strong tournament results from decades earlier. Certainly, his competitive results from Atlantic City 1921 and Kalamazoo 1927, against strong fields, were at the IM level. It was far from unusual for FIDE to take many years to resolve similar situations for historical chess champions from around the world.

In his later years, he was usually listed by the USCF as a Master Emeritus, but in January 1972 (when he was age 81), Chess Life magazine listed his rating as 2142. A threshold rating of 2200 indicates National Master playing standard in the United States.

== Later life and death ==
The last years of his life were spent driving around the country in his Volkswagen Beetle, playing in weaker-field chess tournaments in the Southern United States that he could potentially win.

In 1961, he was involved in a serious automobile accident in Arkansas in which his friend and co-author Glenn Hartleb was killed, but Whitaker still continued to compete actively in chess until shortly before his death in 1975 at the age of 85, in Phenix City, Alabama.

== Playing style ==
Grandmaster Arnold Denker, with co-author Larry Parr, characterized Whitaker as a very strong tactical player, and he won many games this way against even the strongest players living in the U.S., from 1910 right up until the early 1950s. Whitaker named the 'Whitaker Gambit' in the French Defense for the sequence 1.e4 e6 2.d4 d5 3.Be3, with a gambit of White's e-pawn for open lines; he played this successfully. Whitaker essayed a classical style, with a strong preference for symmetrical defenses with the Black pieces; he never seriously adopted the hypermodern style, developed from 1920 by leading players from his generation such as Aron Nimzowitsch, Alexander Alekhine, Richard Réti, Ernst Grünfeld, Savielly Tartakower, and Efim Bogoljubow. He was strong in the endgame.

== Notable chess games ==
- Norman Whitaker vs Jackson Showalter, Western Open, Excelsior 1915, Ruy Lopez, Steinitz Defense Deferred, C79, 1-0 A flashy tactical brilliancy against the former U.S. champion.
- Norman Whitaker vs Frank Marshall, 8th American Chess Congress, Atlantic City 1921, Ruy Lopez, Exchange, C68, 1-0 After an early exchange of Queens, Whitaker positionally outplays the U.S. champion, converting his advantage with fine endgame technique.
- Dawid Janowski vs Norman Whitaker, 8th American Chess Congress, Atlantic City 1921, Colle System, Harwitz Defence, A40, 0-1 The former World Championship finalist gets his favorite bishop pair, but Whitaker's precise defense proves too much.
- Samuel Reshevsky vs Norman Whitaker, National Chess Federation Congress, Kalamazoo 1927, Queen's Gambit Declined, Cambridge Springs Defense, D52, 0-1 The teenaged Reshevsky is gradually outplayed by the far more experienced Whitaker.
- Isaac Kashdan vs Norman Whitaker, U.S. Open, Fort Worth 1951, Queen's Gambit Declined, Orthodox Defense, D60, 0-1 Kashdan commits a couple of subtle middlegame errors which are exploited in dashing style by Whitaker.

== Writings ==
- 365 Ausgewählte Endspiele: Eines Für Jeden Tag Im Jahr (Deutsch) 365 Selected Endings: One For Each Day of the Year (English) by Norman T. Whitaker and Glenn E. Hartleb, 1960, ISBN 0-923891-84-6.
- Sixty-five Years in American Chess, by Norman T. Whitaker, December 1969, Chess Life, pp. 502–504.
