= Benjamin Raphael =

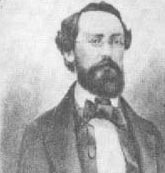
- Benjamin Raphael, chess master and physician, c. 1857

Personal information
- Born: Benjamin I. Raphael; November 8, 1818 Richmond, Virginia
- Died: March 17, 1880 (aged 61) New York City, New York

Chess career
- Country: United States
- Peak rating: Not calculated

Dr. Benjamin I. Raphael (November 8, 1818 – March 17, 1880) was born in Richmond, Virginia. He graduated from the University of Virginia with a medical degree. His father taught him the game of chess. He would later visit New York and went to the New York Chess Club, held in Carlton House, and it was here that he was able to strengthen his game by playing more formidable opponents such as Col. Charles D. Mead, Charles Stanley, and James Thompson, who at first gave him the odds of a knight.

== Career ==
After three years' attendance at New York Hospital, having completed his medical studies there, he traveled to Europe where he practiced medicine at the La Charite hospital in Paris. While in Paris he frequented the Café de la Régence where he often had games with Pierre Saint-Amant and Lionel Kieseritzky.

After returning to the United States he established himself in Louisville, Kentucky, where he was a medical practitioner and lecturer at the University of Louisville.

== Chess organizer ==
In 1845 he took part in forming a chess club, which soon thereafter, together with the clubs of Lexington and Frankfort, had the merit of instituting the well-known tournaments which took place every year in Kentucky. He played two games by correspondence, alongside a Mr. Ballard, with the Lexington club, as well as several matches via electric telegraph with Frankfort, Cincinnati, Nashville, and other towns. In the spring of 1857 he moved to New York, where he enjoyed an extensive medical practice. That same year he played a casual game against the legendary Paul Morphy, albeit a losing effort.

== Death and legacy ==
Dr. Raphael died in 1880. He was one of the participants in the 1st American Chess Congress played in 1857. He made it into the semi-finals, losing to Louis Paulsen. In a match for third place he then lost to Theodor Lichtenhein, eventually finishing in the fourth position in the tournament.

== See also ==
The games of Raphael as listed on ChessGames.com.
