= Dion Martinez =

Cuban-born American chess player

Dión M. Martínez (26 June 1837 – 11 March 1928) was a Cuban–born American chess master.

He was regarded as one of the strongest chess players in Philadelphia. There he played several matches against James Mason (4 : 5 in 1874 and 3 : 1 in 1875), Wilhelm Steinitz (0 : 7 in November 1882, 2.5 : 4.5 in December 1882, and 1 : 10 in 1883), and Johannes Zukertort (3.5 : 9.5 in 1884).

He took 9th at Philadelphia 1876 (Fourth American Chess Congress, Mason won), and tied for 17-18th at New York 1889 (Sixth American CC, Max Weiss and Mikhail Chigorin won). The New York Times of 16 June 1889 describes him as "Dion Martinez of Philadelphia is rather an elderly gentleman, tall and dignified. He was regarded as one of the strongest chessplayers in Philadelphia, but has not practiced much for two years past, and financial adversities have tended to detract his mind from the game.".
