= Louis Uedemann =

American chess player

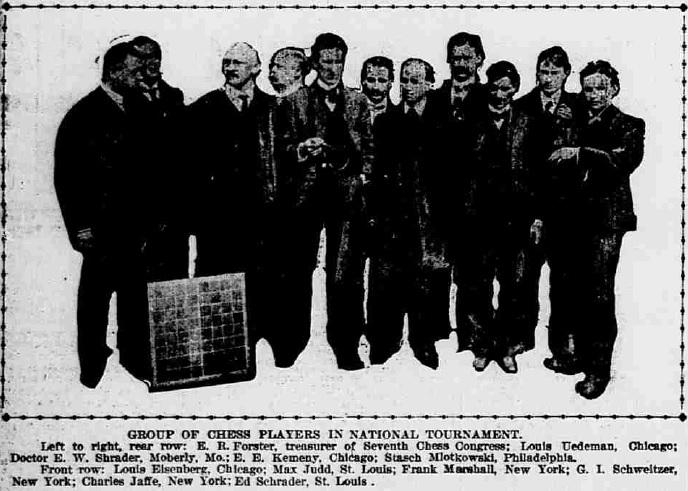
Uedemann as part of a group photo at the St. Louis tournament, 1904

Louis Uedemann (10 January 1854 – 22 November 1912) was an American chess master.

He twice won the U.S. Open Chess Championship at Excelsior 1900 (the first Western Chess Association Championship) and Excelsior 1902 (the 3rd WCA-ch).

He developed a code that was later refined by Mr. D. A. Gringmuth, of St. Petersburg, "a leading Russian problem composer," [Steinitz] and adapted for use with telegraphs for cable matches. Gringmuth's notation was first used in the telegraphic match between London and St Petersburg in November 1886 (see Chess notation § Uedemann code).

He also won at Chicago 1890, took 7th at St. Louis 1890 (Jackson Showalter won), tied for 4-5th at Lexington 1891 (Showalter and William Pollock won), took 3rd at Chicago 1903 (the 4th WCA-ch, Max Judd won), took 2nd, behind Stasch Mlotkowski, at St. Louis 1904 (the 5th WCA-ch), took 3rd at St. Louis 1904 (the 7th American Chess Congress, Frank Marshall won), tied for 3rd-5th at Excelsior 1905 (the 6th WCA-ch, Schrader won), took 5th at Chicago 1906 (the 7th WCA-ch, Wolbrecht won), took 3rd at Excelsior 1907 (the 8th WCA-ch, Michelsen won), took 4th at Excelsior 1908 (the 9th WCA-ch, Elliot won), took 3rd at Excelsior 1909 (the 10th WCA-ch, Oscar Chajes won), and took 3rd at Chicago 1910 (the 11th WCA-ch, Wolbrecht won).

He played for the Chicago Chess Club in cable matches against Twin Cities CC (1904), Franklin CC of Pennsylvania (1904 and 1905), Brooklyn CC (1905), and Manhattan CC (1905).
