= Charles Moehle =

American chess player

Charles Moehle (Möhle) (26 November 1859, New York – 1898) was an American chess master.

He took 3rd at New York 1880 (the 5th American Chess Congress won by George Henry Mackenzie), and shared 2nd, behind Jackson Whipps Showalter, at Cincinnati 1888 (the 1st American Chess Association Tournament). He participated in several matches; beat David Graham Baird (6.5–4.5) in 1879, and N. Gedalia (5–1) in 1879, drew with M. de la Puente (1–1) in 1883 (Philadelphia vs. Manhattan Chess Club), and lost to William H.K. Pollock (6.5–7.5) in 1890.

He was one of the operators of the Ajeeb, a chess-playing "automaton".
