= James Allan Anderson =

James Allan Anderson may refer to:

- James Allan Anderson (chess player) (1906–1991), American chess player
- Jim Anderson (swimmer) (born 1963), Scottish swimmer
