= Stasch Mlotkowski =

American chess player (1881–1943)

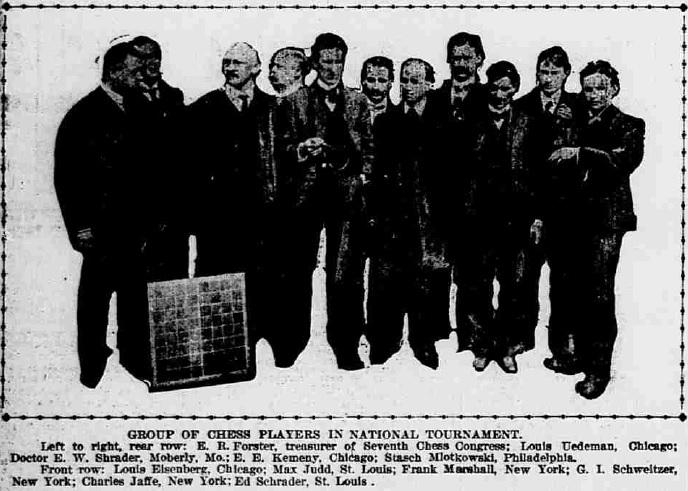
Mlotkowski as part of a group photo at the St. Louis tournament, 1904

Stasch Mlotkowski (Staś Młotkowski) (10 March 1881, Clifton Heights, New Jersey – 16 August 1943, Gloucester City, New Jersey) was an American chess master.

He was born into a Polish family in America. His father was Stanislaw Mlotkowski. His first name, Stasch (Polish Staś), is the diminutive form of the name Stanisław (Stanislau).

He was married to Danish model and actress Gwili Andre in 1929; they divorced in 1935.

== Cable matches ==
At the beginning of his career, he tied for 9-10th at Philadelphia 1900/01. He played several cable matches for Franklin Chess Club of Pennsylvania against Chicago CC in 1904 and Manhattan CC (1904, 1905, 1906, 1907, 1908, 1909, 1910, 1911, and 1912), as well as in a cable match USA vs. England in 1909.

== Chess competitions ==
He won at St. Louis 1904 (U.S. Open Chess Championship) and took 9th at St. Louis 1904 (the 7th American Chess Congress, Frank James Marshall won), tied for 9-10th at Philadelphia 1904 (Morgan won), took 2nd, behind C.S. Martinez, at Philadelphia 1911, participated in the American Chess Bulletin tournament in 1914/15, tied for 3rd-4th at Atlantic City 1920 (Marshall won), took 10th at Atlantic City 1921 (the 8th American Chess Congress, Dawid Janowski won), shared 1st with Norman Whitaker at San Francisco 1923 (US Open), took 8th at Detroit 1924 (US Open, Carlos Torre Repetto won), tied for 3rd-5th at Kalamazoo 1927 (Whitaker won), and took 6th at Bradley Beach 1928 (Abraham Kupchik won).
