= Napoleon Marache =

American chess player (1818–1875)

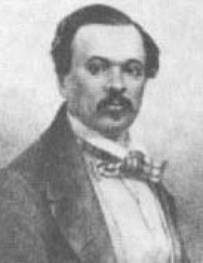

Personal information
- Born: Napoleon Marache; June 15, 1818 Meaux, France
- Died: May 11, 1875 (aged 56) New York, New York

Chess career
- Country: France United States
- Title: Master

Napoleon Marache (June 15, 1818 – May 11, 1875) was a chess player, problem composer, and journalist. He was born in France and moved to the United States at around 12 years of age. He learned the game of chess around 1844, and immediately became a devotee. He began composing chess problems and writing about chess the following year. In the mid-19th century, he was both one of America's first chess journalists and one of its leading players. In 1866, he published Marache's Manual of Chess, which was one of the country's first books on chess, and also one of its first books on backgammon. He is perhaps best known today for having lost a famous game to Paul Morphy.

== Early life; writing ==
Marache's Manual of Chess (1866)

Marache was born in Meaux, France in June 1818, three years to the month after his namesake Napoleon Bonaparte's final defeat at Waterloo. Marache moved to the United States at around 12 years of age. He learned the game around 1844 and immediately became a serious student of the game. He learned so quickly that he was able, three weeks after his first lesson, to give his tutor rook odds.

In 1845, Marache began composing chess problems. In 1846, he became the "first chess editor in America", publishing the periodical The Chess Palladium and Mathematical Sphinx. At approximately the same time, Charles Stanley started another American chess periodical, The American Chess Magazine. The two publications feuded shamelessly, with Stanley calling Marache's publication "a most ridiculous jumble of unintelligible nonsense" and "sixteen pages of soiled waste-paper". Only three issues of The Chess Palladium and Mathematical Sphinx were published, dated October, November, and December 1846. The American Chess Magazine ceased publication in 1847. At various times in the 1850s and 1860s, Marache was the chess editor or chess columnist for the New York Clipper, Porter's Spirit of the Times, and Wilkes' Spirit of the Times.

In 1865, Marache wrote the chess section for a new edition of Hoyle's guide to games. Shortly after the end of the Civil War, Morphy traveled to New York to work on an annotated collection of his games, with Marache acting as secretary and Charles A. Gilberg working closely with Morphy. Unfortunately, the book was never published, since prospective publishers "asked that he enrich the collection ... with new games", which Morphy refused to do.

In 1866, Marache published Marache's Manual of Chess, one of the first chess books in the United States. At the end of the book, Marache also gave the rules and discussed strategy for backgammon, Russian backgammon, and dominoes. The book was also one of the earliest books on backgammon in the United States. It was still in print in 1928, the publisher's name having since been changed to "Fitzgerald Publishing Corporation", New York.

== Play ==
In 1855–56, in a competition among eight of the leading players of the day, Marache won the championship cup of the New York Chess Club. Later that same winter, he finished first in a sixteen-player tournament. On August 30, 1856, Frank Leslie's Illustrated Newspaper published a challenge issued by Ernest Morphy to "Mr. Stanley or Marache (and we presume any player in the country)" to play a match against his nephew, Paul Morphy. No one accepted the challenge.

In 1857, Marache was one of the sixteen leading American players who participated in the First American Chess Congress, Morphy's triumphant first (and only) tournament. Marache defeated Daniel Fiske in the first round, losing his first two games but winning the remaining three. In the second round, he lost to Benjamin Raphael, winning two games, drawing two, and losing three.

Marache and Morphy did not meet in the tournament, but played five games in 1857 in which Morphy gave odds of pawn and move, with Morphy winning three and drawing two. In 1859 Morphy, who could successfully give odds of a knight to almost any player in the country, beat Marache in a game at those odds, after Marache blundered away his extra piece to what is today a well-known trap in the Max Lange Attack.

In 1858, Marache was one of the players who represented the New York Chess Club in the second game of a two-game telegraph match with its Philadelphia counterpart, which resulted in a win for New York. Marache substituted for Fiske, who had been one of the New York players in the first game, which had ended in a draw.

== Game against Morphy ==
Marache is perhaps best known today for losing the following brilliancy against Morphy in 1857, in which Marache played White in an Evans Gambit:

Position: d8 black rook, g8 black king, a7 black pawn, b7 black pawn, c7 black pawn, f7 black pawn, g7 black pawn, h7 black pawn, g6 black queen, a5 black bishop, f5 black knight, d4 black knight, f4 white bishop, c3 black pawn, a2 white pawn, c2 white queen, f2 white pawn, g2 white pawn, h2 white pawn, a1 white rook, b1 white knight, f1 white rook, g1 white king

Marache-Morphy, position after 18...Ncd4

Position: d8 black rook, g8 black king, a7 black pawn, b7 black pawn, c7 black pawn, f7 black pawn, g7 black pawn, h7 black pawn, g6 black queen, a5 black bishop, d4 black knight, e4 white queen, f4 white bishop, c3 black pawn, g3 black knight, a2 white pawn, f2 white pawn, g2 white pawn, h2 white pawn, a1 white rook, b1 white knight, f1 white rook, g1 white king

Marache-Morphy, position after 19...Ng3!!

Marache-Morphy, New York 1857 1.e4 e5 2.Nf3 Nc6 3.Bc4 Bc5 4.b4 Bxb4 5.c3 Ba5 6.d4 exd4 7.e5? d5! 8.exd6 Qxd6 9.O-O Nge7 10.Ng5? Better was 10.Ba3, although White's attacking prospects would not be enough to compensate for the sacrificed pawn. O-O 11.Bd3 Bf5! Sacrificing an exchange, for which Black gets three pawns and a strong attack. 12.Bxf5 Nxf5 13.Ba3 Qg6 14.Bxf8 Qxg5 15.Ba3 dxc3 16.Bc1 Qg6 17.Bf4 Rd8 18.Qc2 Ncd4 (position at left) 19.Qe4 The alternatives were no better: 19.Qd3 Ng3!! wins the queen for two knights after 20.Qxg3 Ne2+; 19.Rd1 Ne3! 20.Qxg6 Ne2+ 21.Kh1 Rxd1#; 19.Qa4 b5! 20.Qxa5 Ne2+ 21.Kh1 Nxf4 22.Rg1 (or 22.g3 Qc6+ 23.f3 Qxf3+!!) Rd1! 23.g3 Qc6+ and mate next. Ng3!! (position at right) 20.Qxg6 White has no reasonable alternative, e.g. 20.Bxg3 Qxe4 or 20.Qe7 Nde2+ wins the queen. Nde2# 0-1

== Problem ==
Position: d8 white rook, d6 black knight, f6 black pawn, g6 white bishop, a5 white knight, b5 white rook, d5 black bishop, g5 black pawn, b4 white pawn, d4 black king, f4 black knight, g4 white pawn, c3 black pawn, g3 white knight, c2 white king, d2 white pawn, f2 white pawn, h1 white queen

Marache, White to play and mate in two

Position: d8 white rook, f7 white bishop, d6 black knight, f6 black pawn, a5 white knight, b5 white rook, d5 black bishop, g5 black pawn, b4 white pawn, d4 black king, f4 black knight, g4 white pawn, c3 black pawn, g3 white knight, c2 white king, d2 white pawn, f2 white pawn, h1 white queen

Marache, position after 1.Bf7!

At left is a chess problem composed by Marache, which he called, "One of the most difficult two-move compositions extant." Edward Winter calls it, "An interesting problem with a Zugzwang theme." The key move is 1.Bf7! (see diagram at right).
