= Eugene Rousseau =

Eugene Rousseau may refer to:

- Eugene Rousseau (saxophonist) (1932–2024), American saxophonist
- Eugène Rousseau (chess player) (1805–1877), French chess player
- Eugène Rousseau (artist) (1827–1890), French designer of glassware
