= Preston Ware =

American chess player

Preston Ware Jr. (August 12, 1821 – January 29, 1890) was an American chess player. He is best known today for playing unorthodox chess openings.

Ware was born in Wrentham, Massachusetts, and died in Boston, Massachusetts.

== Boston Mandarins ==
Ware was an influential member of the "Mandarins of the Yellow Button" in Boston. The "Yellow Button" was a pin worn in the hats of Chinese imperial officials to indicate high rank in the civil service. The Boston Mandarins were a group of chess players in the late 19th century, including John Finan Barry, L. Dore, C. F. Burille, F. H. Harlow, Dr. Edward Mowry Harris, C. F. Howard, Major Otho Ernst Michaelis, General William Cushing Paine, Dr. H. Richardson, C. W. Snow, Henry Nathan Stone, Franklin Knowles Young, and Preston Ware. The group was the foundation of what would become the modern Deschapelles Chess Club in Boston.

== Chess career ==
Ware vs. Steinitz, 1882

Position: g8 black king, c7 black queen, g7 black pawn, d6 black knight, f6 black pawn, g6 white pawn, a5 black pawn, d5 black bishop, f5 white pawn, c4 black pawn, d4 white pawn, e4 black pawn, f4 white queen, a3 black bishop, c3 white pawn, e3 white knight, g3 white bishop, a2 white pawn, b2 black rook, c2 white bishop, f1 white rook, g1 white king

Position after 37.Ne3

Ware was an avid tournament player and played in the Second International Chess Tournament, Vienna 1882, the finest chess tournament of its time. He finished in sixteenth place of eighteen scoring a total of 11 points out of 34, but he did beat Max Weiss and the winner of the tournament, Wilhelm Steinitz, in a game lasting 113 moves. At the time, Steinitz had not lost or drawn a game for nine years prior to this tournament and was the unofficial World Champion. Ware also competed in the first, second, fourth, and fifth American Chess Congresses.

At the Fifth American Chess Congress in 1880, Ware accused James Grundy of reneging on a deal to draw the game, with Grundy instead trying to play for a win. A newspaper article contemporary to the event stated, "Ware's avowal of his right to sell a game in a tourney was a novelty in chess ethics ... Ware's veracity has not been questioned, only his obliquity of moral vision ..."

== Legacy ==
Ware's other claim to fame was his eccentric opening play. He used the Ware Opening (then known as the Meadow Hay Opening), the Corn Stalk Defense (sometimes known as the Ware Defense), and the Stonewall Attack. Around 1888, he reintroduced the Stone-Ware Defense to the Evans Gambit, 1.e4 e5 2.Nf3 Nc6 3.Bc4 Bc5 4.b4 Bxb4 5.c3 Bd6!?, named after Ware and Henry Nathan Stone (1823–1909). (It had originally been played by Alexander McDonnell against Louis-Charles Mahé de La Bourdonnais in 1834.)
