= Henry Hosmer =

American chess player (1837–1892)

Personal information
- Born: April 7, 1837 Concord, Massachusetts
- Died: January 1, 1892 (aged 54) Chicago, Illinois

Chess career
- Country: United States
- Title: Master

Henry Hosmer (April 7, 1837 – January 1, 1892) was a nineteenth-century American chess master. He is known to have played in only two significant chess tournaments: the Second and Third American Chess Congresses in 1871 and 1874.

== Chess career ==
The first modern chess tournament was not held until London 1851, and few tournaments were held in the 1870s, Hosmer's heyday. He is known to have played in only two, the Second and Third American Chess Congresses. In the Second American Chess Congress, held in Cleveland in November 1871, Hosmer finished second, scoring 12 out of 16 possible points in a double round robin format, behind George Henry Mackenzie, who scored 14 points. In the Third American Chess Congress, held in Chicago in July 1874, Hosmer again finished second to Mackenzie, this time by only half a point: Mackenzie scored 8.5 of 10 possible points, while Hosmer scored 8 points. In both of the two tournaments, Mackenzie and Hosmer split their games, with each winning one of the two games; they also played a draw, which under the tournament rules did not count in the results, at the first tournament.

Edo Historical Chess Ratings estimates that Hosmer's rating following the Third American Chess Congress would have been 2504.
