= Vladimir Sournin =

Russian-American chess player

Vladimir Sournin (Russian: Владимир Сурнин; 1 August 1875, – 21 August 1942) was a Belarusian-American chess master.

== Chess career ==
Sournin was born in Mstsislaw, Russian Empire, in 1875; the city is today part of Belarus.

In 1896, he lost a match to Frank James Marshall (+2 –7 =2) in New York. He played at Ostend 1906 (elim.), took 19th at St Petersburg 1911 (Stepan Levitsky won), and tied for 14–15th at Vilna 1912 (B tournament, Karel Hromádka won).

After World War I, he tied for 5-7th at Atlantic City 1921 (the Eighth American Chess Congress, Dawid Janowski won), took 9th at Lake Hopatcong 1923 (the Ninth ACC, Marshall and Abraham Kupchik won), and took 7th at St Louis 1929 (Hahlbohm won). Sournin died in Baltimore in 1942.
