= James Grundy (chess player) =

English-American chess player

James Glover Grundy
Personal information
- Born: James Glover Grundy; February 14, 1855 Manchester?, England
- Died: January 26, 1919 (aged 63) Manchester?, England

Chess career
- Country: England; United States
- Title: Master

James Glover Grundy (February 14, 1855 – January 26, 1919) was an English-American chess master.

== Chess career ==
Grundy is known to have played in only one chess tournament of any note. However, his result in that tournament was outstanding. In the Fifth American Chess Congress, held in New York City in January 1880, Grundy tied for first with George Henry Mackenzie, with each scoring 13½/18 in the double round robin.

At that tournament, Preston Ware accused Grundy of reneging on a deal to draw the game, with Grundy instead trying to play for a win. A newspaper article contemporary to the event stated, "Ware's avowal of his right to sell a game in a tourney was a novelty in chess ethics ... Ware's veracity has not been questioned, only his obliquity of moral vision ..."

== Notable game ==
In the following game, Grundy beat George Henry Mackenzie, one of the strongest American players of his day:

Grundy-Mackenzie, Fifth American Chess Congress, New York 1880
1.e4 e5 2.Nf3 Nc6 3.Bb5 a6 4.Ba4 Nf6 5.d3 b5 6.Bb3 Bc5 7.O-O d6 8.c3 Bg4 9.Be3 O-O 10.Nbd2 Qd7 11.Re1 Rad8 12.Bc2 Bxe3 13.fxe3 Ne7 14.a4 c6 15.Qe2 Ra8 16.Qf2 Ng6 17.h3 Bxf3 18.Nxf3 h6 19.Red1 Qe7 20.Nd2 Nh7 21.Nf1 Nh4 22.Ng3 g6 23.d4 Rad8 24.axb5 axb5 25.Ra6 c5 26.Rda1 b4 27.Ra7 Rd7 28.Rxd7 Qxd7 29.Nf5 Nxf5 30.exf5 bxc3 31.bxc3 cxd4 32.exd4 exd4 33.fxg6 fxg6 34.Qxd4 Qe6 35.Ra6 Rf6 36.Be4 Kg7 37.Ra7+ Kh8 38.Ra8+ Kg7 39.Bd5 Qe1+ 40.Kh2 h5 41.Ra7+ Kh6 42.Rxh7+ Kxh7 43.Qxf6 h4 44.Qf7+ Kh6 45.Qf4+ Kh7 46.c4 1–0
