= James Thompson (chess player) =

American chess player

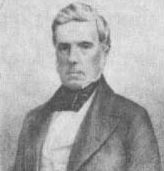
Chess master James Thompson, circa 1857

James Thompson (23 September 1804, London – 2 December 1870, New York) was an American chess master.

== Early life ==
Born in London, he arrived in New York, where formed the New York Chess Club in 1839.

== Chess career ==
He participated in the First American Chess Congress at New York 1857, and lost a match to Paul Morphy (0 : 3) in the first round. He also lost other matches to him; casual (0 : 5) in 1857, two formal (3.5 : 5.5) in May/June 1859 and (6 : 10) in October 1859, and casual (1 : 3) in 1860 (Morphy gave odds of a knight in three latter matches). He drew a match with Charles D. Mead (1.5 : 1.5) in 1857, and played several times in New York Chess Club tournaments, losing to Frederick Perrin in 1854, 1857, and 1859, and James A. Leonard in 1860/61.

== Death ==
Thompson died in 1870 in New York City.
