= Frederick Perrin =

American chess player

Frederick Perrin (5 December 1815 – 27 January 1889) was an American chess master.

Perrin was born in London, Great Britain and was descended from a Swiss family. He went to the United States in 1845. He played twice in the American Chess Congress at New York 1857 (Paul Morphy won) and Chicago 1874 (George Henry Mackenzie won). He participated several times in the New York Chess Club Tournament, winning in 1859.

Perrin had been a professor of languages at Princeton College. He had mastered French and German alongside English. In the 1850s he was president of the New York Chess Club. In later years he was an honorary member of the Brooklyn Chess Club where he defeated McKenzie in a game a few weeks before his death. He died of pneumonia at home at the corner of Pacific Street and Flatbush Avenue after three-weeks of illness. Reportedly his last words were "Doctor, I am puzzled over that last move of mine."
