= Louis Eisenberg =

Ukrainian-American chess player

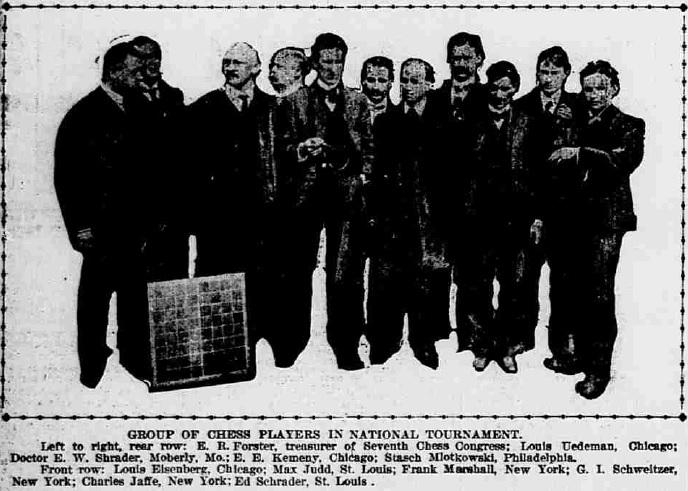
Eisenberg (left) at the Seventh Chess Congress, St. Louis, 1904

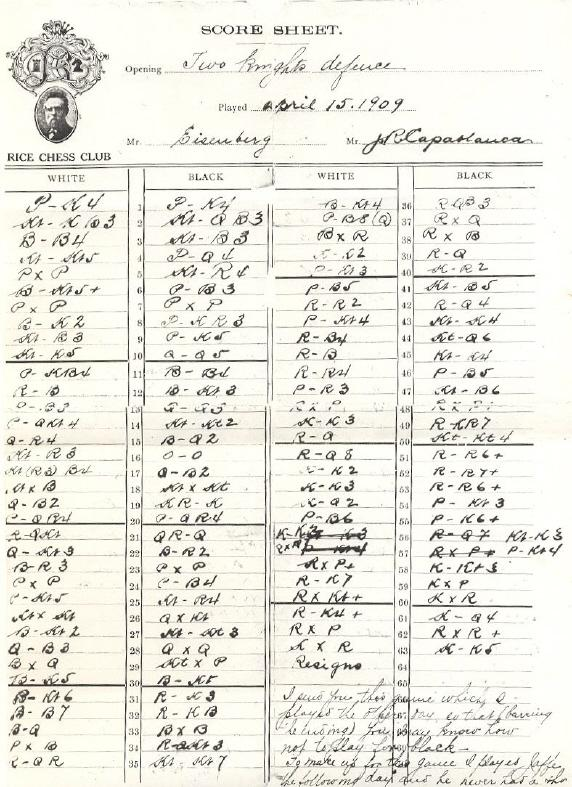
Eisenberg vs. Capablanca, 1909

Louis R. Eisenberg (Yiddish: לייב אייזנברג; Ukrainian: Луїс Айзенберг; 1876 – after 1920) was a Ukrainian-American chess master.

He was born in Odesa into a Ukrainian Jewish family in 1876. After graduating from Nicholas College, he pursued journalism until, in 1901–02, he won a chess tournament at Odesa 1901, and journeyed to Monte Carlo to participate in the international masters' tournament played there under the auspices of the Cercle des Etrangers in 1902. He gave quick coverage of this tournament in Odesskiya Novosti. Eisenberg took 18th place, although his victory on this occasion over Harry Nelson Pillsbury was his best effort. The event was won by Géza Maróczy.

Coming from within a few hours ride of Kishinev, after antisemitic Kishinev pogrom on 6–7 April 1903, he had decided to emigrate to the United States. The August 16, 1903 New York Tribune wrote that "Louis R. Eisenberg (...) who recently played for Chicago in the telegraphic match against the Brooklyn Chess Club has made Pittsburg his home." He also played in matches Chicago CC vs. Twin Cities CC in 1904, and Brooklyn CC vs. Rice CC New York in 1909.

Eisenberg shared 5th at St. Louis 1904 (the 7th American Chess Congress, Frank James Marshall won). He participated in the New York State Chess Association championship in 1909, finishing in a three-way tie for first with Clarence S. Howell and H. Zirn. The three had a playoff and Howell won. This and a game against José Raúl Capablanca which was played in New York City indicate that Eisenberg was probably living there in 1909. His last known tournament was at the U.S. Open Chess Championship of 1920.
