= American Chess Association =

The American Chess Association (ACA) was a chess organization founded in New York City in 1857. The organization organized the first major chess tournament, the First American Chess Congress, in the United States on October 6, 1857. On November 11, 1857, Paul Morphy, who had defeated Louis Paulsen in the tournament, was presented with a silver service at the prize giving by Colonel Charles D. Mead, President of the ACA. On behalf of Paul Morphy, the American Chess Association offered a $5,000 challenge to any player in Europe to contest a match with the recently crowned ACA champion.

The ACA published a monthly magazine, American Chess Monthly, founded in January 1857 by Willard Fiske, who had helped organize the First American Chess Congress. Fiske edited American Chess Monthly from 1857 until 1860, four months before it ceased publication. Morphy was credited as co-editor, though he had little actual involvement. Another magazine called Chess Monthly published in 1879-96 had no connection with this one.

The organization ceased to function within a few years, and should not be confused with others of the same name founded in 1871 and 1874 (which organized the Third American Chess Congress), or the later American Chess Federation (a successor to the Western Chess Association), which merged with the National Chess Federation in 1939 to form the current United States Chess Federation.
