= Theodor Lichtenhein =

American chess player (1829–1874)

Theodor (Theodore) Lichtenhein (January 1829 – 19 May 1874) was an American chess master.

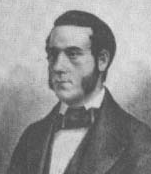
Lichtenhein, c. 1860

Born at Königsberg, in East Prussia, he learned chess at the age of 12, and six years afterwards, he was president of the Königsberg Chess Club. He studied at first for the medical profession, and afterwards entered the service of the Prussian Army.

He moved to the US in November 1851 aboard the ship Henry Clay, and at first devoted nearly all his time to his mercantile wholesale business. Then in 1856, he joined the New York Chess Club and soon became its strongest member. In the 1st American Chess Congress held in New York from 6 October – 10 November 1857, and won by Paul Morphy, he took third prize. He won against Charles Henry Stanley (3–2) in 1st round, beat Frederick Perrin (3–0) in 2nd round, lost to Morphy (½–3½) in semifinal, and beat Benjamin Raphael (3–0) in the 3rd place final.

Lichtenhein was elected the New York Chess Club's president in 1858. He drew with Perrin (1–1) in a match New York vs. Brooklyn in 1860, and won a match against Hardman Philips Montgomery (7½–2½) at Philadelphia 1861. He served as a Major in the 58th Regiment of New York Volunteers during the Civil War, acting also as a correspondent for Frank Leslie's Illustrated Newspaper. He died in Chicago.
