= George Henry Mackenzie =

Chess master (1837–1891)

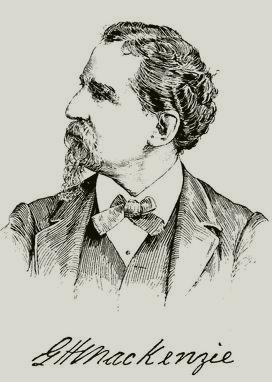

Personal information
- Born: 24 March 1837 North Kessock, Scotland, United Kingdom
- Died: 14 April 1891 (aged 54) New York City, United States

Chess career
- Country: United States

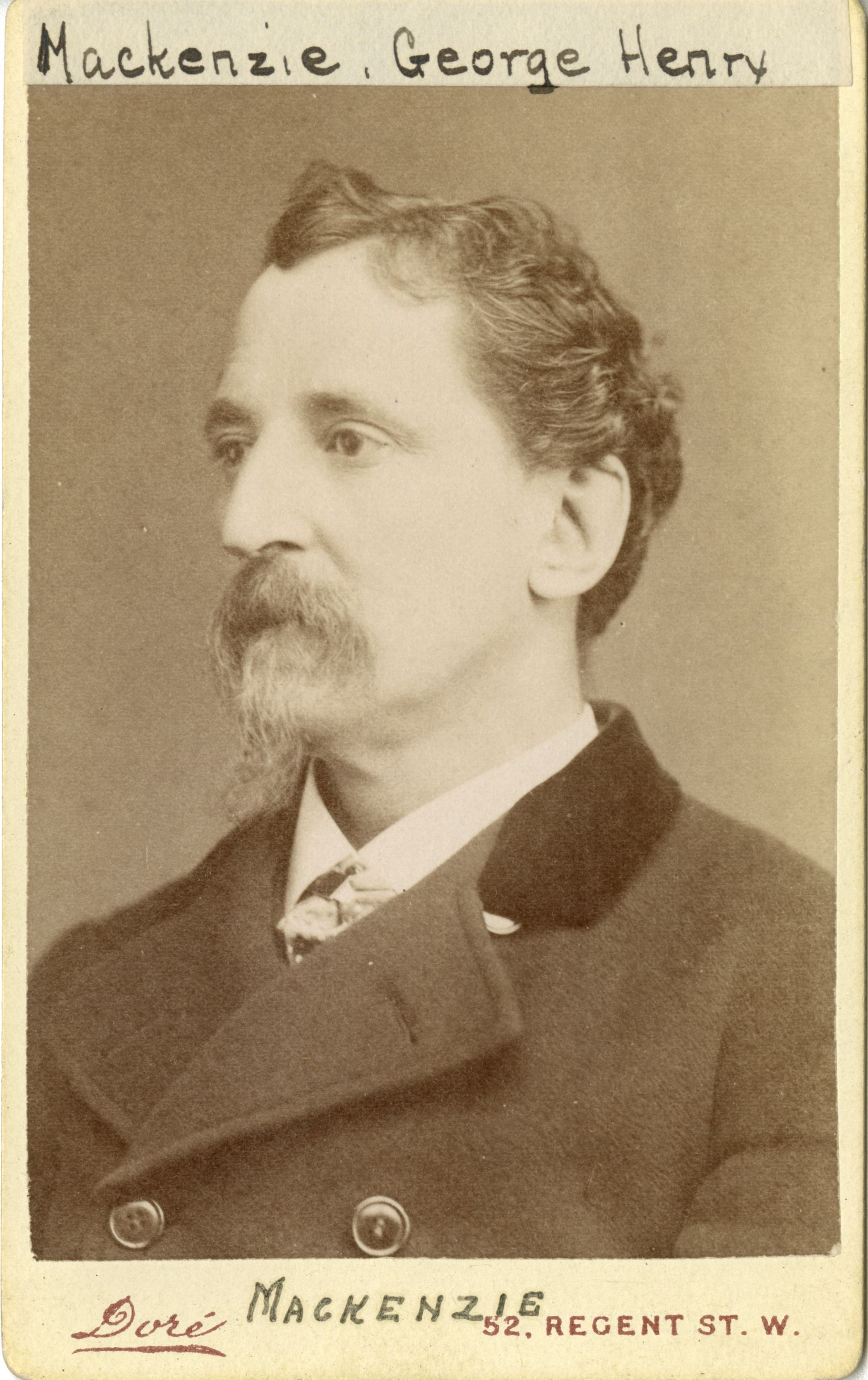
George Henry Mackenzie

George Henry Mackenzie (24 March 1837 – 14 April 1891) was a Scottish-born American chess master.

== Biography ==
Mackenzie was born in North Kessock, Scotland. He was educated mainly in Aberdeen, at the Aberdeen Grammar School and the Marischal College, University of Aberdeen; but he studied in Rouen, France, and Stettin, Prussia, from 1853 to 1855. He was commissioned into the 60th Foot as an ensign in 1856 when he was nineteen years old. Soon after, his regiment was sent to the Cape of Good Hope, and from there to India. He traveled to England in 1858, having been promoted to the rank of lieutenant. In 1861 he sold his commission and retired from the army. Mackenzie began to practice chess in 1853, and in 1862 he won a handicap tournament in London in which he defeated Adolf Anderssen.

In 1863, during the middle of the American Civil War, he moved to the United States. During the Civil War, he fought on the Union side, obtaining the rank of captain in the 10th United States Colored Troops Regiment. However, on 16 June 1864, he was reported as a deserter by the United States Army. In 1865, Mackenzie came to New York, where he wrote on chess matters for Turf, Field, and Farm. He won the first prizes at the annual contests of the New York Chess Club in 1865, 1866, 1867, and 1868.

== Death ==
Mackenzie died at the Cooper Union Hotel in New York City on 14 April 1891, but the cause of death is a matter of considerable speculation. The New York Times reported on 27 April 1890 that Mackenzie was suffering from tuberculosis, and on 15 April 1891, a day after his death, mentioned that the immediate cause of death was pneumonia, noting that his condition had worsened from a fever caught while visiting Havana. However, on 29 April 1891, The Sun carried a report by Dr. S. B. Minden, who had visited Mackenzie before his death, claiming that the captain had committed suicide by an overdose of morphine, which he had requested earlier to ease the pain from his tuberculosis, but Dr. Minden had refused. The doctor who had attended Mackenzie during his final illness dismissed this assertion as ridiculous, insisting that tuberculosis was the cause of death.

== Chess career ==
Mackenzie dominated American chess from the time he immigrated in 1863 until shortly before his death in 1891. During a 15-year period, from 1865 through 1880, Mackenzie amassed a record of thirteen straight first-place finishes in tournaments, while winning six of seven matches, with only one drawn. His successes in the U.S. included first place at Cleveland 1871, Chicago 1874, and New York 1880 (the second, third, and fifth American Chess Congresses, respectively). In 1878 Mackenzie began to receive invitations to play in the top international tournaments in Europe.

Subsequently, he played in many tournaments both at home and abroad. In 1878, he tied for fourth–fifth in Paris. In 1882, he tied for fourth in Vienna (Wilhelm Steinitz and Szymon Winawer won). In 1883, he tied for fifth–seventh in London (Johannes Zukertort won). In 1885, he took fourth place in Hereford (Joseph Henry Blackburne won), and took seventh in Hamburg 1885 (Isidor Gunsberg won). In 1886, he tied for seventh–eighth in London.

The best result of his career was winning the fifth German Championship at Frankfurt-on-the-Main 1887, ahead of all the leading players except for World Champion Wilhelm Steinitz: Blackburne, Zukertort, Berthold Englisch, Max Weiss, Curt von Bardeleben, Siegbert Tarrasch, and Louis Paulsen.

He won the fifth Scottish Championship at Glasgow 1888 with a score of +4−0=2. Samuel Lipschuetz replaced him as the United States Chess Champion in 1890.

While his only international victory was at Frankfurt 1887, Mackenzie was a frequent high placer throughout his career. In match play, in 1886 he defeated the other top American master of the era, Samuel Lipschutz, by a score of +5−3=5. The same year, Mackenzie drew a match in London with top European master Amos Burn with the final tally +4−4=2. Despite this, Mackenzie was not considered a serious contender for the world title held by Steinitz. His tournament results were below those of Steinitz, Zukertort and Blackburne in the 1880s, and his personal record against Steinitz was +1−6=3.

== Famous games ==
Position: g8 black rook, h8 black rook, a7 black pawn, b7 black pawn, c7 black queen, d7 black bishop, f7 black pawn, g7 black king, h7 black pawn, c6 black pawn, d6 black bishop, f6 black pawn, g6 black knight, d5 black pawn, h5 white queen, d4 white pawn, f4 white pawn, h4 white knight, d3 white bishop, f3 white rook, g3 white knight, a2 white pawn, b2 white pawn, c2 white pawn, g2 white pawn, h2 white pawn, f1 white rook, g1 white king

Position after 16...Rag8

Mackenzie–James Mason, Paris 1878
1.e4 e6 2.d4 d5 3.Nc3 Nf6 4.exd5 exd5 5.Nf3 Bd6 6.Bd3 0-0 7.0-0 Nc6 8.Bg5 Ne7 9.Bxf6 gxf6 10.Nh4 Kg7 11.Qh5 Rh8 12.f4 c6 13.Rf3 Ng6 14.Raf1 Qc7 15.Ne2 Bd7 16.Ng3 Rag8 (see diagram) 17.Qh6+!! Kxh6 18.Nhf5+ Bxf5 19.Nxf5+ Kh5 20.g4+ Kxg4 21.Rg3+ Kh5 22.Be2# 1–0

Preceded by Paul Morphy	United States Chess Champion; 1871–1889	Succeeded by S. Lipschütz
