= Stanisław Mlotkowski =

Stanisław Mlotkowski (April 19, 1829 – August 19, 1900) was a Polish military officer in the 1846 insurrection. The insurrection was unsuccessful, and Mlotkowski was forced into exile, escaping to Hungary, then Paris, and then to the United States. Mlotkowski lived in Philadelphia, working as a painter, until the Civil War broke out.

Mlotkowski enrolled in the Army as a lieutenant on September 11, 1861, and was subsequently promoted to captain of the Pennsylvania Light Artillery at Fort Delaware. He gained a reputation for his kindness towards Confederate prisoners-of-war who were consigned to the fort. Confederate prisoners called Mlotkowski a "Black Republican", meaning he was pro-abolitionist at heart, and shared ideological sympathies with the Union cause. Prisoners observed that "his fairness, his respect for the rights of others, and his determination to recognize the goodness of human beings was exemplary."

Following the war, Mlotkowski joined a group of the Grand Army of Republican veterans and helped develop the Atlantic coast resort at Egg Harbor City, New Jersey.

He was the father of American chess master Stasch Mlotkowski.
