= James Allan Anderson (chess player) =

American chess player

Personal information
- Born: 28 January 1906
- Died: 23 December 1991 (aged 85) Antioch, United States

Chess career
- Country: United States

James Allan Anderson (28 June 1906 – 23 December 1991) was an American chess player.

== Biography ==
James Allan Anderson was a three-time St. Louis Chess Champion who defeated Alexander Alekhine in a simultaneous exhibition in 1929. He finished second in the 1929 Western Chess Association Championship (ahead of Herman Steiner, Norman Whitaker and Samuel Factor).

James Allan Anderson played for United States in the Chess Olympiad:

- In 1930, at reserve board in the 3rd Chess Olympiad in Hamburg (+3, =7, -7).

Anderson finished fourth at the 1931 Western Chess Association Championship in Tulsa and won the St. Louis championship in 1932 with 8½ from 9, before disappearing from the chess world at the age of 26.

Anderson died in Antioch, California, and is buried at Oak View Memorial Park in that city.
