= Eugène Rousseau (chess player) =

French-American chess player (1805–1877)

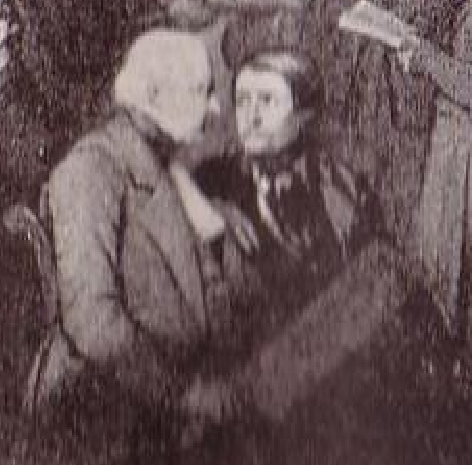
Detail of the lithography Le Match Staunton – Saint-Amant by Alexandre Laemlein. Rousseau is on the right.

Eugène Rousseau (14 November 1805 (23 Brumaire Year XIV in the French Republican calendar), Saint-Denis, Seine-Saint-Denis, France – 24 February 1877, Paris, France) was a French-American chess player. He was the strongest chess player in New Orleans in the first half of the 1840s. The Rousseau Gambit is named after him.

== Chess biography ==
In 1845, Rousseau played a match against the Englishman Charles Stanley for the title of chess champion of the United States, the first contest ever for that title. The match was played for a stake of $1,000. Rousseau lost the match (+8−15=8) and Stanley became the first US Champion.

Rousseau's second in the match was Ernest Morphy, who took his eight-year-old nephew, Paul Morphy, along and allowed him to be present for the contests. Later, Paul was allowed to play Rousseau, and it became clear that Paul was the better player, despite his young age.

In 1850, Johann Löwenthal paid a visit to New Orleans, and beat Rousseau five games straight.

== Notable game ==
Rousseau beat Szymon Winawer with the black pieces in Paris in 1867:

1.e4 e5 2.f4 Bc5 3.Nf3 d6 4.c3 Bg4 5.Bc4 Nd7 6.h3 Bxf3 7.Qxf3 Qe7 8.a4 a6 9.b4 Ba7 10.Na3 Ngf6 11.f5 c6 12.d3 h6 13.Nc2 Rd8 14.Be3 Bb8 15.0-0 Nh7 16.Qg4 Qf8 17.h4 Ndf6 18.Qf3 Qe7 19.g4 d5 20.Bc5 Bd6 21.Bxd6 Qxd6 22.Bb3 0-0 23.Rad1 g5 24.Ne3 Kg7 25.h5 Rfe8 26.Rf2 Nf8 27.Rb2 b5 28.Ra2 d4 29.axb5 axb5 30.Nc2 Ra8 31.Rxa8 Rxa8 32.cxd4 exd4 33.Kg2 N8d7 34.Qf2 Nxg4 35.Qxd4+ Qxd4 36.Nxd4 Ne3+ 37.Kf3 Nxd1 38.Bxd1 Ne5+ 39.Ke3 Ra1 40.Be2 Rb1 41.Nf3 Nxf3 42.Bxf3 Rxb4 43.e5 c5 44.Bc6 Rb1 45.Ke4 b4 46.Kd5 b3 47.Kd6 b2 48.Ke7 Re1 49.f6+ Kg8 50.Be4 Rxe4 51.dxe4 b1=Q 52.Kd6 Qxe4 0–1
