= Isidor Gunsberg =

Hungarian chess player (1854–1930)

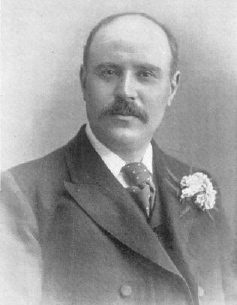

Personal information
- Born: Isidor Arthur Günzberg; Isidor Arthur Gunsberg; 1 November 1854 Pest, Kingdom of Hungary
- Died: 2 May 1930 (aged 75) London, United Kingdom of Great Britain and Northern Ireland.

Chess career
- Country: Austria-Hungary; United Kingdom of Great Britain and Ireland
- Peak ranking: 2

Isidor Arthur Gunsberg (also spelled Günzberg, Hungarian: Gunsberg Artúr Izidor; 1 November 1854 – 2 May 1930) was a Hungarian chess player, best known for narrowly losing the 1891 World Chess Championship match to Wilhelm Steinitz.

== Biography ==
Gunsberg began his career as the player operating the remote-controlled chess automaton Mephisto, but later became a chess professional. He moved to Great Britain in 1876, later becoming a naturalized British citizen on 12 May 1908.

In the late 1880s and early 1890s Gunsberg was one of the top players in the world. He decisively won a national tournament in London in July 1885, and a few weeks later won the 4th German Chess Congress in Hamburg. In match play, he defeated Joseph Blackburne and Henry Bird in 1886. In 1887, he shared first with Amos Burn in the London tournament. In 1890 he drew a match with Mikhail Chigorin, a former and future challenger for the world chess championship. Later that year, Gunsberg himself challenged Wilhelm Steinitz for the world title. The match took place in New York City and Gunsberg lost with four wins, six losses, and nine draws.

In 1916 he sued the Evening News for libel when they said that his chess column contained "blunders". He won the suit after the High Court accepted a submission that in chess matters, eight oversights did not make a "blunder".

== Chess strength ==
Arpad Elo calculates that Gunsberg's best 5-year average Elo rating was 2560. According to Chessmetrics, Gunsberg's best single performance was his 1887 match against Blackburne, where he scored 8 of 13 possible points (62%). Also, Gunsberg's performance in the world championship match against Steinitz indicated he was a part of the world elite in the late 1880s and early 1890s. However, in the year he qualified for the match against Steinitz, 1889, Gunsberg played in three different international tournaments: Amsterdam, the German Chess Congress, and the US Chess Congress. At Amsterdam, he finished in 5th place out of 9 competitors with an exact 50% score, 4/8, behind Burn, a young Emanuel Lasker, Mason, and Van Vliet. At the German Chess Congress, he finished tied for 4th–7th places out of 18 competitors, with a +3 score, 10/17, behind Tarrasch, Burn, and Mieses. Finally, at the US Chess Congress, his best result, and the reason he was allowed to challenge Steinitz, he finished in lone 3rd place out of 20 competitors, with a +19 score, 28½/38, behind Weiss and Chigorin.

Later on, Gunsberg's position among the foremost chess masters would slip. In the famous Hastings 1895 chess tournament, Gunsberg finished with a −3 score of 9/21, good for a share of 15th–16th place out of 22 competitors.

Gunsberg also competed in the famous St. Petersburg 1914 chess tournament. Well past his best, he finished in last place, with only two draws in his ten games.

== See also ==
- List of Jewish chess players
