= Samuel Lipschutz =

American chess player (1863–1905)

Samuel Lipschütz
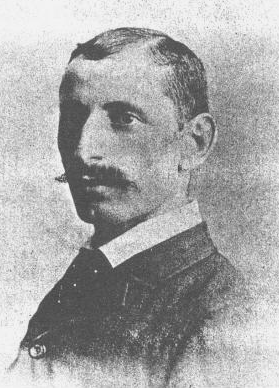
- Lipschütz in 1892

Personal information
- Full name: Samuel or Salomon Lipschütz
- Born: July 4, 1863 Ungvár, Ung County, Austria-Hungary
- Died: November 30, 1905 (aged 42) Hamburg, German Empire

Samuel or Salomon Lipschütz (Note: There is considerable dispute over Lipschütz's first name. Chess historian Edward Winter writes, "S. Lipschütz (1863–1905) was a US champion, but chess historians are still unable to establish with certainty his forename." The Chess-Player's Manual, to which Lipschütz contributed the appendix, gives only his first initial, "S". The Jewish Encyclopedia (see below), gives his first name as "Solomon". Jeremy Gaige in his 1987 book Chess Personalia: A Biobibliography lists five sources that give his first name as "Simon", four that give it as "Samuel", and one that gives it as "Solomon". In an earlier book, Gaige wrote, "His first name has been variously given as Samuel, Simon or Solomon. The weight of evidence does not clearly favor any of them." In a new biography of Lipschütz, Stephen Davies establishes that he used "Salomon" for official purposes but that he was called "Samuel" by family and friends.) (July 4, 1863 in Ungvár – November 30, 1905 in Hamburg) was a chess player and author. He was chess champion of the United States from 1892 to 1894.

== Biography ==
Born in Ungvár, Ung County, Carpathian Ruthenia, Austria-Hungary (now Uzhhorod, Ukraine), Lipschütz emigrated to New York City in 1880 at the age of seventeen. He soon became known in chess circles and in 1883 he was chosen as one of a team to represent the New York Chess Club in a match with the Philadelphia Chess Club, and won both of his games. In 1885 he won the championship of the New York Chess Club, and the next year he took part in the international tournament held in London, where he came sixth, including wins over Johannes Zukertort and George Henry Mackenzie. At the Sixth American Chess Congress held in New York in 1889, Lipschütz again finished sixth and was the only American player among the prize winners. Lipschütz won the U.S. Chess Championship in 1892 by defeating Jackson Whipps Showalter in a match by seven wins to one with one draw. He secured for the Manhattan Chess Club the absolute possession of the "Staats-Zeitung" challenge cup by winning New York State Chess Association matches and tournaments three times. In 1900 he won the Sexangular Tournament at the Manhattan Chess Club ahead of Frank Marshall and Showalter. Lipschütz played Emanuel Lasker twice and drew both games. Several games played by Lipschütz were published in Examples of Chess Master-Play (New Barnet, 1893).

The Chess-Player's Manual by George H. D. Gossip and S. Lipschütz (1902 reprint)

Lipschütz wrote a 122-page American Appendix to The Chess-Player's Manual (Gossip, 1888) and edited The Rice Gambit, New York, 1898. An anonymous reviewer of The Chess-Player's Manual in the New York Times praised "Mr. Lipschütz's appendix, which brings the development of the openings almost down to date". David Hooper and Kenneth Whyld write in The Oxford Companion to Chess that Lipschütz's appendix "helped to make this one of the standard opening books of the time".

William Ewart Napier recalled Lipschütz as a "frail little man, with a gentlemanly mien and manners and an extravagantly long, pointed nose—the Cyrano of Chess". According to Arthur Bisguier and Andrew Soltis, "He was a methodical attacker with some strikingly good positional ideas—and some terrible ones." As an example of the former, they quote his 1889 theoretical novelty in the Ruy Lopez, 1.e4 e5 2.Nf3 Nc6 3.Bb5 d6 4.Bxc6+ bxc6 5.d4 f6!, which World Champion Wilhelm Steinitz praised as an "excellent and novel idea". Afflicted by tuberculosis, Lipschütz left New York several times for health reasons, principally staying in Santa Fe (1893), Los Angeles (1893–95) and Florida (1904). In 1904 he travelled to Hamburg for treatment, where he had a series of operations but did not survive the treatment.

== See also ==
- List of Jewish chess players

Preceded by George Henry Mackenzie	United States Chess Champion; 1889–1890	Succeeded by Jackson Showalter
Preceded by Jackson Showalter	United States Chess Champion; 1892	Succeeded by Jackson Showalter
