= Charles Jaffe =

Russian-American chess player (1879–1941)

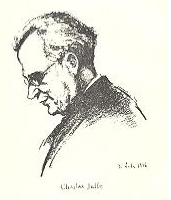
Jaffe's portrait from Jaffe's Chess Primer (1937)

Charles Jaffé (Jaffe) (c. 1879 in Dubroŭna, Russian Empire – 12 July 1941 in Brooklyn, USA) was a chess master and chess author born in the Russian Empire.

== Early life ==
Jaffé was born in the small town of Dubroŭna (now in Vitebsk Region, Belarus), Russian Empire. His precise date of birth is disputed. Different sources list his birthdate as being between 1876 and 1887. Jaffe emigrated to the United States in 1896 and settled in New York City. He worked as a silk mill merchant until he became a professional chess player in 1910.

== Chess professional ==
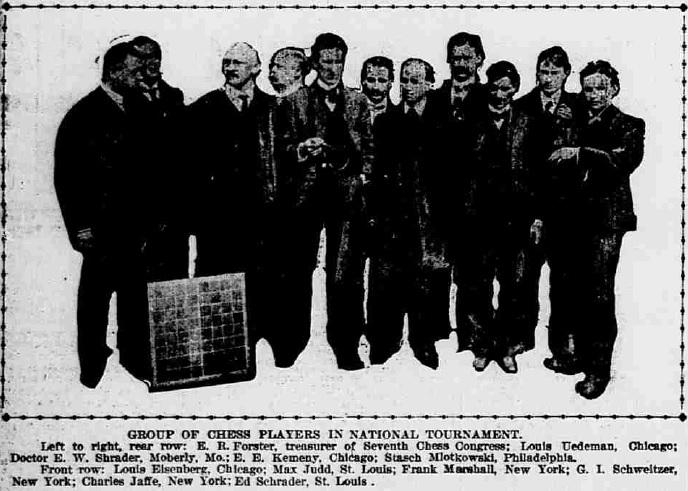
Jaffe as part of a group photo at the St. Louis tournament, 1904

In 1904, he took 7th place out of 10 players at the St. Louis (7th American Congress) with 5/11, as Frank James Marshall won. Jaffe defeated Jacques Mieses, a leading player, by 2–0 in a mini-match at New York 1907. In 1909, Jaffe took 3rd place out of 6 players with 3/5 in a small tournament at Bath Beach, Brooklyn NY (Herbert Rosenfeld won). Also in 1909, Jaffe lost a match to Frank Marshall by a score of 3.5-5.5 (+2 =3 -4). In 1911, he tied for 3rd-4th at New York, with 9/12 (Marshall won). After this career-best result, Charles Jaffe made his international debut at the Carlsbad 1911 chess tournament. There, he tied for 23rd-26th, with 8.5/25, out of 26 players (Richard Teichmann won). In 1913, he took 3rd at New York (National), with 9.5/13, behind José Raúl Capablanca and Marshall. In 1913, he lost a match to Capablanca at New York by 0.5-2.5. In a later New York tournament that same year, Jaffe scored 0.5/6 to finish 4th out of 4 players, as Marshall won.

Jaffe was nicknamed "the Crown Prince of East Side Chess" by poet and chess master Alfred Kreymborg. He often played at the Stuyvesant Chess Club, which was a hangout of chess hustlers and other interesting characters. This club had many strong players and was located on the Lower East Side. "Jaffe was famous for his poverty", and "his style was "inimitably coffeehouse". Jaffe made much of his income through challenge games and odds games played there. The colorful atmosphere of the club in that era was outlined in the book The Bobby Fischer I Knew And Other Stories.

== Controversies ==
In 1916, Jaffe became involved in a court case against the co-editor of the 'American Chess Bulletin' Hartwig Cassel involving the exclusion of some of his chess analysis of the King's Gambit and the Rice Gambit, but he lost the case despite being supported by witnesses including U.S. champion Frank Marshall. This was apparently the first American court case involving chess.

== Later career ==
In 1916, Jaffe narrowly lost a match (+4 =4 -5) to David Janowski. Then in 1917–1918, he played a return match against Janowski, this time losing by a score of (+4 =4 -10). In 1918, Jaffe tied for 3rd-5th at Rye Beach, New York (Abraham Kupchik won). In 1922, he took 2nd, behind Edward Lasker, in New York (CCI). In 1925, he took 3rd in Cedar Point, Ohio (Kupchik won). In 1926, he tied for 4-5th at Chicago (Marshall won). In 1926, he took 2nd, behind Kupchik, at New York (Quadrangular).

In 1927, Jaffe sent a cable from New York to Alexander Alekhine in Buenos Aires, where Alekhine was playing José Raúl Capablanca in the World Championship match. The cable contained Jaffe's analysis of a new variation of the Queen's Gambit, which Alekhine is thought to have used in the match. The victorious Alekhine, upon returning to New York, played a two-game match against Jaffe at the Waldorf-Astoria Hotel as a favor to Jaffe. He won both games.

== Later years, writings ==
Jaffe then mostly left competitive chess for a decade, except for occasional forays into Metropolitan League play in the mid-1930s, where he defeated a young but already very strong Reuben Fine in 1934. Jaffe lost a 1930 match at New York to Isaac Kashdan by 0–3; Kashdan was the top player in the United States at this time. Jaffe wrote Jaffe's Chess Primer in 1937, which was published by Parnassus. His health was in decline at this point. Jaffe also published several works in Yiddish. His return to chess in later life was chronicled by the writer and chess master Alfred Kreymborg in the short story Chess Reclaims a Devotee. Jaffe qualified for the finals at the 1938 U.S. Open Chess Championship at Boston, where he tied 8-9th with 4/11, as Al Horowitz won. Jaffe's final tournament was the 1939 U.S. Open Chess Championship at New York, where he qualified for the finals, but lost all 11 of his games in that group to place 12th, as Reuben Fine won. Jaffe died of a heart attack on July 12th, 1941.

== Notable chess games ==
- Charles Jaffe vs Frank Marshall, New York match 1909, Queen's Pawn Game (D02), 1-0 Although Jaffe lost this match, he fought hard and gave the U.S. Champion a stiff challenge.
- Grigory Levenfish vs Charles Jaffe, Carlsbad 1911, Queen's Gambit Declined, Semi-Slav Defence (D45), 0-1 A beautiful tactical victory over the future Soviet champion.
- Charles Jaffe vs Rudolf Spielmann, Carlsbad 1911, Queen's Pawn Game (D02), 1-0 Spielmann was known as a formidable tactician, but has to tip his King here.
- Jose Raul Capablanca vs Charles Jaffe, New York National 1913, Four Knights' Game (C49), 0-1 At this time, Capablanca was already among the world's top ten players, and would go on to become world champion in 1921.
- David Janowski vs Charles Jaffe, New York match 1916, game 2, Queen's Gambit Declined (D52), 0-1 Janowski narrowly prevailed in this match; he had earlier challenged Emanuel Lasker for the world title.
