= Charles Henry Stanley =

First chess champion of the United States

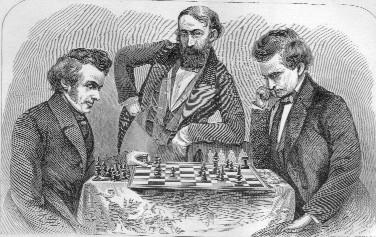
Charles Stanley (left) during his match with John Turner (right) in Washington in 1850

Charles Henry Stanley (September 2, 1819 – October 6, 1901) was the first chess champion of the United States. When the first U.S. championship match took place in 1845, Stanley defeated Eugène Rousseau of New Orleans, and claimed the title of U.S. Chess Champion.

== Chess career ==
Stanley was an Englishman who emigrated from London to New York in 1843 to work in the British Consulate, and his English ideas had a great influence on American chess.

Stanley defeated Eugène Rousseau of New Orleans in 1845 to claim the title as the first U.S. Chess Champion.

One of his ideas was to have a regular newspaper column devoted to chess, which he started in 1845 in The Spirit of the Times. He also started the American Chess Magazine in 1846, which together with The Chess Palladium and Mathematical Sphinx were the first American chess magazines. However, other magazines soon followed and competition forced them out of business. In 1846 he published the first US book on a chess match, 31 Games of Chess and became secretary of the New York Chess Club. In 1855 Stanley organized the first World Problem Tournament. In 1849 he helped future chess master Johann Löwenthal, who was then a penniless immigrant.

He was one of the participants in the 1st American Chess Congress, which he played in 1857 where Paul Morphy won, and he was regarded as the new U.S. Chess Champion. He had some matches against Benjamin Raphael, the results of which are unknown. After the 1st American Chess Congress he lost a match against Morphy in 1857.

In 1860 he returned to England, but in the years he was away, the standard of play had increased greatly and, failing to achieve any success he returned to the United States two years later.

== Personal life and death ==
Stanley was born to John and Anna Stanley in England on September 2, 1819. He married Sarah Weir in 1850, and had a daughter, Pauline.

His job at the British consulate in New York involved him in diplomatic incident in 1855. The British minister to the United States John F. Crampton had orders to surreptitiously recruit Americans as soldiers in the Crimean War. But the U.S. was neutral, and even friendly to the opposing side, Russia. Stanley was one of several operatives involved who spilled information after getting drunk, and the affair ended with Crampton (but not Stanley) being expelled by President Pierce.

Morphy never accepted prize money for his wins, and sent the earnings from his 1857 match directly to Stanley's wife, pregnant at the time. Stanley acknowledged the generosity by naming his daughter after Morphy, and publishing Morphy's Match Games.

Stanley and his wife both died in 1901. He battled alcoholism his entire life, and spent his last twenty years institutionalized. He died at the Home for Incurables on October 6, 1901, and was buried at Green-Wood Cemetery.

Preceded by none	United States Chess Champion; 1845–1857	Succeeded by Paul Morphy
