= Henry Bird (chess player) =

English chess player and author (1829–1908)

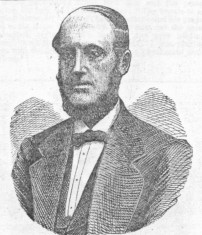
- Born: 14 July 1829; Portsea, Portsmouth, Hampshire, England
- Died: 11 April 1908 (aged 78); London, England
- Known for: Bird's opening

Henry Edward Bird (14 July 1829 – 11 April 1908) was an English chess player, author and accountant. He wrote the books Chess History and Reminiscences and An Analysis of Railways in the United Kingdom.

Although Bird was a practising accountant, not a professional chess player, it has been said that he "lived for chess, and would play anybody anywhere, any time, under any conditions."

== Tournament play ==
At age 21, Bird was invited to the first international tournament, London 1851. He also participated in tournaments held in Vienna and New York City. In 1858 he lost a match to Paul Morphy at age 28, yet he played high-level chess for another 50 years. In the New York tournament of 1876, Bird received the first brilliancy prize ever awarded, for his game against James Mason.

== Legacy ==
In 1874 Bird proposed a new chess variant, which played on an 8×10 board and contained two new pieces: guard (combining the moves of the rook and knight) and equerry (combining the bishop and knight). Bird's chess inspired José Raúl Capablanca to create another chess variant, Capablanca Chess, which would ultimately differ from Bird's chess only by the starting position.

It was Bird who popularised the chess opening now called Bird's Opening (1.f4), as well as Bird's Defence to the Ruy Lopez (1.e4 e5 2.Nf3 Nc6 3.Bb5 Nd4). Bird's Opening is considered sound, though not the best try for an opening advantage. Bird's Defence is regarded as slightly inferior, but "trappy".

== Bibliography ==
- Bird, H. E. Chess Masterpieces (London: Dean, 1875)
- Bird, H. E. The Chess Openings, Considered Critically and Practically (London: Dean, 1877; New York: Lockwood, 1880, 1886)
- Bird, H. E. Chess Practice (London: Sampson Low, Marston, Searle & Rivington, 1882; Sampson Low, Marston & Company, 1892)
- Bird, H. E. Chess History and Reminiscences (London: Dean, 1893)
- Bird, H. E. Chess Novelties and Their Latest Developments (London, New York: F. Warne, 1895)

== See also ==
- Bird's Defence
- Bird's Opening
