= Amos Burn =

English chess player (1848–1925)

- Burn c. 1920

Personal information
- Born: 31 December 1848 Kingston upon Hull, England
- Died: 25 November 1925 (aged 76) London, England

Chess career
- Country: England

Amos Burn (31 December 1848 – 25 November 1925) was an English chess player, one of the world's leading players at the end of the 19th century, and a chess writer.

Burn was born on New Year's Eve, 1848, in Hull. As a teenager he moved to Liverpool, becoming apprenticed to a firm of shipowners and merchants. He learned chess only at the relatively late age of 16. He later took chess lessons from future World Champion Wilhelm Steinitz in London, and, like his teacher, became known for his superior defensive ability. Aron Nimzowitsch, in his book The Praxis of My System, named Burn one of the world's six greatest defensive players.

Although never a professional chess player, Burn had a long career of playing tournaments and writing.

In 1913, Leopold Hoffer, the editor for over 30 years of the chess column in The Field, the leading chess column in Great Britain, died. The proprietors of The Field took seven weeks to select a successor, finally settling on Burn. He moved to London and wrote the column until his death in 1925 from a stroke.

== Tournament history ==
Burn's first tournament, in 1867–68, was a handicap tournament at the Liverpool Chess Club. Placed in the second level, where he received pawn-and-move odds from the four top-seeded players and gave odds of up to a knight to the other players, Burn won easily, scoring 24 out of 25 possible points. His first major tournament was the Third Challenge Cup of the British Chess Association (London 1870), where he surprised the pundits by tying for first with John Wisker, ahead of Joseph Henry Blackburne and others, but lost the playoff to Wisker. His last was Breslau 1912, where he finished 12th of 18 players, scoring 7.5 out of 17 possible points.

Burn's greatest tournament results were equal first at London 1887 with Isidor Gunsberg (ahead of Blackburne and Johannes Zukertort), first at Amsterdam 1889 (ahead of a young Emanuel Lasker), second at Breslau 1889 (behind Siegbert Tarrasch), and first at Cologne 1898 (ahead of Rudolf Charousek, Mikhail Chigorin, Carl Schlechter, David Janowski, and Wilhelm Steinitz). He also played at Hastings 1895, the strongest tournament held up to that point, finishing in joint twelfth place with 9½ points out of 21.

== Legacy ==
Burn is the eponym of the Burn Variation of the French Defence (1.e4 e6 2.d4 d5 3.Nc3 Nf6 4.Bg5 dxe4). The line had been played before, including by Albert Clerc against Adolf Anderssen at Paris 1878. Burn's first known game with the variation was against Charles Locock at Bradford 1888. However, Burn "was the first to adopt it regularly and with good results", scoring nine wins, one draw, and five losses with it.

In 2004, the Swiss IM Richard Forster published the 972-page Amos Burn: A Chess Biography. Viktor Korchnoi observed in its foreword that "this work accords [Burn] the recognition he deserves, painstakingly assembling and analysing all available games and biographical material about him."

== Sample games ==
In one of Burn's last tournaments, he won as White against the young Alexander Alekhine:

Burn–Alekhine, Karlsbad 1911
1.e4 e6 2.d4 d5 3.Nc3 Nf6 4.Bg5 Be7 5.e5 Ne4 6.Bxe7 Qxe7 7.Bd3 Nxc3 8.bxc3 c5 9.Nf3 Nc6 10.O-O c4 11.Be2 Bd7 12.Qd2 b5 13.Ne1 a5 14.a3 O–O 15.f4 b4 16.axb4 axb4 17.Rxa8 Rxa8 18.cxb4 Qxb4 19.c3 Qb3 20.Bd1 Ra2 21.Qc1 Qb6 22.Rf2 Qa7 23.Rxa2 Qxa2 24.Nc2 h6 25.Qa1 Qxa1 26.Nxa1 Na7 27.Kf2 Bc6 28.Ke3 Nb5 29.Kd2 Kf8 30.Nc2 Ke7 31.Ne3 f5 32.Bf3 Kd7 33.g4 fxg4 34.Bxg4 g6 35.Bd1 Ke7 36.Ng4 h5 37.Ne3 Kf7 38.Ng2 Kg7 39.Nh4 Be8 40.Nf3 Kf7 41.Kc2 Bd7 42.Kb2 Na7 43.Ka3 Nc6 44.Ba4 Ke7 45.Nh4 Kf7 46.Bxc6 Bxc6 47.Kb4 Be8 48.Nf3 Ke7 49.Ng5 Bc6 50.Ka3 Bd7 51.Kb2 Ba4 52.Kc1 Bb3 53.Nf3 Ba4 54.Nh4 Kf7 55.Ng2 Bd7 56.h4 Be8 57.Kb2 Ba4 58.Ne3 Ke7 59.Ka3 Bc6 60.Kb4 Kd7 61.Ka5 Kc7 62.Nc2 Kb7 63.Nb4 Bd7 64.Na6 Be8 65.Nc5+ Kc6 66.Nxe6 Bd7 67.Ng5 Bf5 68.Kb4 Bg4 69.Ka3 Kd7 70.Nf7 Be6 71.Nd6 Kc6 72.Kb2 Bg4 73.Kc2 Kd7 74.Kd2 Ke6 75.Ke3 Bh3 76.f5+ gxf5 77.Kf4 Bg4 78.Kg5 Bh3 79.Ne8 Kf7 80.Nf6 f4 81.Kxf4 Be6 82.Kg5 1–0

Macdonald–Burn, Liverpool 1910

Position: g1 white rook, h2 white king, f2 white pawn, d2 white queen, h3 white pawn, b3 white pawn, h4 black knight, c4 white pawn, h5 white bishop, g5 black bishop, e5 black pawn, d5 white pawn, c5 black pawn, a5 white pawn, d6 black pawn, g7 black king, c7 black rook, b7 black pawn, a7 black pawn, c8 black queen

Position after White's 33rd move

Macdonald-Burn, Liverpool 1910

At right is a position from one of Burn's offhand games. At first blush, Black's position looks resignable: it appears that his bishop, attacked twice and pinned to his king, will fall and he will soon be checkmated. Burn produced the staggering 33...Qg4!!, leaving his queen en prise to three different white pieces. However, if 34.Bxg4 or hxg4, Black wins with 34...Bxd2. If 34.Qxg5+, 34...Qxg5 35.Rxg5+ Kh6 and Black wins a piece and the game. Macdonald instead tried 34.Rxg4 Nf3+ 35.Kg2 Nxd2 36.Rxg5+ Kh6 37.h4 Nxb3 38.Rf5 Nxa5 and Burn won in 11 more moves.

Burns' biographer Richard Forster calls the move "without doubt the most extraordinary of his career." Chess journalist Tim Krabbé considers 33...Qg4!! one of the ten most fantastic moves ever played, noting that it is a rare example of the Novotny theme in practical play.
