= James Mason (chess player) =

Irish-American chess player (1849–1905)

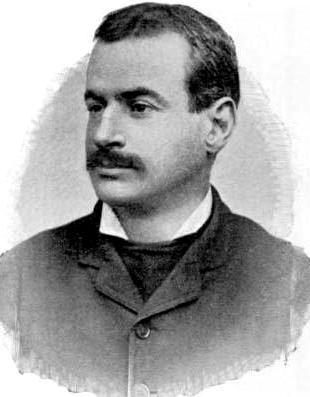
- Mason, c. 1870

Personal information
- Born: 19 November 1849 Kilkenny, Ireland
- Died: 12 January 1905 (aged 55) Rochford, Essex, England

Chess career
- Country: United States (before 1882); United Kingdom (after 1882)

James Mason (19 November 1849 – 12 January 1905) was an Irish-American chess player, journalist and writer who became one of the world's best half-dozen players in the 1880s. Mason was ranked the number 1 player in the world by Chessmetrics during 11 separate months between August 1877 and June 1878.

== Biography ==
Mason was born in Kilkenny in Ireland. He was adopted as a child and took the name James Mason (his original birth name was unknown) when his family moved to the United States in 1861. There he learned chess and eventually secured a job at the New York Herald.

Mason made his first mark on the chess scene in 1876 when he won the Fourth American Chess Congress in Philadelphia, the New York Clipper tournament, and defeated Henry Bird in a match by the comfortable margin of 13–6. In 1878 he settled in England. His best tournament results were third at the strong Vienna 1882 tournament, third at Nuremberg 1883 and equal second at Hamburg 1885. At Hastings 1895, often considered the strongest tournament of the nineteenth century, he finished tied for 12th–14th with 9½ points of 21 possible.

Mason wrote several books on chess, the most popular being The Principles of Chess in Theory and Practice (1894), The Art of Chess (1895), Chess Openings (1897) and Social Chess (1900).

In 1903 he became seriously ill and had to curtail almost all activities for the remainder of his life. He died on 12 January 1905 in Rochford, Essex, and is buried in nearby Thundersley churchyard.

== Chess strength ==
According to Chessmetrics, at his peak in October 1876 Mason's play was equivalent to a Chessmetrics rating of 2715, and he was ranked number 2 in the world, behind only Wilhelm Steinitz. However, Mason was ranked number 1 in the world, albeit with a slightly lower rating, during 11 separate months between August 1877 and June 1878. His best single performance was at Vienna 1882, where he scored 15 of 23 possible points (65%) against 2622-rated opposition, for a performance rating of 2732.

== Legacy ==
The London System opening 1.d4 d5 2.Bf4 is sometimes called the Mason Variation in his honour; he played it several times from the 1880s. The variation of the King's Gambit 1.e4 e5 2.f4 exf4 3.Nc3 (allowing 3...Qh4+) is sometimes called the Mason Gambit or Keres Gambit, although Mason lost the only game he played with it (against Samuel Rosenthal at Paris 1878). The 1.e4 e5 2.Nf3 Nf6 3.Nxe5 d6 4.Nf3 Nxe4 5.d4 d5 6.Bd3 Be7 7.0-0 0-0 variation of the Petroff Defence is named after him, as well as the Mason Gambit in the Giuoco Piano: 1.e4 e5 2.Nf3 Nc6 3.Bc4 Bc5 4.c3 Nf6 5.d4 exd4 6.0-0.

== Books ==
- James Mason (1894). The Principles of Chess in Theory and Practice. Horace Cox, Windsor House, Bream's Buildings, E.C.
- James Mason (1895). The Art of Chess. Horace Cox, Windsor House, Bream's Buildings, E.C.
- James Mason and W. H. K. Pollock (1896). Games in the St. Petersburg Tournament, 1895-96. Whitehead and Miller, Printers.
- James Mason (1897). Chess Openings. Horace Cox, Windsor House, Bream's Buildings, E.C.
- James Mason (1900). Social Chess: a Collection of Short and Brilliant Games With Historical and Practical Illustrations. Horace Cox, Windsor House, Bream's Buildings, E.C.
