= Abraham Kupchik =

American chess player (1892–1970)

Abraham Kupchik (25 March 1892 – 26 November 1970) was an American chess master.

Abraham Kupchik

Abraham Kupchik was born into a Jewish family in Brest (then Russian Empire, now Belarus) to parents Pinchas Kupchik and Bessie Kupchik née Perlmutter. His family immigrated to the US in 1903.

He was an accountant by profession.

He won the Manhattan Chess Club Championship ten times outright and once shared. In 1915, he tied for third/fourth place with Oscar Chajes, behind José Raúl Capablanca and Frank James Marshall in New York. In 1916, he tied for 2nd-4th with Dawid Janowski and Borislav Kostić, behind Capablanca, in New York. In 1918, he won at Rye Beach, N.Y.

After World War I, he won at Troy 1919 (New York State-ch). He was equal first with Marshall at Lake Hopatcong 1923 (the Ninth American Chess Congress). In 1924, he lost a match to Efim Bogoljubow (+1 −3 =2) in New York. In 1925 he drew a match with Carlos Torre Repetto (+1 −1 =4) in New York. In 1926, he finished 2nd, behind Capablanca, in Lake Hopatcong.

Kupchik played for the US team in the 6th Chess Olympiad at Warsaw 1935. He scored (+6 -0 =8) on third board, and won the individual bronze medal and team gold medal. He played on Board 9 in the 1945 USSR-US radio match, losing ½-1½ to Vladimir Makogonov.

== See also ==
- List of Jewish chess players
