= Max Weiss (chess player) =

Austrian chess player (1857–1927)

Miksa Weisz (21 July 1857 – 14 March 1927), better known as Max Weiss, was an Austrian chess player born in the Kingdom of Hungary.

Weiss was born in Sereď. Moving to Vienna, he studied mathematics and physics at the university, and later taught those subjects. Weiss learned to play chess at age 12, and his strength increased steadily throughout the 1880s.

- 1880, Graz, tied with Adolf Schwarz and Johannes Minckwitz for first prize.
- 1882, Vienna, tenth, won two games from Johann Zukertort, and drew with Wilhelm Steinitz.
- 1883, Nuremberg, tenth.
- 1885, Hamburg, tied with Berthold Englisch and Siegbert Tarrasch for second prize.
- 1887, Frankfurt, divided second and third prizes with Joseph Henry Blackburne.
- 1888, Bradford, tied with Blackburne for sixth prize.
- 1889, New York, (the sixth American Chess Congress), scored +24−4=10 to tie with Mikhail Chigorin for first prize, ahead of Isidor Gunsberg and Blackburne.
- 1889, Breslau, third prize.
- 1890, Vienna, first prize, ahead of Johann Bauer and Englisch.

The New York 1889 tournament was organized to find a challenger for the World Chess Championship, but neither Chigorin (who had already lost a championship match) nor Weiss pursued a title match with Steinitz. In fact, having become one of the top players in the world, Weiss quit international chess after this tournament, though he did play a few Viennese events. In 1895 he defeated Georg Marco in a match, +5−1=1, and he tied for first in the 1895–6 winter tournament with Carl Schlechter. Around this time, Weiss began working to create a Viennese school of chess players.

In 1905, Weiss was employed by S M von Rothschild bank in Vienna. His chess writings, Schachmeister-Streiche (Mühlhausen 1918), Kleines Schachlehrbuch (Mühlhausen 1920), and the earlier problem collection Caissa Bambergensis (Bamberg 1902), are little remembered today. In 1927 Weiss died in Vienna, Austria.

== See also ==
- List of Jewish chess players
