= Dawid Janowski =

Polish-French chess player (1868–1967)

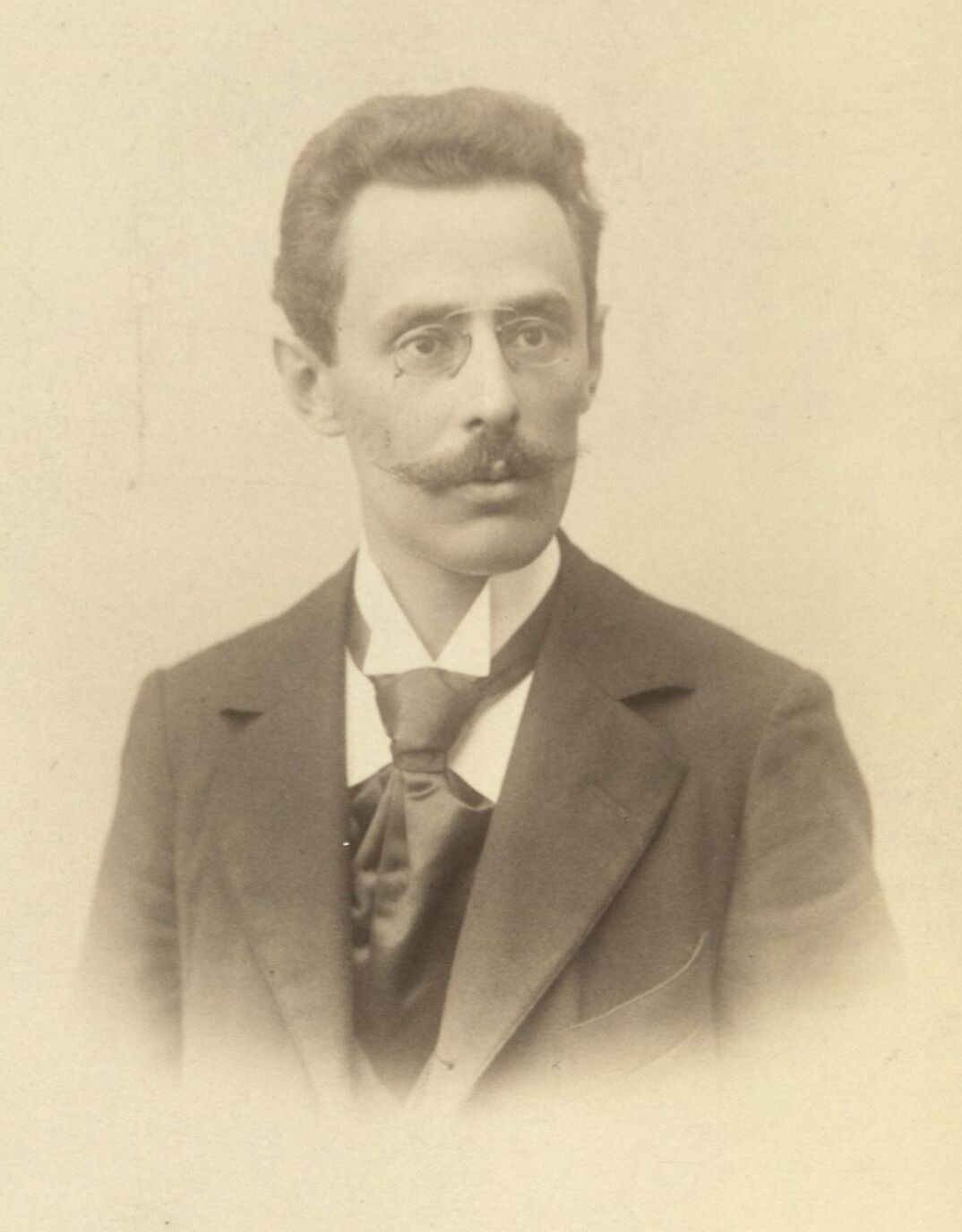
- Janowski, c. 1910

Personal information
- Born: Dawid Markelowicz Janowski; 25 May 1868 Wołkowysk, Grodno Governorate, Russian Empire (modern Vawkavysk, Belarus)
- Died: 15 January 1927 (aged 58) Hyères, Var, France

Chess career
- Country: France (until 1918); Poland (1918–1927)

Dawid Markelowicz Janowski [ˈdavit markɛˈlɔvit͡ʂ jaˈnɔfski] (25 May 1868 – 15 January 1927; often spelled David) was a Polish chess player. Several opening variations are named after Janowski.

== Biography ==
Born into a Jewish-Polish family in Wołkowysk, Russian Empire (now Belarus), he settled in Paris around 1890 and began his professional chess career in 1894. He won tournaments in Monte Carlo 1901 and Hanover 1902 and tied for first at Vienna 1902.

Janowski was devastating against the older masters such as Wilhelm Steinitz (+5−2), Mikhail Chigorin (+17−4=4) and Joseph Henry Blackburne (+6−2=2). He had minus scores, however, against newer players such as Siegbert Tarrasch (+5−9=3), Frank Marshall (+28−34=18), Akiba Rubinstein (+3−5), Géza Maróczy (+5−10=5) and Carl Schlechter (+13−20=13). He was outclassed by world champions Emanuel Lasker (+4−25=7) and José Raúl Capablanca (+1−9=1) but scored respectably against Alexander Alekhine (+2−4=2). In particular, he was able to beat at least once each of the first four world champions, a feat shared with Siegbert Tarrasch alone.

Janowski played three matches against Emanuel Lasker: two friendly matches in 1909 (+2−2 and +1−7=2) and one match for the world chess championship in 1910 (−8=3). The longer 1909 match has sometimes been called a world championship match, but research by Edward Winter indicates that the title was not at stake.

In July–August 1914, he was playing an international chess tournament, the 19th DSB Congress (German Chess Federation Congress) in Mannheim, Germany, with four wins, four draws and three losses (seventh place), when World War I broke out. Players at Mannheim representing countries now at war with Germany were interned. He, as well as Alexander Alekhine, was interned but released to Switzerland after a short internment. In 1915, he left Europe for the United States and spent the next nine years there before returning to Paris. At New York 1916, in the final, he shared second place with Oscar Chajes after José Raúl Capablanca. He won at Atlantic City 1921 (the eighth American Chess Congress) and took third place at Lake Hopatcong 1923 (the ninth ACC).

He died in France on 15 January 1927 of tuberculosis.

== Playing style ==
Janowski played very quickly and was known as a sharp tactician who was devastating with the bishop pair. Capablanca annotated some Janowski games with great admiration and said, "when in form, [he] is one of the most feared opponents who can exist". Capablanca noted that Janowski's greatest weakness as a player was in the endgame, and Janowski reportedly told him, "I detest the endgame." American champion Frank Marshall remembered Janowski's talent and his stubbornness. In Marshall's Best Games of Chess he wrote that Janowski "could follow the wrong path with greater determination than any man I ever met!" Reuben Fine remembered Janowski as a player of considerable talent but a "master of the alibi" with respect to his defeats. Fine said that his losses invariably occurred because it was too hot or too cold or the windows were open too far or not far enough. He also noted that Janowski was sometimes unpopular with his colleagues because of his predilection for doggedly playing on even in an obviously lost position, hoping his opponent might blunder. Edward Lasker in his book Chess Secrets I Learned from the Masters recalled that Janowski was an inveterate but undisciplined gambler who would often lose all of his chess winnings at the roulette wheel.

== Legacy ==
Several opening variations carry Janowski's name.

Janowski Variation
in the Old Indian Defence

Position: a8 black rook, b8 black knight, d8 black queen, e8 black king, f8 black bishop, h8 black rook, a7 black pawn, b7 black pawn, c7 black pawn, e7 black pawn, f7 black pawn, g7 black pawn, h7 black pawn, d6 black pawn, f6 black knight, f5 black bishop, c4 white pawn, d4 white pawn, c3 white knight, a2 white pawn, b2 white pawn, e2 white pawn, f2 white pawn, g2 white pawn, h2 white pawn, a1 white rook, c1 white bishop, d1 white queen, e1 white king, f1 white bishop, g1 white knight, h1 white rook

1.d4 Nf6 2.c4 d6 3.Nc3 Bf5
Janowski Variation
in the Queen's Gambit Declined

Position: a8 black rook, b8 black knight, c8 black bishop, d8 black queen, e8 black king, f8 black bishop, g8 black knight, h8 black rook, b7 black pawn, c7 black pawn, f7 black pawn, g7 black pawn, h7 black pawn, a6 black pawn, e6 black pawn, d5 black pawn, c4 white pawn, d4 white pawn, c3 white knight, a2 white pawn, b2 white pawn, e2 white pawn, f2 white pawn, g2 white pawn, h2 white pawn, a1 white rook, c1 white bishop, d1 white queen, e1 white king, f1 white bishop, g1 white knight, h1 white rook

1.d4 d5 2.c4 e6 3.Nc3 a6
Showalter vs. Janowski, London 1899
Janowski Variation (Note: Primarily called the Botvinnik Variation.)
in the Queen's Gambit Declined

Position: a8 black rook, c8 black bishop, d8 black queen, f8 black rook, g8 black king, a7 black pawn, b7 black pawn, c7 black pawn, d7 black knight, e7 black bishop, f7 black pawn, g7 black pawn, h7 black pawn, e6 black pawn, f6 black knight, d5 black pawn, g5 white bishop, d4 white pawn, e4 white pawn, c3 white knight, d3 white bishop, e3 white pawn, f3 white knight, a2 white pawn, b2 white pawn, f2 white pawn, g2 white pawn, h2 white pawn, a1 white rook, d1 white queen, e1 white king, h1 white rook

1.d4 d5 2.c4 e6 3.Nc3 Nf6 4.Bg5 Be7 5.e3 0-0 6.Nf3 Nbd7 7.Bd3
Janowski vs. Goetz, Paris 1896
Janowski Variation (Note: Sometimes called the New York Variation.)
in the Queen's Gambit Declined

Position: a8 black rook, c8 black bishop, d8 black queen, f8 black rook, g8 black king, a7 black pawn, b7 black pawn, d7 black knight, e7 black bishop, f7 black pawn, g7 black pawn, h7 black pawn, c6 black pawn, e6 black pawn, d5 black knight, g5 white bishop, c4 white bishop, d4 white pawn, h4 white pawn, c3 white knight, e3 white pawn, f3 white knight, a2 white pawn, b2 white pawn, f2 white pawn, g2 white pawn, c1 white rook, d1 white queen, e1 white king, h1 white rook

1.d4 d5 2.c4 e6 3.Nc3 Nf6 4.Bg5 Be7 5.e3 0-0 6.Nf3 Nbd7 7.Rc1 c6 8.Bd3 dxc4 9.Bxc4 Nd5 10.h4
Janowski vs. Capablanca, New York 1924
Janowski–Larsen Variation (Note: Sometimes called the Modern Variation.)
in the Queen's Gambit Accepted

Position: a8 black rook, b8 black knight, d8 black queen, e8 black king, f8 black bishop, h8 black rook, a7 black pawn, b7 black pawn, c7 black pawn, e7 black pawn, f7 black pawn, g7 black pawn, h7 black pawn, f6 black knight, c4 black pawn, d4 white pawn, g4 black bishop, e3 white pawn, f3 white knight, a2 white pawn, b2 white pawn, f2 white pawn, g2 white pawn, h2 white pawn, a1 white rook, b1 white knight, c1 white bishop, d1 white queen, e1 white king, f1 white bishop, h1 white rook

1.d4 d5 2.c4 dxc4 3.Nf3 Nf6 4.e3 Bg4
Marshall vs. Janowski, St. Petersburg 1914
Szabó vs. Larsen, Portoroz 1958
Janowski Variation
in the Albin Countergambit

Position: a8 black rook, c8 black bishop, d8 black queen, e8 black king, f8 black bishop, g8 black knight, h8 black rook, a7 black pawn, b7 black pawn, c7 black pawn, g7 black pawn, h7 black pawn, c6 black knight, f6 black pawn, e5 white pawn, c4 white pawn, d4 black pawn, f3 white knight, a2 white pawn, b2 white pawn, d2 white knight, e2 white pawn, f2 white pawn, g2 white pawn, h2 white pawn, a1 white rook, c1 white bishop, d1 white queen, e1 white king, f1 white bishop, h1 white rook

1.d4 d5 2.c4 e5 3.dxe5 d4 4.Nf3 Nc6 5.Nbd2 f6
Bernstein vs. Janowski, Barmen 1905
Janowski Variation
in the French Defence

Position: a8 black rook, b8 black knight, c8 black bishop, d8 black queen, e8 black king, h8 black rook, a7 black pawn, b7 black pawn, c7 black pawn, f7 black pawn, g7 black pawn, e6 black pawn, f6 black knight, h6 black pawn, d5 black pawn, e5 white pawn, b4 black bishop, d4 white pawn, c3 white knight, e3 white bishop, a2 white pawn, b2 white pawn, c2 white pawn, f2 white pawn, g2 white pawn, h2 white pawn, a1 white rook, d1 white queen, e1 white king, f1 white bishop, g1 white knight, h1 white rook

1.e4 e6 2.d4 d5 3.Nc3 Nf6 4.Bg5 Bb4 5.e5 h6 6.Be3
Janowski vs. Burn, Ostend 1907
Janowski Variation (Note: Primarily called the Alapin Variation.)
in the French Defence

Position: a8 black rook, b8 black knight, c8 black bishop, d8 black queen, e8 black king, f8 black bishop, g8 black knight, h8 black rook, a7 black pawn, b7 black pawn, c7 black pawn, f7 black pawn, g7 black pawn, h7 black pawn, e6 black pawn, d5 black pawn, d4 white pawn, e4 white pawn, e3 white bishop, a2 white pawn, b2 white pawn, c2 white pawn, f2 white pawn, g2 white pawn, h2 white pawn, a1 white rook, b1 white knight, d1 white queen, e1 white king, f1 white bishop, g1 white knight, h1 white rook

1.e4 e6 2.d4 d5 3.Be3
Janowski Variation
in the Four Knights Game

Position: a8 black rook, c8 black bishop, d8 black queen, f8 black rook, g8 black king, a7 black pawn, b7 black pawn, c7 black pawn, f7 black pawn, g7 black pawn, h7 black pawn, c6 black knight, d6 black pawn, f6 black knight, b5 white bishop, e5 black pawn, e4 white pawn, c3 white pawn, d3 white pawn, f3 white knight, a2 white pawn, c2 white pawn, f2 white pawn, g2 white pawn, h2 white pawn, a1 white rook, c1 white bishop, d1 white queen, e1 white rook, g1 white king

1.e4 e5 2.Nf3 Nc6 3.Nc3 Nf6 4.Bb5 Bb4 5.0-0 0-0 6.d3 Bxc3 7.bxc3 d6 8.Re1
Janowski vs. Pillsbury, Paris 1900
