= Anglo-American cable chess matches =

Yearly chess cable match from 1896 to 1911

The Anglo-American cable chess matches were a series of yearly chess matches between teams from the United States and Great Britain conducted over transatlantic cable from 1896 to 1911, except for the three-year gap of 1904 to 1906 when no matches were held. This series was closely contested, with each team winning six matches and one match being drawn. The individual game total over the series was also even (+39 −39 =50). The series ended when Great Britain won their third consecutive match, thereby earning permanent custody of the silver cup provided by Sir George Newnes. There were other cable matches held in the late 19th and early 20th centuries, but this series is the most well-known.

Prominent players from both sides of the Atlantic would participate over the years. Some who played for Great Britain included Joseph Blackburne, Amos Burn, Henry Bird, Henry Atkins, Horatio Caro, James Mason, Frederick Yates, Sir George Thomas, and Thomas Lawrence. Some who played for the United States included Harry Pillsbury, Jackson Showalter, Frank Marshall, Albert Hodges, Eugene Delmar, and John Barry.

== Background ==
Hooper and Whyld call the first half of the 19th century the "golden age" of correspondence chess. With travel difficult and expensive, chess clubs began to play games with distant clubs by mail. Examples of early matches were between Edinburgh and London from 1824–1828 and between Paris and various other cities in the 1830s and 1840s. Individual correspondence chess did not become popular until postage rates declined to more affordable levels. Thus, such matches were becoming increasingly common.

Development of the electrical telegraph made a new technology available to chess clubs. The first known match by telegraph was between Washington and Baltimore in 1844. Other early matches were Liverpool versus Dublin in 1861, Liverpool versus Calcutta in 1880–1881, London versus Petersburg in 1886–1887, Petersburg versus Paris in 1894–1895, and Petersburg versus Vienna in 1898–1899. These matches were not played in one session, but were conducted over a longer time period as in chess played via mail.

The first attempt at a same-session cable match and the direct predecessor of the Anglo-American series was a match between the British Chess Club and the Manhattan Chess Club on 9 March 1895. Only one of the ten games concluded by the time the London hall was required to close, a draw being agreed. Emanuel Lasker, charged with adjudicating unfinished games, suggested draws on the nine remaining boards and this was acceptable to both clubs.

== The matches ==
Drawing on experience with the 1895 cable match played by the Manhattan club, the Brooklyn Chess Club organized the first Anglo-American chess match. Participation was restricted to native citizens, and play was held for two four-hour sessions per day over two days. The time limit was 20 moves per hour. The Brooklyn club suggested eight players per team and the British club preferred ten players per team. The first match in 1896 used eight players per team, but all subsequent matches used ten players per team. As before, Emanuel Lasker would adjudicate any unfinished games, although over the course of the series adjudication would not be required until the tenth match of the series. Sir George Newnes was president of the British Chess Club and he provided the silver cup that would go to the winning team until the next match. Negotiation of conditions were substantially complete by the end of 1895, but the match itself would not take place until the spring of 1896.

=== 1896 match ===
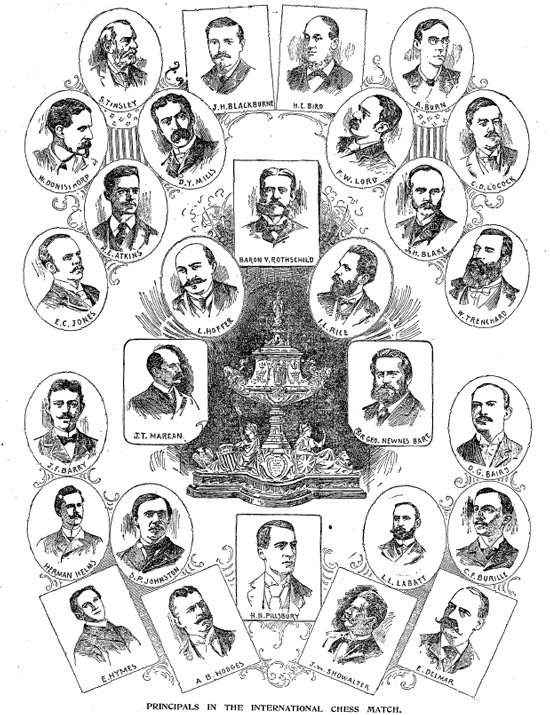
Principals in the 1896 international chess cable match along with the $800 Sir George Newnes Cup

The first match of the series was held 13–14 March 1896. The United States team had white on the odd-numbered boards and the British team had white on the even-numbered boards. The United States team won by a single game.

Board	United States	Great Britain	Winner
1	Pillsbury	Blackburne	GB
2	Showalter	Burn	US
3	Burille	Bird	US
4	Barry	Tinsley	US
5	Hymes	Locock	draw
6	Hodges	Mills	draw
7	Delmar	Atkins	draw
8	Baird	Jackson	GB
Total	4½	3½	US

=== 1897 match ===
The 1897 match was held 12–13 February 1897. The British team had white on the odd-numbered boards and the United States team had white on the even-numbered boards. The British team won by a single game, tying the series at one match each.

Board	United States	Great Britain	Winner
1	Pillsbury	Blackburne	draw
2	Showalter	Locock	US
3	Burille	Atkins	GB
4	Barry	Lawrence	US
5	Hymes	Mills	draw
6	Hodges	Bellingham	draw
7	Delmar	Blake	US
8	Helms	Jackson	GB
9	Teed	Cole	GB
10	McCutcheon	Jacobs	GB
Total	4½	5½	GB

=== 1898 match ===
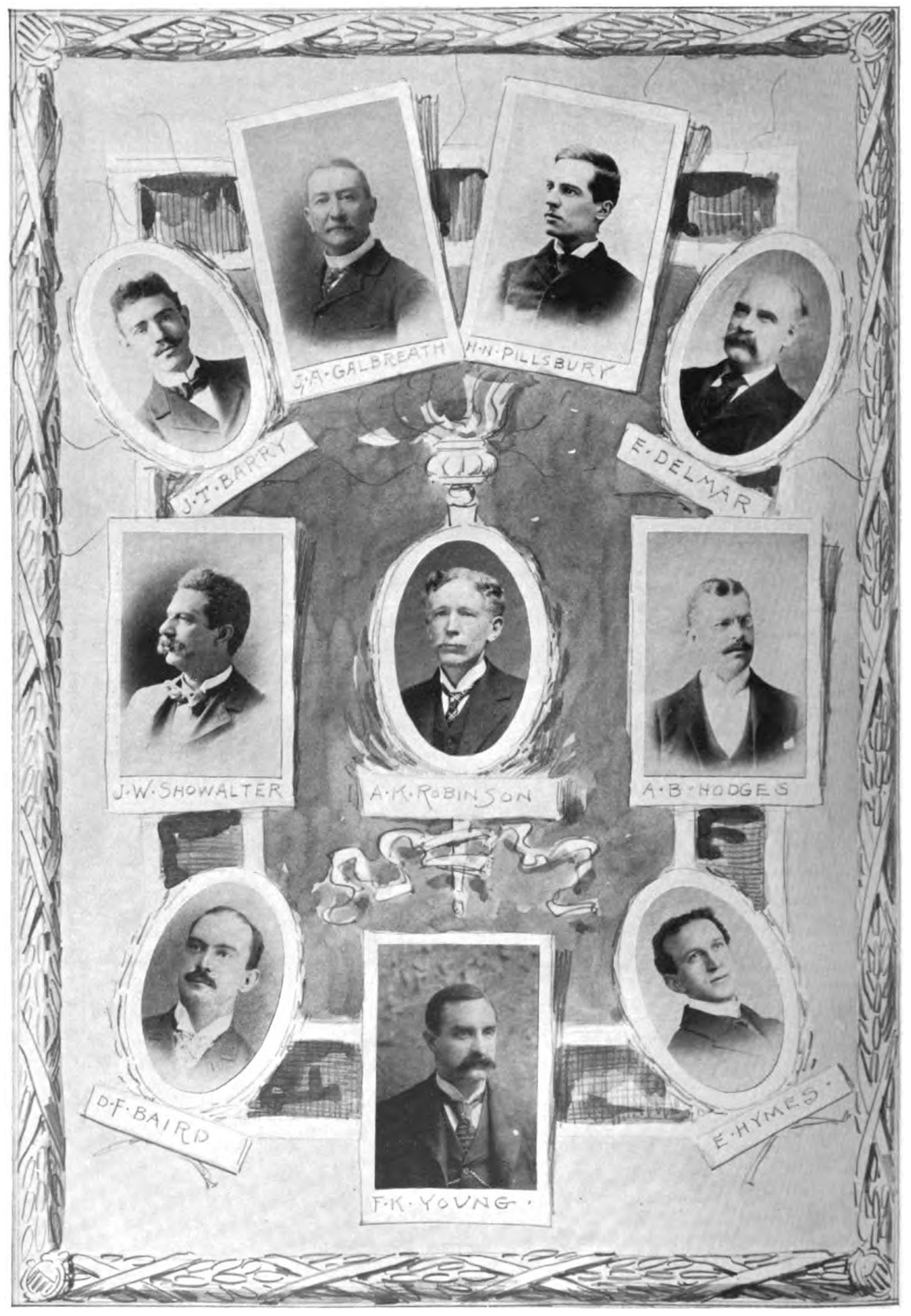
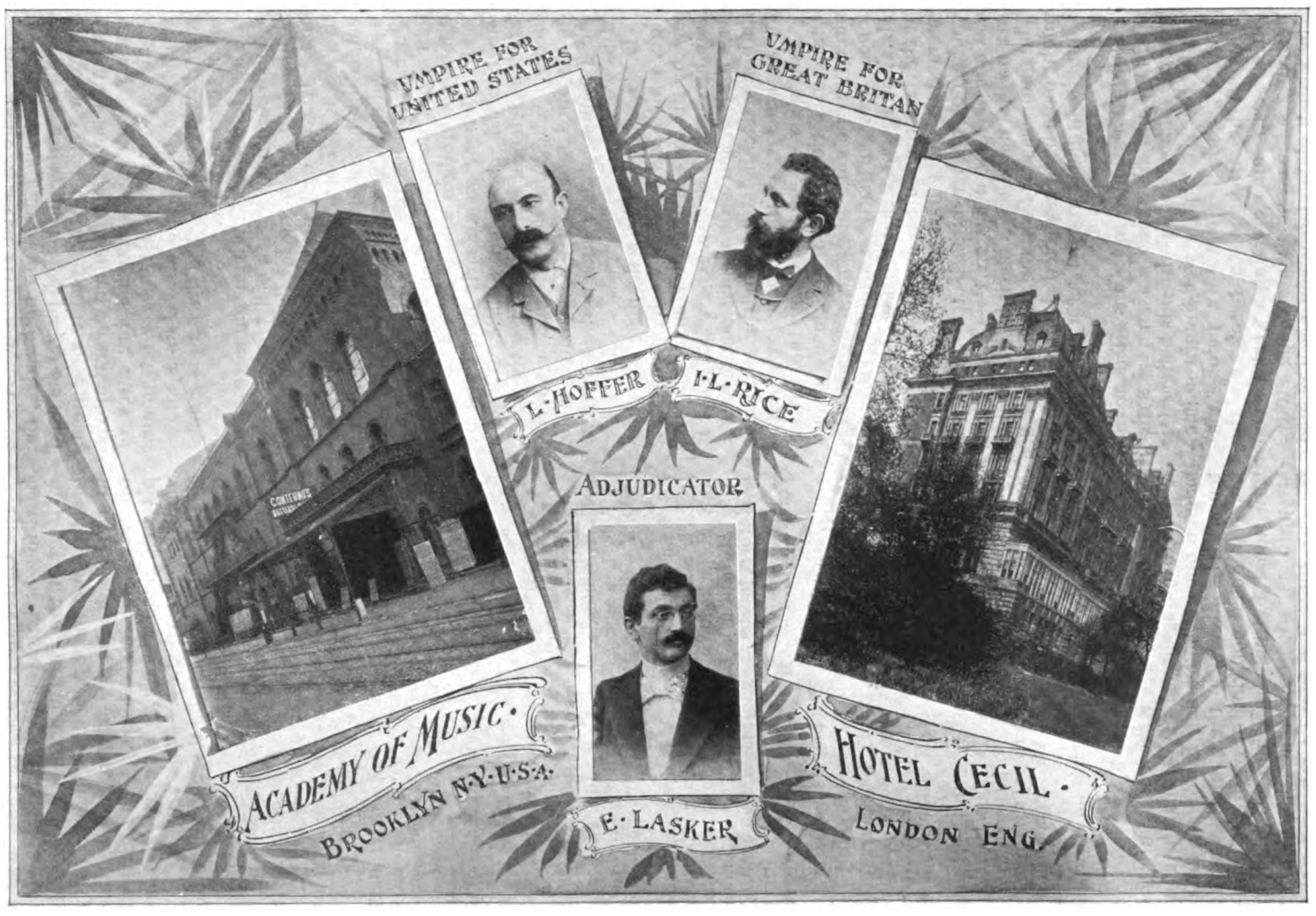
United States Team of the 1898 match (left) and setup of the match (right). Source: American Chess Magazine March 1898

The third match was held 18–19 March 1898. The United States team had white on the odd-numbered boards and the British team had white on the even-numbered boards. The British team won the match by a single game, taking the lead in the series two matches to one, and positioning themselves to end the series and take permanent possession of the Newnes cup should they win the 1899 match for three consecutive match wins. The British players were at the Grand Hall of the Hotel Cecil in London, along with Leopold Hoffer serving as the umpire for the American team. The American players were at the Academy of Music in Brooklyn, with Isaac Rice serving as umpire for the British team. World Champion Emanuel Lasker was the adjudicator, and for the third time Baron Albert von Rothschild was the referee. The moves were transmitted by the Commercial Cable Company.

Board	United States	Great Britain	Winner
1	Harry Pillsbury	Joseph Henry Blackburne	draw
2	Jackson Showalter	Amos Burn	US
3	J. F. Barry	Horatio Caro	US
4	Edward Hymes	Henry Ernest Atkins	draw
5	Albert Hodges	G. E. Bellingham	US
6	Eugene Delmar	D. Y. Mills	GB
7	David Graham Baird	C. D. Locock	draw
8	F. K. Young	E. M. Jackson	GB
9	A. K. Robinson	Herbert Jacobs	GB
10	J. A. Galbreath	Herbert William Trenchard	GB
Total	4½	5½	GB

=== 1899 match ===
The 1899 match was held 11–12 March 1899. The British team had white on odd-numbered boards and the United States team had white on even-numbered boards. The United States team won by a margin of two games, tying the series at two matches each.

Board	United States	Great Britain	Winner
1	Pillsbury	Blackburne	GB
2	Showalter	Atkins	US
3	Barry	Lawrence	US
4	Hodges	Jackson	US
5	Hymes	Mills	draw
6	Voigt	Jacobs	draw
7	Johnston	Locock	draw
8	Marshall	Wainwright	draw
9	Newman	Bellingham	draw
10	Baird	Trenchard	draw
Total	6	4	US

=== 1900 match ===
The 1900 match was held 23–24 March 1900. The United States team had white on the odd-numbered boards and the British team had white on the even-numbered boards. The United States team won by a margin of two games and they now led the British team three matches to two. The United States team was also in position to end the series and win permanent custody of the Newnes cup should they win the 1901 match.

Board	United States	Great Britain	Winner
1	Pillsbury	Blackburne	draw
2	Showalter	Lee	draw
3	Barry	Atkins	US
4	Hodges	Bellingham	US
5	Hymes	Mills	draw
6	Voigt	Lawrence	US
7	Marshall	Jackson	GB
8	Bampton	Jacobs	GB
9	Newman	Ward	draw
10	Delmar	Trenchard	US
Total	6	4	US

=== 1901 match ===
The 1901 match was held 19–20 April 1901. The British team had white on the odd-numbered boards and the United States team had white on the even-numbered boards. The match was tied at five games each. As the United States team did not win three consecutive matches, the series was not ended.

Board	United States	Great Britain	Winner
1	Pillsbury	Blackburne	US
2	Showalter	Mason	GB
3	Barry	Lee	draw
4	Hodges	Mills	draw
5	Hymes	Atkins	US
6	Voigt	Bellingham	draw
7	Marshall	Ward	GB
8	Bampton	Jackson	draw
9	Newman	Jacobs	US
10	Howell	Michell	GB
Total	5	5	draw

=== 1902 match ===
The 1902 match was held 14–15 March 1902. Harry Pillsbury and Frank Marshall were in Europe to play at Monte Carlo, so they traveled to London to play their games in person. The United States team had white on the odd-numbered boards and the British team had white on the even-numbered boards. The United States team won by a single game.

Board	United States	Great Britain	Winner
1	Pillsbury	Lawrence	draw
2	Barry	Mason	draw
3	Marshall	Atkins	GB
4	Hodges	Lee	US
5	Hymes	Mills	draw
6	Voigt	Bellingham	draw
7	Delmar	Trenchard	GB
8	Newman	Blake	draw
9	Howell	Michell	US
10	Helms	Girdlestone	US
Total	5½	4½	US

=== 1903 match ===
The 1903 match was held 3–4 April 1903. The British team had white on the odd-numbered boards and the United States team had white on the even-numbered boards. Harry Pillsbury and Frank Marshall were in Europe to play at Monte Carlo, so they traveled to London to play their games in person. The United States team won by a margin of one game. With two consecutive match wins, the United States team could take permanent possession of the Newnes cup and end the series by winning the next match.

Board	United States	Great Britain	Winner
1	Pillsbury	Lawrence	draw
2	Barry	Blackburne	US
3	Hodges	Mills	draw
4	Marshall	Atkins	US
5	Hymes	Bellingham	GB
6	Voigt	Trenchard	US
7	Newman	Michell	GB
8	Delmar	Jacobs	draw
9	Howell	Gunston	GB
10	Helms	Hooke	US
Total	5½	4½	US

=== 1904–1906 ===
No matches were held during these years due to other demand for cable traffic and technical difficulties. In 1904 the Russo-Japanese war broke out a few weeks before the planned date of the cable match, and demand for war news made the cable match impractical. In 1905, two of the transatlantic cables broke, one the night before the match was to begin. Cable companies, initially less concerned about partially absorbing the costs of transmission during the slow period at the end of a week, became more reluctant to participate with increased demand for cable traffic. The series was not reestablished until 1907.

=== 1907 match ===
The 1907 match was held 22–23 February 1907. The United States team had white on the odd-numbered boards and the British team had white on the even-numbered boards. Howell was in London, so played his game in person. The British team won by a single game.

Board	United States	Great Britain	Winner
1	Marshall	Burn	draw
2	Barry	Atkins	GB
3	Hodges	Lawrence	draw
4	Voigt	Blackburne	draw
5	Morgan	Richmond	GB
6	Fox	Lee	draw
7	Bampton	Ward	US
8	Wolbrecht	Holmes	draw
9	Howell	Michell	US
10	Robinson	Wainwright	GB
Total	4½	5½	GB

=== 1908 match ===
The 1908 match was held 13–14 March 1908. The British team had white on the odd-numbered boards and the United States team had white on the even-numbered boards. The United States team won by a margin of three games. The teams could not agree on a result for two uncompleted games (Blackburne–Hodges and Delmar–Richmond), so for the first time in the series adjudication was required.

Board	United States	Great Britain	Winner
1	Hodges	Blackburne	draw
2	Voigt	Atkins	draw
3	Helms	Lawrence	draw
4	Delmar	Richmond	draw
5	Stadelman	Wainwright	draw
6	Howell	Ward	draw
7	Schwietzer	England	US
8	Wolbrect	Michell	US
9	Libaire	Palmer	US
10	Robinson	Sergeant	draw
Total	6½	3½	US

=== 1909 match ===
The 1909 match was held 26–27 March 1909. The United States team had white on the odd-numbered boards, and the British team had white on the even-numbered boards. One unfinished game required adjudication (Mlotkowski-Sergeant). The British team won by a margin of two games.

Board	United States	Great Britain	Winner
1	Marshall	Blackburne	US
2	Barry	Lawrence	draw
3	Hodges	Ward	US
4	Voigt	Wainwright	US
5	Howell	Blake	GB
6	Helms	Michell	GB
7	Schwietzer	Wahltuch	GB
8	Stadelman	Holmes	draw
9	Mlotkowski	Sergeant	GB
10	Ruth	Jacobs	GB
Total	4	6	GB

=== 1910 match ===
The 1910 match was held 11–12 March 1910. The United States team had white on the odd-numbered boards and the British team had white on the even-numbered boards. There were three unfinished games that required adjudication (Marshall–Blackburne, Wahltuch–Voigt, and Rosenfeld–Thomas). The British team won by a margin of three games. With two consecutive match victories, the British team could end the series and take permanent possession of the Newnes cup with a win in the 1911 match. Sir George Newnes died several months after the 1910 match, so he would not see the completion of the series in 1911.

Board	United States	Great Britain	Winner
1	Marshall	Blackburne	US
2	Barry	Atkins	GB
3	Hodges	Lawrence	draw
4	Voigt	Wahltuch	GB
5	Wolbrecht	Yates	GB
6	Stadelman	Wainwright	GB
7	Schweitzer	Ward	draw
8	Black	Blake	US
9	Rosenfeld	Thomas	GB
10	Meyer	Michell	draw
Total	3½	6½	GB

=== 1911 match ===
The 1911 match was held 21–22 April 1911. The British team had white on the odd-numbered boards and the United States team had white on the even-numbered boards. Frank Marshall was in Europe to play at San Sebastián, so he traveled to London to play in person. The British team won by a margin of two games, tying both the match record (+6 -6 =1) and the individual game record (+39 +39 =50). However, by winning three consecutive matches, the British team took permanent possession of the Newnes cup and ended the series. Fox was awarded a special gold medal for the best win by a United States player.

Board	United States	Great Britain	Winner
1	Marshall	Burn	GB
2	Hodges	Atkins	draw
3	Fox	Lawrence	US
4	Barry	Wahltuch	GB
5	Voigt	Yates	GB
6	Black	Richmond	US
7	Walcott	Ward	GB
8	Milnes	Thomas	GB
9	Schwietzer	Michell	draw
10	Meyer	Cole	US
Total	4	6	GB

== Team members ==
=== British ===
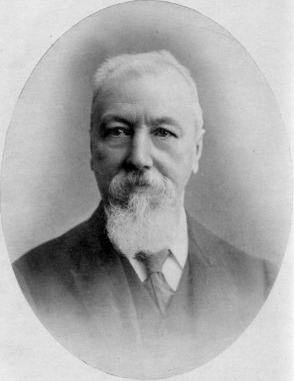
Joseph Blackburne

Matches	Player	Result	Matches	Player	Result	Matches	Player	Result
12	Henry Atkins	+4 −4 =4	4	Amos Burn	+1 −2 =1	1	Henry Bird	+0 −1 =0
11	Joseph Blackburne	+2 −4 =5	4	Francis Lee	+0 −1 =3	1	Horatio Caro	+0 −1 =0
10	Thomas Lawrence	+0 −4 =6	4	Charles Locock	+0 −1 =3	1	Harold Cole	+0 −1 =0
8	Reginald Michell	+3 −3 =2	4	George Wainwright	+2 −1 =2	1	Henry Cole	+1 −0 =0
8	Daniel Mills	+1 −0 =7	3	George Richmond	+1 −1 =1	1	P. R. England	+0 −1 =0
7	George Edward H Bellingham	+1 −2 =4	3	Victor Wahltuch	+3 −0 =0	1	T. B. Girdlestone	+0 −1 =0
7	Herbert Jacobs	+4 −1 =2	2	Harry Holmes	+0 −0 =2	1	William Gunston	+1 −0 =0
7	William Ward	+2 −2 =3	2	James Mason	+1 −0 =1	1	George Hooke	+0 −1 =0
6	Edward Jackson	+4 −1 =1	2	Edward Sergeant	+1 −0 =1	1	W. C. Palmer	+0 −1 =0
5	Herbert Trenchard	+2 −2 =1	2	George Thomas	+2 −0 =0	1	Samuel Tinsley	+0 −1 =0
4	Joseph Blake	+1 −2 =1	2	Frederick Yates	+2 −0 =0			

=== United States ===
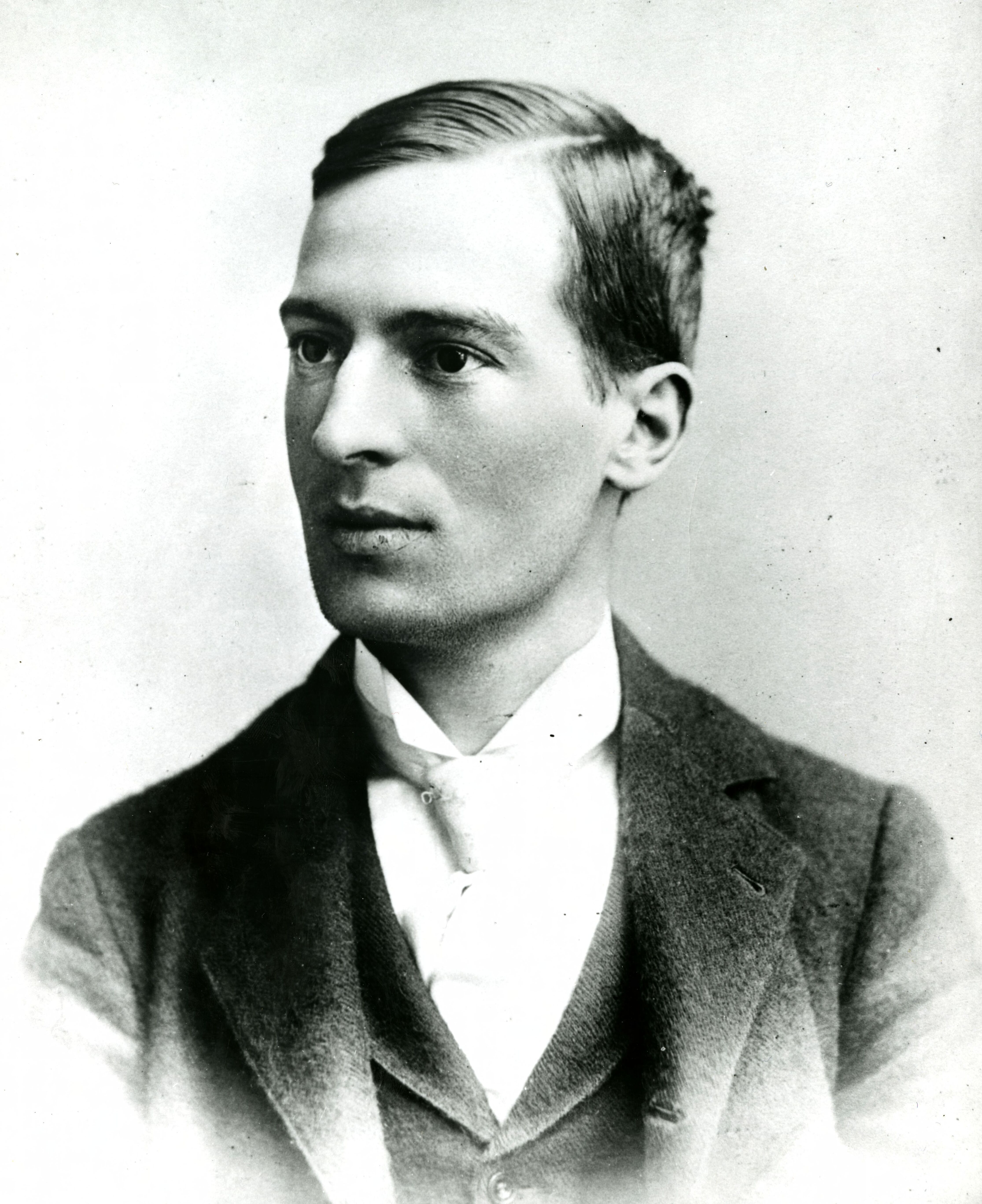
Harry Pillsbury

Matches	Player	Result	Matches	Player	Result	Matches	Player	Result
13	Albert Hodges	+5 −0 =8	4	George Schwietzer	+1 −1 =2	1	Sidney Johnston	+0 −0 =1
12	John Barry	+6 −3 =3	3	David Baird	+0 −1 =2	1	Edward Libaire	+1 −0 =0
9	Hermann Voigt	+3 −2 =5	3	Samuel Bampton	+1 −1 =1	1	John McCutcheon	+0 −1 =0
9	Frank Marshall	+3 −4 =2	3	Alfred Robinson	+0 −2 =1	1	B F Milnes	+0 −1 =0
8	Edward Hymes	+1 −1 =6	3	Samuel Stadelman	+0 −1 =2	1	Stasch Mlotkowski	+0 −1 =0
8	Harry Pillsbury	+1 −2 =5	3	George Wolbrecht	+1 −1 =1	1	Mordecai Morgan	+0 −1 =0
7	Eugene Delmar	+2 −2 =3	2	Roy Turnbull Black	+2 −0 =0	1	Herbert Rosenfeld	+0 −1 =0
6	Clarence Howell	+2 −3 =1	2	Constant Burille	+1 −1 =0	1	William Ruth	+0 −1 =0
6	Jackson Showalter	+4 −1 =1	2	Albert Fox	+1 −0 =1	1	Frank Teed	+0 −1 =0
5	Hermann Helms	+2 −2 =1	2	L. B. Meyer	+1 −0 =1	1	George Walcott	+0 −1 =0
5	Charles Newman	+1 −1 =3	1	John Galbreath	+0 −1 =0	1	Franklin Young	+0 −1 =0

== Other Anglo-American cable matches ==
Between 1899 and 1924, eleven Anglo-American university cable matches were held. As with the national teams, it was an evenly-contested series, with four wins each and three drawn matches. A special cable match between the House of Commons and the House of Representatives held in 1897 was also drawn.

== See also ==
- US vs. USSR radio chess match 1945
