= World Chess Championship 1907 =

Chess match between Emanuel Lasker and Frank Marshall

	Defending champion	Challenger
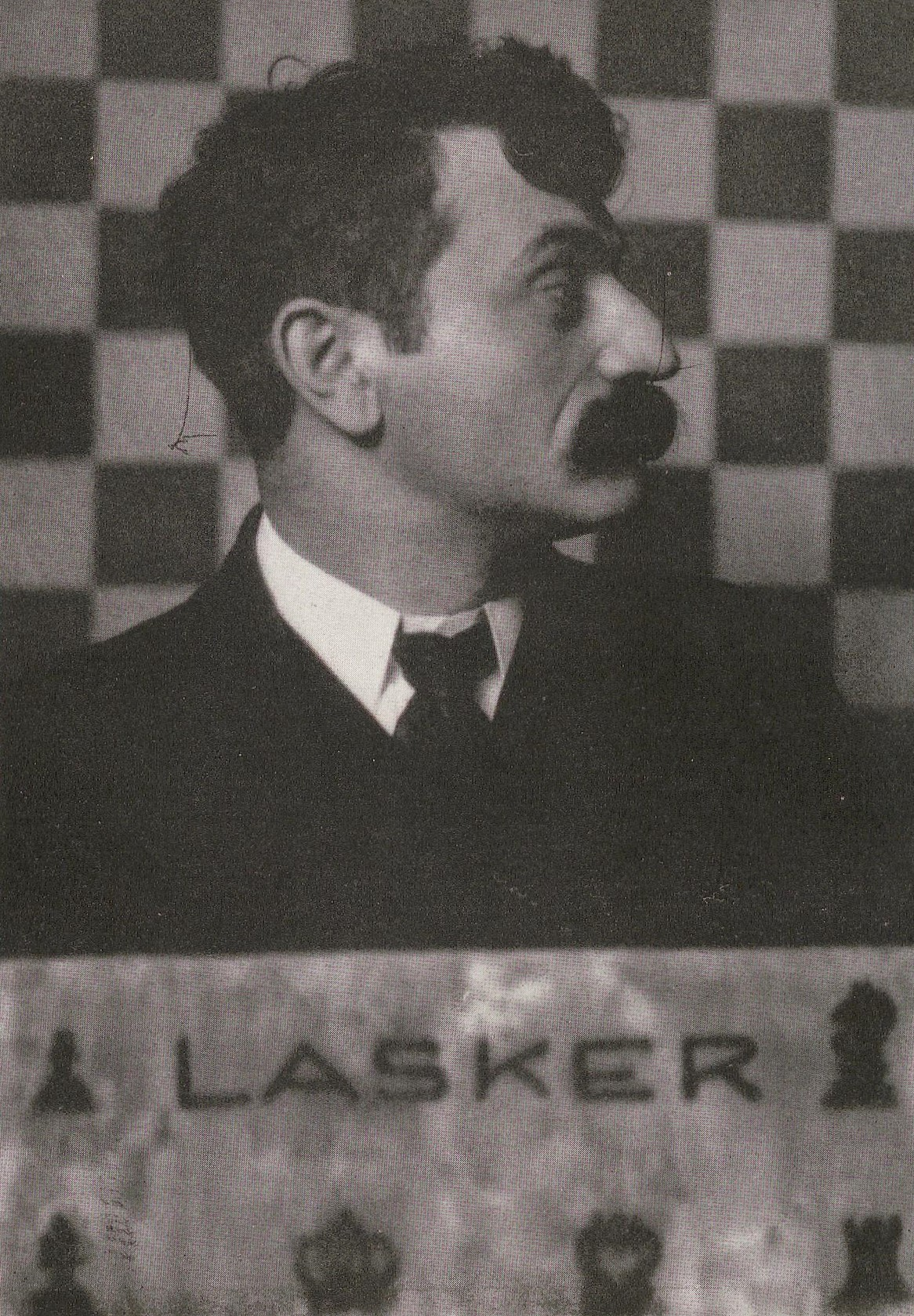
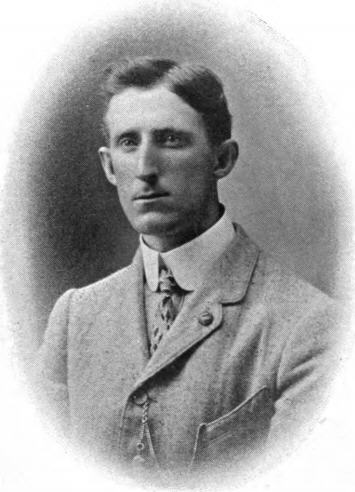
	Emanuel Lasker	Frank Marshall
	(German Empire) Emanuel Lasker	(United States) Frank J. Marshall
11½	Scores	3½
	Born 24 December 1868; 38 years old	Born 10 August 1877; 29 years old

The 1907 World Chess Championship was a chess match contested between reigning world champion Emanuel Lasker of Germany, and challenger Frank J. Marshall of the United States, for the world chess championship. It took place in six American cities from January 26 to April 6. Lasker defended his title in dominant fashion, holding Marshall winless throughout the series, while winning eight games and drawing seven.

This was the first world championship since 1897, partly because Lasker had taken a break from chess to pursue his PhD in Mathematics. He made his return to chess in the London 1899 chess tournament, and after that, several players would try to challenge Lasker to the world championship, including Dawid Janowski, Géza Maróczy, Carl Schlechter and Siegbert Tarrasch. Each bid fell apart at some stage, however, with the latter eventually playing for the world championship in 1908. Frank Marshall had come ahead of Lasker in the 1904 Cambridge Springs International Chess Congress, and the discussion of the terms of a world championship match began in 1906, with the players agreeing to reduce the number of game wins for a match victory from ten to eight, a precedent that would continue in the next world championship.

As was widely predicted, the match was a walkover for Lasker, and it was believed that Marshall wasn't his most worthy challenger. This match was seen as a side show to the next year's championship between Lasker and Tarrasch. Marshall himself summed up the match in his autobiography in one sentence, saying, "Tedious play aimed at wearing down my opponent is averse to my nature."

== Background ==
Lasker had played little chess since retaining the World Championship in 1896–1897, in part due to his doctoral studies in mathematics. However, Lasker agreed to defend his title against American challenger Frank Marshall from January 26 to April 6, 1907, in the United States, with the games being played in New York, Philadelphia, Washington, D.C., Baltimore, Chicago and Memphis.

Because Lasker had requested the significant sum of $5,000 (over $170,000 today), Marshall turned to chess associations in various cities to sponsor the game, which is what led to it being held in so many cities. On March 2, Lasker and Marshall met with then-president of the United States Theodore Roosevelt, and had their Washington game in the Northern Liberty Market.

Despite three World Championship matches in the previous 30 years having been held at least partially in the United States, this would be the last championship on American soil until 1990.

== Results ==
The first player to win eight games would be World Champion.

World Chess Championship Match 1907
	1	2	3	4	5	6	7	8	9	10	11	12	13	14	15	Wins	Total
Frank J. Marshall (United States)	0	0	0	½	½	½	½	0	½	½	½	0	0	0	0	0	3½
Emanuel Lasker (Germany)	1	1	1	½	½	½	½	1	½	½	½	1	1	1	1	8	11½

Lasker won the first three games, then scored one win and seven draws in games 4–11 before winning the last four games. Lasker retained his title.

== Games ==
=== Game 1: Marshall–Lasker, 0–1 ===
Marshall–Lasker, game 1

Position: h7 black pawn, a6 black pawn, c6 black pawn, f6 black pawn, a5 white pawn, c5 black pawn, c4 white pawn, d4 black king, e4 white pawn, g4 black bishop, h4 white pawn, b3 white pawn, d3 black pawn, g3 white pawn, d2 white knight, f2 white king

Position after 35...a6. White is now in zugzwang, as no pawn can move without being captured, the knight cannot move without abandoning the e4-pawn, and if the king tries to prevent the infiltration of the black king with Ke1, Kc3 will happen anyway as the same problem applies, except with any king move abandoning the knight and any knight move abandoning b3.

In this game, Marshall played the obscure 5.0-0!? and played into a balanced middlegame, trading queens and one pair of rooks. Lasker began to get the better of the endgame, and put White in zugzwang with 35...a6. Marshall found it impossible to save the endgame, and was unable to prevent promotion after 50...b2.

Ruy Lopez, Berlin Defense (ECO C65)
1.e4 e5 2.Nf3 Nc6 3.Bb5 Nf6 4.d4 exd4 5.0-0 Be7 6.e5 Ne4 7.Nxd4 0-0 8.Nf5 d5 9.Bxc6 bxc6 10.Nxe7+ Qxe7 11.Re1 Qh4 12.Be3 f6 13.f3 fxe5 14.fxe4 d4 15.g3 Qf6 16.Bxd4 exd4 17.Rf1 Qxf1+ 18.Qxf1 Rxf1+ 19.Kxf1 Rb8 20.b3 Rb5 21.c4 Rh5 22.Kg1 c5 23.Nd2 Kf7 24.Rf1+ Ke7 25.a3 Rh6 26.h4 Ra6 27.Ra1 Bg4 28.Kf2 Ke6 29.a4 Ke5 30.Kg2 Rf6 31.Re1 d3 32.Rf1 Kd4 33.Rxf6 gxf6 34.Kf2 c6 35.a5 a6 36.Nb1 Kxe4 37.Ke1 Be2 38.Nd2+ Ke3 39.Nb1 f5 40.Nd2 h5 41.Nb1 Kf3 42.Nc3 Kxg3 43.Na4 f4 44.Nxc5 f3 45.Ne4+ Kf4 46.Nd6 c5 47.b4 cxb4 48.c5 b3 49.Nc4 Kg3 50.Ne3 b2 0–1

=== Game 2: Lasker–Marshall, 1–0 ===
In this game, Marshall had better winning chances, but managed to lose his attacking chances after a significant piece trade, and entered a losing knight and pawn endgame, which Lasker converted.

French Defence (ECO C11)
1.e4 e6 2.d4 d5 3.Nc3 Nf6 4.Bd3 c5 5.exd5 cxd4 6.Bb5+ Bd7 7.Bxd7+ Qxd7 8.dxe6 Qxe6+ 9.Nce2 Nc6 10.Nf3 Bb4+ 11.Bd2 0-0-0 12.0-0 Rhe8 13.Nf4 Qg4 14.h3 Qf5 15.Nd3 Bxd2 16.Qxd2 Ne4 17.Qf4 Qd5 18.Qg4+ f5 19.Qxg7 Rg8 20.Qh6 Nd2 21.Qxd2 Qxf3 22.g3 h5 23.Qf4 Qd5 24.Rfe1 Rde8 25.Rxe8+ Rxe8 26.Re1 Re4 27.Qg5 Nb4 28.Rxe4 fxe4 29.Qxd5 Nxd5 30.Nc5 e3 31.Nd3 h4 32.gxh4 Kd7 33.Kf1 Ke6 34.Ke2 exf2 35.Kxf2 Kf5 36.Kf3 Nf6 37.Nc5 b6 38.Nd3 Nh5 39.Nc1 Nf6 40.Ne2 Ke5 41.Ng3 Nd5 42.h5 Ne3 43.h6 Kf6 44.c3 Nd1 45.cxd4 Nxb2 46.Nf5 Kg6 47.d5 Nc4 48.Ke4 Na5 49.d6 Nb7 50.Kd5 Nd8 51.d7 a5 52.Ne7+ 1–0

=== Game 3: Marshall–Lasker, 0–1 ===
Marshall–Lasker, game 3

Position: e8 white queen, a7 black pawn, g7 black pawn, h7 black king, b6 black pawn, h6 black pawn, f5 black rook, d4 white pawn, h4 black queen, c3 white pawn, f3 white pawn, a2 white pawn, b1 white rook, f1 white rook, h1 white king

Final position. Either king move out of check would lead to Rg5#.

Though Marshall went up the exchange at a point in this game (31.Qxc8+), Lasker seemed to be getting the better of a largely drawn position. The game seemed likely to draw until Marshall blundered checkmate in six with 42.Rf1??

Queen's Gambit Declined (ECO D53)
1.d4 d5 2.c4 e6 3.Nc3 Nf6 4.Bg5 Be7 5.e3 Ne4 6.Bxe7 Qxe7 7.Bd3 Nxc3 8.bxc3 Nd7 9.Nf3 0-0 10.0-0 Rd8 11.Qc2 Nf8 12.Ne5 c5 13.Rab1 Qc7 14.Qb3 b6 15.cxd5 exd5 16.Qa4 Bb7 17.Qd1 Rd6 18.Qg4 Re8 19.Qg3 Rde6 20.Bf5 R6e7 21.f4 Bc8 22.Bxc8 Rxc8 23.Qf3 Qd6 24.Rfc1 Rec7 25.h3 h6 26.Kh2 Nh7 27.Qh5 Nf6 28.Qf5 cxd4 29.exd4 Ne4 30.Nxf7 Rxf7 31.Qxc8+ Rf8 32.Qb7 Qxf4+ 33.Kg1 Qe3+ 34.Kh2 Qg3+ 35.Kg1 Nd2 36.Qxd5+ Kh8 37.Kh1 Nf3 38.gxf3 Qxh3+ 39.Kg1 Qg3+ 40.Kh1 Rf4 41.Qd8+ Kh7 42.Rf1 Rf5 43.Qe8 Qh4+ 0–1

=== Game 4: Lasker–Marshall, ½–½ ===
French, McCutcheon (ECO C12)
1.e4 e6 2.d4 d5 3.Nc3 Nf6 4.Bg5 Bb4 5.e5 h6 6.Bd2 Bxc3 7.bxc3 Ne4 8.Qg4 g6 9.Nf3 c5 10.dxc5 Nd7 11.Bd3 Nxd2 12.Kxd2 Nxc5 13.Rhe1 Bd7 14.Re3 Qc7 15.Rb1 0-0-0 16.Qb4 Rhf8 17.c4 Na6 18.Qc3 dxc4 19.Qxc4 Qxc4 20.Bxc4 Bc6+ 21.Ke1 Bxf3 22.Rxf3 Nc5 23.Rb5 b6 24.Rb4 Rd7 25.Be2 Kd8 26.Bb5 Rd5 27.Re3 Kc7 28.Rf4 a6 29.Bc4 Rd7 30.Be2 b5 31.Rb4 Kb6 32.a3 Rfd8 33.c4 Nd3+ 34.Bxd3 Rxd3 35.Rxd3 Rxd3 36.cxb5 axb5 37.a4 Rd5 38.f4 Ka5 39.Rxb5+ Rxb5 40.axb5 Kxb5 ½–½

=== Game 5: Marshall–Lasker, ½–½ ===
Queen's Gambit Declined (ECO D53)
1.d4 d5 2.c4 e6 3.Nc3 Nf6 4.Bg5 Be7 5.e3 Ne4 6.Bxe7 Qxe7 7.Bd3 Nxc3 8.bxc3 Nd7 9.Nf3 e5 10.dxe5 dxc4 11.Bxc4 Nxe5 12.Nxe5 Qxe5 13.Qd4 Qxd4 14.exd4 Be6 15.Bxe6 fxe6 16.0-0 0-0-0 17.Rfe1 Rd6 18.Re3 Rf8 19.Rae1 Kd7 20.Rb1 Rb6 21.Rxb6 axb6 22.Rh3 h6 23.Rg3 g5 24.h4 gxh4 25.Rg6 h5 26.Rg5 Rh8 27.a4 Ra8 28.Rxh5 Rxa4 29.Rxh4 Rc4 30.Rh3 b5 31.Rd3 b4 32.cxb4 Rxb4 33.Kf1 Rb2 34.g4 Ke7 35.Kg2 Rb4 36.Kg3 Kf6 37.f4 Rb1 38.Re3 c6 39.Kf3 Rb4 40.Rd3 Rb1 41.Re3 Rb4 ½–½

=== Game 6: Lasker–Marshall, ½–½ ===
French, McCutcheon (ECO C12)
1.e4 e6 2.d4 d5 3.Nc3 Nf6 4.Bg5 Bb4 5.exd5 Qxd5 6.Bxf6 gxf6 7.Qd2 Bxc3 8.Qxc3 Nc6 9.Nf3 Rg8 10.0-0-0 Qxa2 11.d5 exd5 12.Bb5 Kf8 13.Bxc6 bxc6 14.Qxf6 Qa1+ 15.Kd2 Qa5+ 16.c3 Rb8 17.Ng5 Rxb2+ 18.Ke1 Rxg5 19.Qd8+ Kg7 20.Qxg5+ Kf8 21.Qd8+ Kg7 ½–½

=== Game 7: Marshall–Lasker, ½–½ ===
Queen's Gambit Declined, Tarrasch (ECO D32)
1.d4 d5 2.c4 e6 3.Nc3 c5 4.cxd5 exd5 5.Nf3 Nc6 6.Bg5 Be7 7.Bxe7 Ngxe7 8.dxc5 Qa5 9.e3 Qxc5 10.Bd3 Bg4 11.0-0 Rd8 12.Re1 f5 13.h3 Bh5 14.Be2 0-0 15.Nd4 Bxe2 16.Ncxe2 Rf6 17.Qb3 Na5 18.Qd3 Nc4 19.b3 Nd6 20.Rac1 Qb6 21.Rc2 Ne4 22.Rec1 a6 23.Nf4 g5 24.Rc7 Nc6 25.Nfe6 Ne5 26.Rg7+ Kh8 27.Rcc7 Qxc7 28.Rxc7 Nxd3 29.Nxd8 Ndxf2 30.Rxb7 Nd1 31.Nf7+ Kg7 32.Nxg5+ Kg6 33.Nxh7 Rf7 34.Rxf7 Kxf7 35.Nxf5 Ndc3 36.a4 Kg6 37.Ne7+ Kxh7 38.b4 Nd6 39.Kf2 Kg7 40.Kf3 Kf6 41.Nc6 Nc4 42.b5 a5 43.b6 Nxb6 44.Nxa5 Ncxa4 45.h4 Nc5 46.g4 Nd3 47.g5+ Kf5 48.Nc6 Ne1+ 49.Kf2 ½–½

=== Game 8: Lasker–Marshall, 1–0 ===
French, McCutcheon (ECO C12)
1.e4 e6 2.d4 d5 3.Nc3 Nf6 4.Bg5 Bb4 5.exd5 Qxd5 6.Bxf6 gxf6 7.Qd2 Bxc3 8.Qxc3 Nc6 9.Nf3 Qe4+ 10.Kd2 Bd7 11.Re1 Qf4+ 12.Qe3 Qd6 13.Kc1 0-0-0 14.Rd1 Rhg8 15.g3 Nb4 16.Qa3 Bc6 17.Bg2 Be4 18.Ne1 Bxg2 19.Nxg2 Nc6 20.Qxd6 Rxd6 21.c3 e5 22.d5 Ne7 23.Ne3 c6 24.dxc6 Rxc6 25.Rhf1 Re8 26.f4 exf4 27.Rxf4 Ng6 28.Rf3 Ne5 29.Rf2 Ra6 30.a3 Rd8 31.Rxd8+ Kxd8 32.Kc2 Rd6 33.Rf5 Nd7 34.Rh5 Nf8 35.c4 Kd7 36.Kc3 Ke6 37.Nd5 a6 38.a4 Rc6 39.a5 Rd6 40.g4 Rc6 41.b3 Rd6 42.Kd4 Kd7 43.Rf5 Ne6+ 44.Ke3 Ng7 45.Nxf6+ Kc6 46.Rf2 Rd1 47.Nd5 Rb1 48.Rxf7 Rxb3+ 49.Ke4 Ne8 50.Re7 h5 51.Rxe8 hxg4 52.Ke5 Rh3 53.Rc8+ Kd7 54.Rc7+ Kd8 55.Rxb7 Rxh2 56.Kd6 Rh6+ 57.Kc5 Rg6 58.Nf4 Rf6 59.Nd5 Rg6 60.Ne7 Re6 61.Nc6+ Kc8 62.Rg7 Re4 63.Kd5 Rf4 64.Ne5 Rf1 65.Rxg4 Ra1 66.c5 Kc7 67.Rg7+ Kc8 68.Nc4 Ra2 69.Kc6 1–0

=== Game 9: Marshall–Lasker, ½–½ ===
Marshall–Lasker, game 9

Position: c6 black pawn, f6 black pawn, c5 white knight, f5 black king, g5 black pawn, a4 white pawn, c4 black bishop, f4 white bishop, h4 black pawn, f3 white pawn, g3 white pawn, g2 white king, h2 black bishop

Position after 39.Kg2??. A blunder if Black finds 39...gxf4, as now White taking Black's bishop would lead to the creation of two connected passed pawns (40.Kxh2 fxg3+ 41.Kg2 Kf4). Also 40.gxh4 loses for White, as it leads to 40...Bg3, and though White can recoup the lost piece by advancing the a-pawn and forcing the bishop to sacrifice itself to prevent its advance, Black's pawns are still too numerous. 40.g4+ would also lose, as it encourages the king to the centre to escort the c-pawn to promotion. Black missed the opportunity, however, playing 39...Bxg3? leading to an uncapitalisable pawn advantage and a draw.

Marshall made a blunder that was surprisingly missed by Lasker with 39.Kg2??. 39...gxf4 would capitalise on this, as 40.Kxh2 leads to 40...fxg3 and the creation of two connected passed pawns. 40.gxh4 also fails here to 40...Bg3.

Queen's Gambit Declined, Tarrasch (ECO D32)
1.d4 d5 2.c4 e6 3.Nc3 c5 4.cxd5 exd5 5.Nf3 cxd4 6.Qxd4 Nf6 7.e4 Nc6 8.Bb5 dxe4 9.Bxc6+ bxc6 10.Qxd8+ Kxd8 11.Ng5 Be6 12.0-0 Bb4 13.Ncxe4 Nxe4 14.Nxe4 Bd5 15.Bd2 Rb8 16.Rad1 Kc8 17.Nc3 Bc4 18.Rfe1 Rd8 19.Bf4 Rb7 20.Rxd8+ Kxd8 21.Rd1+ Rd7 22.Rxd7+ Kxd7 23.a3 Bd6 24.Be3 a6 25.Bd4 f6 26.Ne4 Bc7 27.f3 Ke6 28.Kf2 Kd5 29.Be3 Be5 30.Nc3+ Ke6 31.Na4 h5 32.b3 Bd5 33.Nc5+ Kf5 34.Nxa6 Bxb3 35.Nc5 Bc4 36.a4 Bxh2 37.g3 h4 38.Bf4 g5 39.Kg2 Bxg3 40.Bxg3 hxg3 41.Kxg3 Ke5 42.a5 f5 43.a6 Bxa6 44.Nxa6 Kd4 45.Nc7 Ke5 46.f4+ ½–½

=== Game 10: Lasker–Marshall, ½–½ ===
French, McCutcheon (ECO C12)
1.e4 e6 2.d4 d5 3.Nc3 Nf6 4.Bg5 Bb4 5.exd5 Qxd5 6.Bxf6 gxf6 7.Qd2 Bxc3 8.Qxc3 Nc6 9.Nf3 Qe4+ 10.Kd2 Bd7 11.Rd1 0-0-0 12.Kc1 e5 13.Bb5 Nxd4 14.Nxd4 exd4 15.Rxd4 Qxg2 16.Bxd7+ Rxd7 17.Rxd7 Qxh1+ 18.Rd1 Qxh2 19.Qxf6 Rf8 20.a4 a6 21.Kb1 Qh5 22.Rd3 Re8 23.Qd4 Kb8 24.Qd7 Qh1+ 25.Ka2 Qe4 26.Qxf7 Qxa4+ 27.Ra3 Qc6 28.Qxh7 Qd5+ 29.b3 Re2 30.Ra4 Rxf2 31.Qh8+ Ka7 32.Kb2 c5 33.Rc4 Rf1 34.Ka2 Rf7 35.Qc8 b6 36.Rg4 Qd7 37.Qxd7+ Rxd7 38.Rf4 b5 39.Rf6 Rd5 40.Kb2 Kb7 41.Rh6 b4 42.Rh7+ Kc6 43.Rh6+ Rd6 44.Rh8 Kb5 45.Rb8+ Rb6 46.Rc8 a5 47.c4+ bxc3+ 48.Kxc3 ½–½

=== Game 11: Marshall–Lasker, ½–½ ===
Dutch, Staunton Gambit (ECO A83)
1.d4 f5 2.e4 fxe4 3.Nc3 Nf6 4.Bg5 c6 5.f3 Qa5 6.Bxf6 exf6 7.fxe4 Bb4 8.Qf3 d5 9.Nge2 0-0 10.exd5 Qxd5 11.Qxd5+ cxd5 12.0-0-0 Rd8 13.a3 Ba5 14.h3 Nc6 15.g3 Be6 16.Bg2 Bf7 17.Rhf1 Rac8 18.Na4 Bc7 19.Nf4 b5 20.Nc3 b4 21.axb4 Nxb4 22.Nd3 a5 23.g4 Bb6 24.Nxb4 axb4 25.Na4 b3 26.c3 Ba7 27.Kd2 Bxd4 28.cxd4 Rc2+ 29.Ke3 Rxg2 30.Rf2 Rg3+ 31.Rf3 Re8+ 32.Kf2 Rxf3+ 33.Kxf3 Bg6 34.Nc5 h5 35.Ra1 hxg4+ 36.hxg4 Bc2 37.g5 Kf7 38.Ra7+ Kg6 39.gxf6 gxf6 40.Kf2 Rh8 41.Rd7 Ra8 42.Ke3 Ra2 43.Kd2 Rxb2 44.Kc3 Rb1 45.Rxd5 f5 46.Rd8 f4 47.Rf8 Bf5 48.Nxb3 f3 49.Nd2 f2 50.Rg8+ Kf7 51.Rg2 ½–½

=== Game 12: Lasker–Marshall, 1–0 ===
French (ECO C11)
1.e4 e6 2.d4 d5 3.Nc3 Nf6 4.Bd3 c5 5.Nf3 dxe4 6.Nxe4 cxd4 7.Nxf6+ gxf6 8.Nxd4 Bd7 9.Be3 Nc6 10.Be4 Qa5+ 11.c3 Rc8 12.0-0 Rg8 13.Re1 Ne5 14.Bxh7 Rh8 15.Be4 Qc7 16.Bf4 Bd6 17.Bg3 Nc4 18.Qf3 Bxg3 19.fxg3 Ne5 20.Qxf6 Rxh2 21.Bf5 Rh5 22.Rxe5 Qd8 23.Qxd8+ Kxd8 24.g4 Rg5 25.Nf3 Rg7 26.Bd3 Rxg4 27.Kf2 Ke7 28.Rae1 Rcg8 29.Bf1 Bc6 30.b3 Rh8 31.R5e3 Rhg8 32.a4 a5 33.Ne5 Rf4+ 34.Kg1 Be8 35.Nc4 b5 36.axb5 Bxb5 37.Nxa5 Bd7 38.b4 f5 39.Nb3 Rfg4 40.Nd4 f4 41.Re4 R8g6 42.c4 Kd6 43.c5+ Kd5 44.Nf3 Rf6 45.Rd4+ Kc6 46.Ne5+ 1–0

=== Game 13: Marshall–Lasker, 0–1 ===
Queen's Gambit Declined, Chigorin Defense (ECO D07)
1.d4 d5 2.c4 Nc6 3.cxd5 Qxd5 4.Nf3 Nf6 5.Nc3 Qa5 6.e3 e5 7.dxe5 Nxe5 8.Bb5+ Ned7 9.Qb3 Bb4 10.Bd2 0-0 11.Bxd7 Bxd7 12.0-0 Be6 13.Qc2 Qh5 14.Ne4 Be7 15.Ng3 Qc5 16.Bc3 Rfe8 17.Rfc1 Bd5 18.Ng5 Bc6 19.Nf5 Bf8 20.b4 Qd5 21.f3 Bd7 22.e4 Bxf5 23.exf5 h6 24.Bxf6 hxg5 25.Rd1 Qb5 26.Bxg5 Bxb4 27.Qxc7 Qxf5 28.Bh4 b6 29.Bf2 Re2 30.Rd8+ Rxd8 31.Qxd8+ Bf8 32.Qd1 Qe5 33.Bd4 Bc5 34.Bxc5 Qxc5+ 35.Kh1 Qf2 36.Qg1 Rxa2 37.Rxa2 Qxa2 38.Qd1 Qc4 39.Qd8+ Kh7 40.h4 b5 41.Qg5 b4 42.h5 b3 43.h6 gxh6 44.Qf5+ Kg8 45.Qe5 a5 46.f4 a4 47.f5 Kh7 48.f6 Kg6 49.Kh2 Qh4+ 50.Kg1 Qxf6 51.Qe4+ Qf5 52.Qb4 Kh7 53.Qb7 Qc5+ 54.Kh2 Qc4 55.Qd7 b2 56.Qf5+ Kg8 57.g4 a3 58.g5 Qh4+ 0–1

=== Game 14: Lasker–Marshall, 1–0 ===
French (ECO C11)
1.e4 e6 2.d4 d5 3.Nc3 Nf6 4.Bd3 c5 5.Nf3 c4 6.Be2 dxe4 7.Ne5 Bd6 8.0-0 a6 9.Nxc4 h6 10.f3 exf3 11.Bxf3 Bxh2+ 12.Kxh2 h5 13.Bf4 Ng4+ 14.Kg1 g5 15.Be5 Rh7 16.Bxg4 hxg4 17.Ne4 Nd7 18.Qxg4 Nxe5 19.dxe5 Kf8 20.Rad1 Qc7 21.Nf6 1–0

=== Game 15: Marshall–Lasker, 0–1 ===
Marshall–Lasker, game 15

Position: a8 black rook, g8 black king, a7 black pawn, b7 black pawn, d7 black bishop, f7 black pawn, g7 black pawn, h7 black pawn, a5 black queen, d5 white pawn, d4 white pawn, e4 black knight, b3 white queen, e3 white pawn, a2 white pawn, d2 white knight, e2 white bishop, g2 white pawn, h2 white pawn, e1 white king, h1 white rook

Marshall blundered with 20.Qd3?, allowing Lasker to take advantage with 20...Bf5 which put him the exchange up.
Queen's Gambit Declined (ECO D53)
1.d4 d5 2.c4 e6 3.Nc3 Nf6 4.Bg5 Be7 5.e3 Ne4 6.Bxe7 Qxe7 7.cxd5 Nxc3 8.bxc3 exd5 9.Qb3 c6 10.c4 0-0 11.Nf3 Qc7 12.Rc1 Qa5+ 13.Rc3 Nd7 14.Nd2 c5 15.cxd5 cxd4 16.exd4 Re8+ 17.Re3 Rxe3+ 18.fxe3 Nf6 19.Be2 Ne4 20.Qd3 Bf5 21.0-0 Ng3 22.Rxf5 Nxf5 23.e4 Ne7 24.a3 Rc8 25.d6 Ng6 26.Nc4 Qg5 27.Bf1 b5 28.Na5 Nf4 29.Qg3 Qf6 30.Qe3 Qxd6 31.Bxb5 Qb6 32.Bc4 Ne6 33.Bxe6 fxe6 34.Nb3 e5 35.Kf1 Rb8 36.Nc5 exd4 37.Qxd4 Rc8 0–1
