= London 1899 chess tournament =

Chess tournament held in Londo

The London 1899 chess tournament was a chess tournament held in London. Players of the tournament included old champion Wilhelm Steinitz and Emanuel Lasker, the latter of which won the tournament.

The organizing committee was headed by Sir George Newnes, with Herbert William Trenchard occupying the role of treasurer.

Many top players at the time were invited, with many being the champion of their country. Refusals came from Siegbert Tarrasch and Rudolf Charousek (illness), and Amos Burn had to withdraw on the opening day. Fifteen participants played double rounds from 30 May to 10 July 1899, except for Richard Teichmann. He withdrew after round 4 due to an eye infection.

Lasker finished 4½ points ahead of the group finished tied for second (Janowski, Maroczy, Pillsbury), and was one of the most dominant performances in a chess tournament at the time, and London 1899 is one of many Lasker victories along with St. Petersburg 1896, Paris 1900, St. Petersburg 1914 and New York 1924.

== The Premier tournament ==
The results and standings:

#	Player	1	2	3	4	5	6	7	8	9	10	11	12	13	14	15	Total
1	Emanuel Lasker (German Empire)	xx	½ 1	½ 1	1 ½	½ 1	0 1	1 1	1 1	1 ½	½ 1	1 ½	1 1	1 1	1 1	+ +	23½
2–4	Géza Maróczy (Austria-Hungary)	½ 0	xx	½ ½	1 0	½ ½	½ 1	0 1	½ 1	1 0	½ 1	1 1	½ 1	1 ½	1 1	+ +	19
2–4	Harry Nelson Pillsbury (United States)	½ 0	½ ½	xx	0 1	½ 1	0 0	1 0	½ ½	1 1	1 1	1 1	1 1	1 ½	1 1	½ +	19
2–4	Dawid Janowski (France)	0 ½	0 1	1 0	xx	1 1	1 ½	1 1	½ 1	0 0	1 0	1 1	1 1	0 1	1 ½	+ +	19
5	Carl Schlechter (Austria-Hungary)	½ 0	½ ½	½ 0	0 0	xx	1 ½	1 0	½ 1	½ 1	1 1	0 ½	1 1	1 1	1 1	+ +	18
6	Joseph Henry Blackburne (United Kingdom)	1 0	½ 0	1 1	0 ½	0 ½	xx	½ 0	0 1	1 ½	1 0	0 1	1 ½	1 1	1 1	½ +	16½
7	Mikhail Chigorin (Russian Empire)	0 0	1 0	0 1	0 0	0 1	½ 1	xx	1 ½	1 ½	½ 1	0 1	1 0	1 1	1 0	1 +	16
8	Jackson Whipps Showalter (United States)	0 0	½ 0	½ ½	½ 0	½ 0	1 0	0 ½	xx	0 ½	1 ½	0 ½	1 1	1 1	0 1	+ +	13½
9	James Mason (United States)	0 ½	0 1	0 0	1 1	½ 0	0 ½	0 ½	1 ½	xx	0 1	0 0	0 0	1 1	½ 1	+ +	13
10–11	Wilhelm Steinitz (United States)	½ 0	½ 0	0 0	0 1	0 0	0 1	½ 0	0 ½	1 0	xx	1 ½	½ 0	½ 1	1 1	+ +	12½
10–11	Wilhelm Cohn (German Empire)	0 ½	0 0	0 0	0 0	1 ½	1 0	1 0	1 ½	1 1	0 ½	xx	1 ½	1 0	0 0	+ +	12½
12	Francis Joseph Lee (United Kingdom)	0 0	½ 0	0 0	0 0	0 0	0 ½	0 1	0 0	1 1	½ 1	0 ½	xx	½ 1	½ ½	+ +	10½
13	Henry Edward Bird (United Kingdom)	0 0	0 ½	0 ½	1 0	0 0	0 0	0 0	0 0	0 0	½ 0	0 1	½ 0	xx	1 1	+ +	8
14	Samuel Tinsley (United Kingdom)	0 0	0 0	0 0	0 ½	0 0	0 0	0 1	1 0	½ 0	0 0	1 1	½ ½	0 0	xx	0 +	7
15	Richard Teichmann (German Empire)	-	-	½ -	-	-	½ -	0 -	-	-	-	-	-	-	1 -	xx	2

An amount of £1020 for prizes and consolation money was distributed on 11 July 1899. Lasker got £250 and a gold medal. Steinitz won no prize for the first time in his career.

== The Minor tournament ==
There was a second section in the tournament, which was won by Frank James Marshall with 8½ out of 11. Georg Marco and Jacques Mieses were the most experienced opponents. The results and standings:

#	Player	1	2	3	4	5	6	7	8	9	10	11	12	Total
1	Frank Marshall (United States)	x	½	0	1	½	1	1	½	1	1	1	1	8½
2–3	Georg Marco (Austria-Hungary)	½	x	½	½	½	1	1	1	1	½	½	1	8
2–3	Thomas Physick (United Kingdom)	1	½	x	½	½	½	½	½	1	1	1	1	8
4–5	Edward Owen Jones (United Kingdom)	0	½	½	x	1	0	1	1	1	1	½	1	7½
4–5	Jacques Mieses (German Empire)	½	½	½	0	x	0	1	1	1	1	1	1	7½
6–7	Edward Mackenzie Jackson (United Kingdom)	0	0	½	1	1	x	0	0	1	1	0	1	5½
6–7	Stephen Francis Smith (Canada)	0	0	½	0	0	1	x	0	1	1	1	1	5½
8	Oscar Conrad Müller (United Kingdom) / Germany ?	½	0	½	0	0	1	1	x	0	1	0	1	5
9–10	Vasily Tabunshchikov (Russian Empire)	0	0	0	0	0	0	0	1	x	½	1	1	3½
9–10	Johannes Esser (Netherlands)	0	½	0	½	0	1	0	1	½	x	0	0	3½
11	Henry Erskine (United Kingdom)	0	½	0	0	0	0	0	0	½	1	x	1	3
12	J. Klimsch (German Empire)	0	0	0	0	0	0	0	0	0	0	0	x	0

== See also ==
- London 1851 chess tournament
- London 1862 chess tournament
- London 1883 chess tournament
