= Herbert William Trenchard =

English chess player (1857–1934)

Herbert William Trenchard (8 September 1857, Thorncombe – 15 April 1934, London) was an English chess master.

An alumnus of London University, Trenchard was a member of the Middle Temple and was called to the bar in November 1880. Trenchard played in an 1886 match against the City of London Chess Club. The University won by 19.5-17.5. In 1890 he defeated future world champion Emanuel Lasker in a casual game at the British Chess Club.

The organizing committee for the prestigious London International Congress of 1899 was headed by Sir George Newnes, with Trenchard occupying the role of treasurer.

In tournament play, he took 11th and tied for 4-5th in London in 1886, shared twice 3rd at Cambridge 1890 and Oxford 1891, tied for 4-5th at Brighton 1892, took 2nd at London 1892 (B tourn), tied for 3rd-4th at Woolhall Spa 1893, and took 3rd at London 1896,

He also participated at Vienna 1898 (Kaiser-Jubiläumsturnier, Siegbert Tarrasch and Harry Pillsbury won) and took 19th place there.

He represented Great Britain in a series of Anglo-American cable chess matches, held between 1896-1911, for the Newnes Trophy. Trenchard took part in 1898, 1899, 1900, 1902 and 1903, scoring wins against JA Galbraith (1898) and Eugene Delmar (1902), while he shared a draw with David Graham Baird in 1899.

At the 15th City of London Chess Club Championship, which spanned 1904 and 1905, he finished 3rd, behind PS Leonhardt and FE Hamond, but ahead of EG Sergeant.

Trenchard, who managed a mineral water company in Vauxhall, was a prominent member of the National Liberal Club, where he died in 1934.
