= Albert Hodges =

American chess player (1861–1944)

Albert Beauregard Hodges
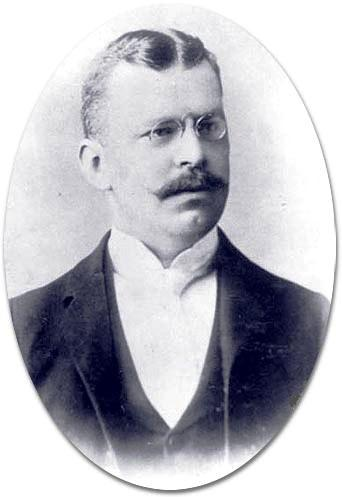
- Hodges, c. 1890
- Born: July 21, 1861; Nashville, Tennessee, United States
- Died: February 3, 1944 (aged 82); New York City
- Occupation: Chess master
- Known for: Playing inside chess automaton Ajeeb

Albert Beauregard Hodges (July 21, 1861 – February 3, 1944) was an American chess master who was born in Nashville, Tennessee.

== Chess career ==
Hodges was one of the better-known American chess masters of the late 19th century.

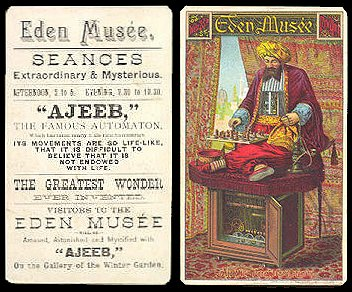
Advertisement of the display of "Ajeeb", a chess automaton

In 1894 he lost a match to Jackson Whipps Showalter (8–9), and won a rematch (5½–3½), both in New York. Hodges became U.S. Champion, but announced that his ambitions in chess had been fulfilled, and that he was retiring to pursue a career in business. In addition to his reign as U.S. Champion, Hodges main claim to fame was playing inside Ajeeb, the 19th-century chess automaton.

At the beginning of his career he lost a match to Max Judd (3–6) at St. Louis 1887, won at Chittenango 1890, shared second place, behind Hanham, at Skaneateles 1891, won a match against Eugene Delmar (5–0) at Skaneateles 1892, drew a match with Adolf Albin (4–4) at New York 1893, won at New York 1893, took second place, behind Harry Nelson Pillsbury, at New York 1893, won the New York State Chess Association Championship in 1894 ahead of J. W. Baird and Showalter, took third place at Skaneateles 1895 (Quadrangular), took second place at Thousand Islands 1897 (Pillsbury won), took third place at New York 1900 (S. Lipschütz won), and tied for 14–15th at Cambridge Springs 1904 (Frank James Marshall won).

Hodges participated in all thirteen cable matches between the US and England (1896–1903; 1907–11; matches were not held in 1904–06), scoring +5 −0 =8), and played several times for Manhattan Chess Club in friendly matches against Chicago Chess Club and Franklin Chess Club of Pennsylvania in the early 20th century.

He tied for ninth/tenth at New York 1911 (Marshall won), tied for fifth/sixth at New York 1914 (Edward Lasker won), tied for seventh/eighth at New York 1915 (José Raúl Capablanca, tied for 10–11th at New York 1916 (Capablanca won), took fourth at New York 1921 (Quadrangular), and took 11th at Lake Hopatcong 1923 (the ninth American Chess Congress, Marshall and Abraham Kupchik won).

Hodges died in New York City in 1944.

Preceded by Jackson Showalter	United States Chess Champion; 1894–1895	Succeeded by Harry Nelson Pillsbury
