= Max Judd =

American chess player

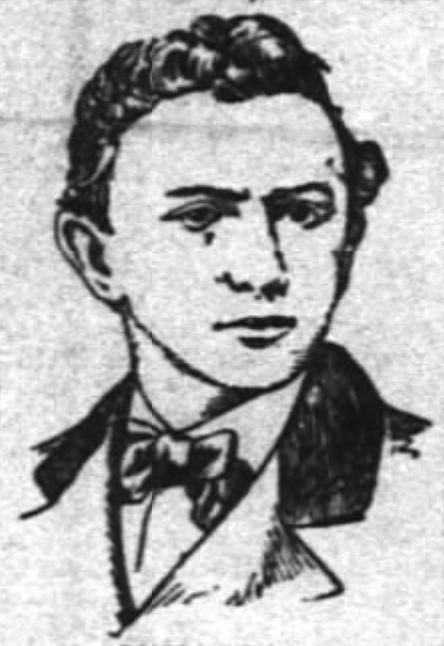

Personal information
- Born: Maksymilian Judkiewicz; December 27, 1851 Tenczynek, Austrian Empire
- Died: May 7, 1906 (aged 54) St. Louis, Missouri, U.S.

Chess career
- Country: United States

Max Judd (born Maksymilian Judkiewicz; 27 December 1851 – 7 May 1906) was an American chess player.

Born in Tenczynek, Austrian Empire, he emigrated to America in 1862. He was an American cloak manufacturer. He was founder and president of the St. Louis Chess Club. Judd was appointed by President Cleveland as the U.S. Consul General to Austria.

In 1881, he lost a chess match with George Henry Mackenzie for the U.S. Chess Championship (+5 -7 =3), held in St. Louis. In 1887 Judd defeated Albert Hodges (+5 −2 =2) in a non-title match, held in St. Louis. In 1888, Judd took last place in the 1st United States Chess Association tournament, held in Cincinnati (won by Jackson W. Showalter). In 1890, Judd defeated US chess champion Jackson Showalter in a match in St. Louis (+7 −3 =0), but did not claim the title. In 1892, Judd lost to Jackson Showalter in a match in St, Louis (+4 −7 =3). In 1899, he lost a match against Harry Nelson Pillsbury in St. Louis (+1 −4 =0). In 1903 he won the Western Chess Association Championship (U.S. Open Chess Championship) in Chicago. At one time he was offered to play in Ajeeb, the Automaton in New York, but he did not want to leave St. Louis. The job was then offered to Albert Hodges.

He played in six American Chess Congress tournaments. He took 4th place in the 2nd American Chess Congress in Cleveland in 1871 (Mackenzie won). He took 3rd place in the 3rd American Chess Congress in Chicago in 1874 (Mackenzie won). He took 2nd place in the 4th American Chess Congress in Philadelphia in 1876 (James Mason won). He took 5th place in the 5th American Chess Congress in New York in 1880 (Mackenzie won). He took 8th place in the 6th American Chess Congress in New York in 1889 (Max Weiss and Mikhail Chigorin won). He took 2nd place in the 7th American Chess Congress in St, Louis in 1904. In 1904, Judd tried to arrange the Seventh American Chess Congress in St. Louis, with the stipulation that the US title be awarded to the winner. Harry Nelson Pillsbury objected to Judd's plans, so the stipulation was not accepted. Frank James Marshall won the 7th American Congress at St. Louis 1904.

== See also ==
- List of Jewish chess players
