= Albert Fox =

American chess player

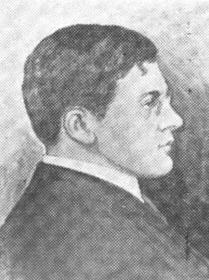
Albert Fox

Dr. Albert Whiting Fox (29 April 1881 – 29 April 1964) was an American chess master.

== Chess career ==
Born in Boston, he spent a few years in Germany, studying mathematics. By the end of his sojourn in Europe, he won several brilliant games in 1900 and 1901 at Café de la Régence in Paris, and in Antwerp and Heidelberg.

Fox returned to America in 1901. He tied for 10–11th at Cambridge Springs 1904 (won by Frank James Marshall), won Manhattan Chess Club Championship in 1905/06, tied for 2nd–3rd with Marshall, behind Eugene Delmar, at New York 1906, took 3rd at Trenton Falls 1906 (Quadrangular, Emanuel Lasker won), and tied for 7–8th at New York 1916 (Rice tournament, José Raúl Capablanca won).

He played for the Manhattan Chess Club in cable matches against Franklin Chess Club of Philadelphia, and Chicago Chess Club in 1904–1906, and twice in the Anglo-American cable chess matches between Britain and the United States (1907 and 1911).

By 1915, Fox moved to Washington D.C. to "engage in newspaper work" for the Washington Post and shortly after gave up professional chess play. Fox died in Washington, D.C..
