= Emil Kemény =

Hungarian–American chess master, editor and publisher

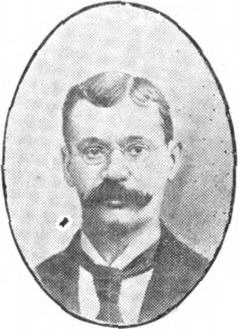
Emil Kemény

Emil Kemény (13 January 1860, Pest – 1 May 1925, Budapest) was a Hungarian–American chess master, editor and publisher.

Born in Pest (today: Budapest), Hungary, he lived for many years in New York, Philadelphia, and Chicago. During the mid-1890s, Kemeny was one of the strongest players in America. He took 2nd at Skaneateles 1891, lost a match to James Moore Hanham (4–5) at New York 1891, and won at Skaneateles 1892. He also won the 1892–93 Franklin Chess Club championship tournament, and incidentally the Championship of Philadelphia, the nation's second strongest chess metropolis, with a score of 14–4, a full point over Walter Penn Shipley. The next Franklin and city championship, that of 1893-94, however, showed Kemény crushing his opposition with a score of 23–1, a full three points ahead of Mordecai Morgan, and four and a half points ahead of Hermann G. Voigt. In 1896, he had challenged Jackson Whipps Showalter, the U.S. Champion, to a match, which Kemeny lost, with the final score of +4 –7 =4.

Between January and July 1897, he published correspondence chess games in the Philadelphia Public Ledger. In 1903 Kemeny went to Monte Carlo to report the Monte Carlo chess tournament for the North American. He published at Philadelphia for one year a weekly entitled the American Chess Weekly.

He tied for 4-5th at Philadelphia 1898, shared 1st at Philadelphia 1899-1900, took 3rd at Philadelphia 1900-1901, and took 4th at St. Louis 1904 (the 7th American Chess Congress won by Frank James Marshall).

Kemény participated in several matches (New York City CC vs. Brooklyn CC, New York State vs. Pennsylvania, Chicago CC vs. Manhattan CC, Chicago CC vs. Brooklyn CC, Chicago CC vs. Franklin CC). He returned to his native homeland in the first decade of the 20th century, where he would die in 1925 in the city of his birth.

His friend, Walter Penn Shipley, described him as "...tall, standing over six feet in height. Kemény was a genial companion with a keen sense of humor, well read, spoke several languages fluently and besides being an able chess player was passionately fond of good music."
