= Nellie Showalter =

American chess player (1870–1946)

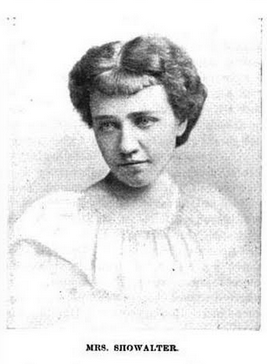
Nellie Showalter, from an 1894 publication

Nellie Love Marshall Showalter (August 19, 1870 – March 25, 1946) was an American women's chess champion, and wife of the U.S. chess champion Jackson Showalter.

== Early life ==
Nellie Love Marshall was born in Brookfield, Missouri and raised in Donerail, Fayette County, Kentucky.

== Career ==
Showalter learned to play chess in young adulthood, from her husband. In only six years, she went from a beginner who needed queen odds to one who could beat her husband at knight odds, although not with pawn and two moves. In 1894 she played the more experienced Harriet Worrall in Brooklyn, in a match billed as the "ladies' championship"; on the occasion she was quoted as saying, "I was married at 16 and now am 23, that makes seven years' playing chess with the champion chess player of the United States. It would be funny if I did not know a little, would it not?" The match was suspended when Showalter (who was winning) became ill, possibly in connection with early pregnancy. Her first child's birth also meant that, although she was one of the three American players invited, she was unable to travel to London in 1897 for a world championship of women chess players.

Showalter was a charter member of the Women's Chess Association of America when it formed in 1894. She also observed collegiate chess tournaments, reported on chess events and officiated at chess competitions.

== Personal life ==
Nellie Marshall married Jackson Showalter in 1887. They had three surviving sons (born 1895, 1904, and 1906; another infant son died in 1901) and ran a farm together in Georgetown, Kentucky. Nellie Showalter fished, hunted, and drove when such activities were considered remarkable for a woman. She was widowed in 1935, and died in 1946, aged 75 years.

Her great-granddaughter, Amy Showalter, represented the family when Jackson Showalter was inducted into the World Chess Hall of Fame in 2010.
