= Hermann Helms =

American chess player

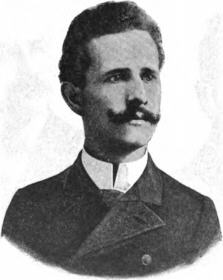
Hermann Helms

Hermann Helms (1870, New York USA – 1963, Brooklyn) was an American chess player, writer, and promoter. He is a member of the United States Chess Hall of Fame, organized as part of the World Chess Hall of Fame.

== Biography ==
=== Chess competition ===
Helms was born in Brooklyn, but spent much of his childhood in Hamburg, Germany and in Halifax, Canada, where a schoolmate taught him chess. He returned to live in Brooklyn at age 17, and settled there. His first notable chess achievement was as a member of the Brooklyn Chess Club team which won the New York Metropolitan League of 1894–95, with Harry Nelson Pillsbury as captain. As a player, Helms twice won the New York State Championship, in 1906 and 1925, and was of national Master strength, with an emphasis on sharp attacking play. During his chess career, he defeated such powers as Pillsbury and Frank Marshall. Helms also represented the United States in five cable matches against England, in the early part of the 20th century. He retired from most serious chess competition while in his forties, but remained active in blitz tournaments at the Marshall Chess Club until his late eighties.

=== Chess writing ===
Helms served as the chess reporter for The New York Times for over fifty years, until 1962. Helms founded the American Chess Bulletin in 1904, and would publish and edit this journal until his death in 1963. Helms wrote chess columns for the Brooklyn Daily Eagle newspaper from 1893 until the paper folded in 1955. Helms also wrote chess columns for the New York World for 15 years, for the New York Post for ten years, and for the New York World-Telegram for ten years.

=== Chess organization ===
Helms helped to organize two great international grandmaster events: New York 1924 chess tournament (won by Emanuel Lasker) and New York 1927 chess tournament (won by José Raúl Capablanca), which are among the most important tournaments ever staged. He edited the tournament books for those two events, which were written by Alexander Alekhine. Helms also organized and promoted national chess tours for top players such as Capablanca, Alekhine, Lasker, Géza Maróczy, and Frank Marshall.

Helms was formally recognized in 1943 by the United States Chess Federation as the 'Dean of American Chess', and held this designation until his death at age 93 in 1963. Helms was called "the most important journalist in American chess history" by Arnold Denker and Larry Parr, in their well-respected 1995 book The Bobby Fischer I Knew And Other Stories (p. 329), which is the major source for this article.

Helms assisted Bobby Fischer in 1951 with his move into organized chess, when he responded to a letter from Bobby's mother Regina Fischer, who was seeking opponents in Brooklyn for her eight-year-old son. Helms encouraged and stimulated the young Fischer, who would develop very rapidly, and become U.S. Champion by age 14 in 1957, later going on to win the World Chess Championship in 1972.

There is a small file of ten of his games at chessgames.com. This includes several wins over Frank Marshall, one of the world's top players, as well as Helms' 'Immortal Game', a well-known stunning tactical win over James Smyth in 1915.

Helms was inducted into the United States Chess Hall of Fame in 1988.
