= John Washington Baird =

American chess player (1852–1923)

Personal information
- Born: February 22, 1852
- Died: 1923 (aged 70–71)

Chess career
- Country: United States
- Title: Master

John Washington Baird (February 22, 1852 – 1923) was a minor American chess master, who played in a number of American and international chess tournaments between 1880 and 1906. He was the brother of David Graham Baird, who was also an American chess master.

A writer in the New York Times, describing the players in the Sixth American Chess Congress (1889), portrayed Baird and his brother as follows:

Of the Baird brothers, David G. is the better player by far. He plays with characteristic Scotch carefulness, for he is of Scotch descent. Of medium height, he is inclined to stoutness, and is of light complexion. His brother John W. is very thin, although he looks like his brother in the face. He was one of the slowest players in the tournament.

The date and place of Baird's death are unknown.

== Chess career ==
Baird played in a number of American and international chess tournaments between 1880 and 1906. He scored 9/13, finished tied for 4th-5th place, in the Minor Section of the Fifth American Chess Congress. He finished 4th in the Fifth Manhattan Chess Club championship (1883). Baird finished 3rd with 6.15/12 in the Eighth Manhattan Chess Club championship (1883).

At the Sixth American Chess Congress at New York 1889, a double round robin that was one of the longest tournaments in history, Baird scored 7/38, finishing 19th out of 20 players. Baird's brother David Graham Baird scored 16/38, finishing 14th; Mikhail Chigorin and Max Weiss tied for first with 29 points, edging out Isidor Gunsberg (28.5).

Baird played in the 1892 Hauptturnier in Dresden, scoring 4/6 (2nd-3rd place of 7 players) and qualifying for the final, where he scored 4/8, finishing tied 4th-6th of 9 players. At a strong tournament at New York 1893, Baird finished with 4.5/9 (a half point more than his brother), tying for 5th-6th. Harry Nelson Pillsbury won with 7/9.) Baird played in the very strong Meisterturnier (Master Tournament) at Leipzig 1894, scoring a respectable 7.5/17 (12th place out of 18 players); Siegbert Tarrasch won. Baird also competed in international tournaments at Barmen 1905 and Nuremberg 1906.
