= Clarence Howell =

American chess player

Clarence Seaman Howell (2 April 1881, New York City – 27 October 1936) was an American chess master.

He took 4th at Buffalo 1901 (Harry Pillsbury won), and played in several cable matches USA vs. England (1901, 1902, 1903, 1907, 1908) and Brooklyn CC vs. Chicago CC (1905) and vs. Rice CC (1909). He won at Trenton Falls 1908 (quadrangular), won the New York State Chess Championship in 1909, and won ahead of Juan Corzo at Havana 1917 (triangular).

His name is attached to the Howell Attack in the Ruy Lopez, Open (1. e4 e5 2. Nf3 Nc6 3. Bb5 a6 4. Ba4 Nf6 5. O-O Nxe4 6. d4 b5 7. Bb3 d5 8. dxe5 Be6 9. Qe2).
