= David Graham Baird =

American chess player (1854–1913)

David Graham Baird (3 December 1854 in New York City – 8 October 1913 in Elizabeth, New Jersey) was an American chess master. He was the brother of John Washington Baird, who was also an American chess master. A writer in the New York Times, describing the players in the Sixth American Chess Congress (1889), portrayed Baird and his brother as follows:

Of the Baird brothers, David G. is the better player by far. He plays with characteristic Scotch carefulness, for he is of Scotch descent. Of medium height, he is inclined to stoutness, and is of light complexion. His brother John W. is very thin, although he looks like his brother in the face. He was one of the slowest players in the tournament.

Baird lived in New York, and played in many tournaments there. He won the Manhattan Chess Club Championship four times (1888, 1890, 1891, and 1895). He also tied for 2nd-4th in 1880, took 2nd in 1883, took 3rd in 1884, took 5th in 1885, took 10th in 1886, took 14th in 1889 (the sixth American Chess Congress, Max Weiss and Mikhail Chigorin won), took 7th in 1893 (Harry Pillsbury won), tied for 10-11th in 1894, took 5th in 1900, tied for 7-8th in 1905, and tied for 11-12th in 1911.

D.G. Baird participated at Vienna 1898 (Kaiser-Jubiläumsturnier, Siegbert Tarrasch and Pillsbury won) and took 18th place there.
