= Samuel Tinsley =

English chess player and writer

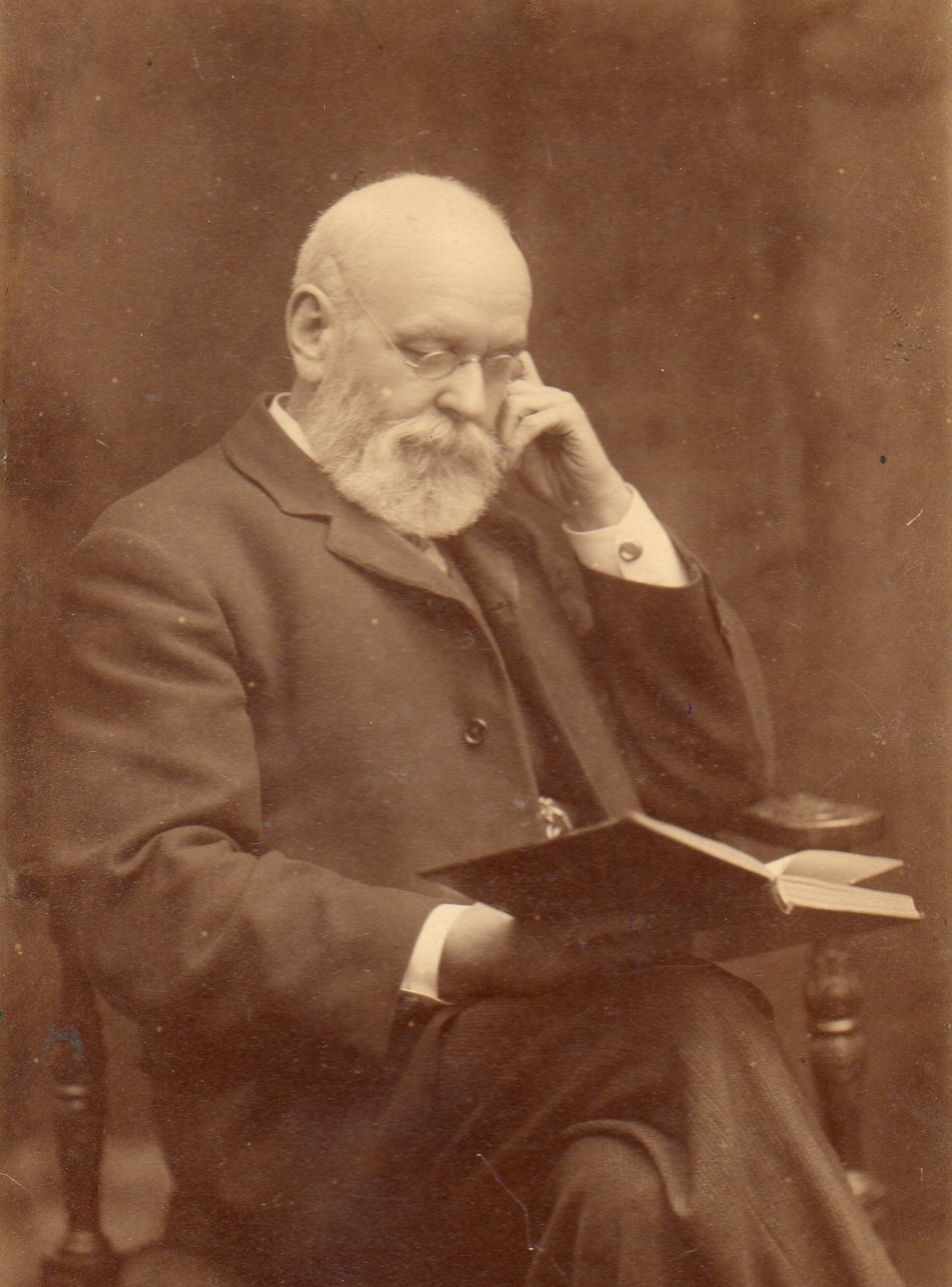
Samuel Tinsley (c. 1900)

Samuel Tinsley (13 January 1847 – 26 February 1903) was an English chess player and writer.

Tinsley was born in South Mimms, Middlesex to Sarah (née Dover) and William Tinsley. He was the seventh of ten children, and a younger sibling of publisher William Tinsley. As a young adult, Tinsley moved to London and eventually worked with several of his brothers as a publisher.

== Chess career ==
Unlike most masters, Tinsley did not take up chess until late in life, beginning to play the game seriously well into his forties. His most notable achievements include sharing seventh prize at Manchester, 1890 with Simon Alapin and Theodor von Scheve. He played in the celebrated Hastings 1895 tournament, one of the strongest tournaments held up until that date, but finished 20th–21st out of 22 players.

Tinsley was the chess columnist for The Times, and after he died his three sons took on that work. In 1912 his son Edward (1869–1937) took sole charge.

== Family and death ==
Tinsley married Sarah Ann Luetchford in 1875. Sarah had several children and the family resided in London. Tinsley died suddenly while attending a church service on 26 February 1903 (aged 56). He was buried on 4 March at Brockley and Ladywell Cemeteries, Lewisham.
