= Jackson Showalter =

American chess champion (1859–1935)

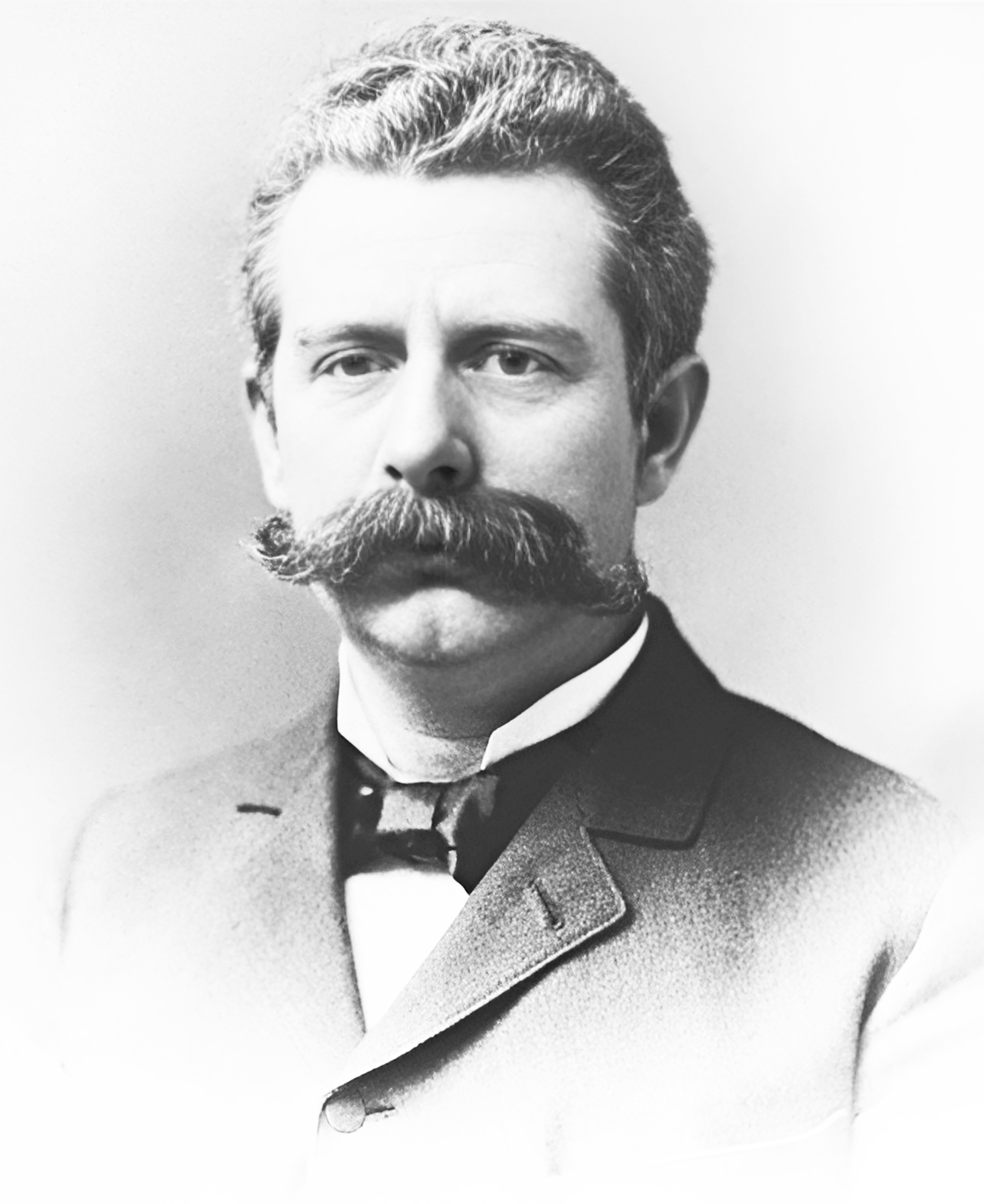

Personal information
- Born: February 5, 1859 Minerva, Kentucky
- Died: February 5, 1935 (aged 76) Georgetown, Kentucky

Chess career
- Country: United States

Jackson Whipps Showalter (February 5, 1859 in Minerva, Kentucky – February 5, 1935 in Georgetown, Kentucky) was a four-time U.S. Chess Champion: 1892, 1894, 1895-1896 and 1906–1909.

== Chess career ==
=== U.S. Championship matches ===
Showalter won U.S. Championship matches against Max Judd (1891/92, +7−4=3), Albert Hodges (1894, +7−6=4), Samuel Lipschutz (1895, +7−4=3), Emil Kemény (1896, +7−4=4), and John Finan Barry (1896, +7−2=4). He lost championship matches to Samuel Lipschutz (1892, +1−7=7), Albert Hodges (1894, +3−5=1), Harry Nelson Pillsbury (twice, 1897 (+8−10=3) and 1898 (+3−7=2), and Frank Marshall (1909, +2−7=3).

=== Other matches ===
Other match results: Max Judd (1890, +3−7=0), William H.K. Pollock (1891, +3−2=3), Emanuel Lasker (1892/93, +2−6=2), Jacob Halpern (1893, +5−3=1), Adolf Albin (1894, +10−7=8), David Janowski (four times: 1898, +2−7=4; 1899, +4−2=0 and +4−2=1; 1916, +2−7=2), Boris Kostić (1915, +2−7=5), and Norman T. Whitaker (twice: 1916, +6−1=0 and 1918, +1−4=3).

=== Tournament record ===
- New York CC championship 1887, +7-3=2, third place (Eugene Delmar won);
- Cincinnati 1888, +8−0=2, first;
- New York 1889, +15−17=8, ninth (Chigorin and Weiss won);
- St. Louis 1890, +11−0=1, first;
- Chicago 1890, +13−1=0, first;
- Lexington 1891, +5−1=0, first;
- New York 1893 (Impromptu), +7−4=2, third (Em. Lasker won);
- New York 1893 (N.Y.C.C.), +5−3=1, third (Pillsbury won);
- New York (NYSCA) 1894, +3−0=1, second (Hodges won);
- Buffalo 1894, +3−1=2, first;
- New York 1894 (2nd City Chess Club Tournament), +5−3=2, third (Steinitz won);
- New York (NYSCA) 1895, +3−0=1 (second, D. G. Baird won);
- Brooklyn CC championship 1895/96, +3−1=0, withdrew after four rounds (Hermann Helms won);
- Nuremberg 1896, +3−10=5, sixteenth (Em. Lasker won);
- New York (NYSCA) 1898, +1−1=1, seventh (Koehler won);
- Vienna 1898, +12−16=6, fourteenth (Tarrasch won);
- Cologne 1898, +8−5=2, sixth (Burn won);
- London 1899, +7−10=9, eighth (Em. Lasker won);
- Paris 1900, +8−6=5, tenth (Em. Lasker won);
- Munich 1900, +7−7=1, seventh (Pillsbury and Schlechter won);
- New York 1900, +6−2=2, second (Lipschutz won);
- Cambridge Springs 1904, +4−2=9, fifth (Marshall won);
- Excelsior (Minnesota) 1915, +9−1=0, first;
- Tampa 1916, +3−4=2, second (Moorman won);
- Chicago 1916, +14−1=2, second (Ed. Lasker won);
- Lexington 1917, +4−3=1, second (Ed. Lasker won);
- Chicago 1918 +4−6=1, ninth (Kostic won);
- Cincinnati 1919, +6−3=1, fourth (Ed. Lasker won);
- Louisville 1922, +7−2=2, fourth (Factor won);
- Chicago 1926, +2−8=2, twelfth (Marshall won).

He also competed in the Anglo-American cable matches against Great Britain from 1896 to 1901, compiling a +4−1=1 record.

== Assessment ==
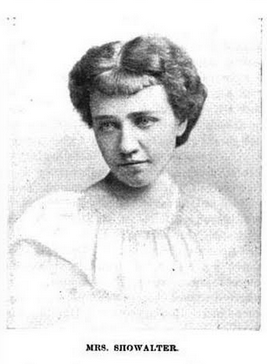
Nellie Showalter, from an 1894 publication

Showalter was known as "the Kentucky Lion" after his birthplace and his hairstyle, which consisted of a thick mane down the back of his neck, and perhaps also his playing strength. His wife Nellie was one of America's leading female players, who won a match against Emanuel Lasker at knight odds 5–2.

A variation of the Queen's Gambit Accepted is named after him (1.d4 d5 2.c4 dxc4 3.Nf3 Nf6 4.Nc3).

The famous "Capablanca Simplifying Maneuver" in the Orthodox Variation of the Queen's Gambit Declined (1.d4 d5 2.c4 e6 3.Nc3 Nf6 4.Bg5 Be7 5.e3 Nbd7 6.Nf3 0-0 7.Rc1 c6 8.Bd3 dxc4 9.Bxc4 Nd5) had in fact been used by Showalter in the 1890s, many years before José Raúl Capablanca played it.

Showalter was inducted in the World Chess Hall of Fame on August 7, 2010. His great-granddaughter, Amy Showalter, attended the ceremony and accepted the plaque on behalf of the Showalter family. The content of the induction speech was supplied by Kevin Marchese of Columbus, Ohio, who recently completed a comprehensive biography on Showalter which was published by Russell Enterprises Inc. It is currently on pre-order for a November 10, 2026 release.

Preceded by S. Lipschütz	United States Chess Champion; 1890	Succeeded by Max Judd
Preceded by Max Judd	United States Chess Champion; 1892	Succeeded by S. Lipschütz
Preceded by S. Lipschütz	United States Chess Champion; 1892–1894	Succeeded by Albert Hodges
Preceded by Albert Hodges	United States Chess Champion; 1895–1896	Succeeded by Harry Nelson Pillsbury
Preceded by Harry Nelson Pillsbury	United States Chess Champion; 1906–1909	Succeeded by Frank Marshall
