= Eugene Delmar =

American chess player

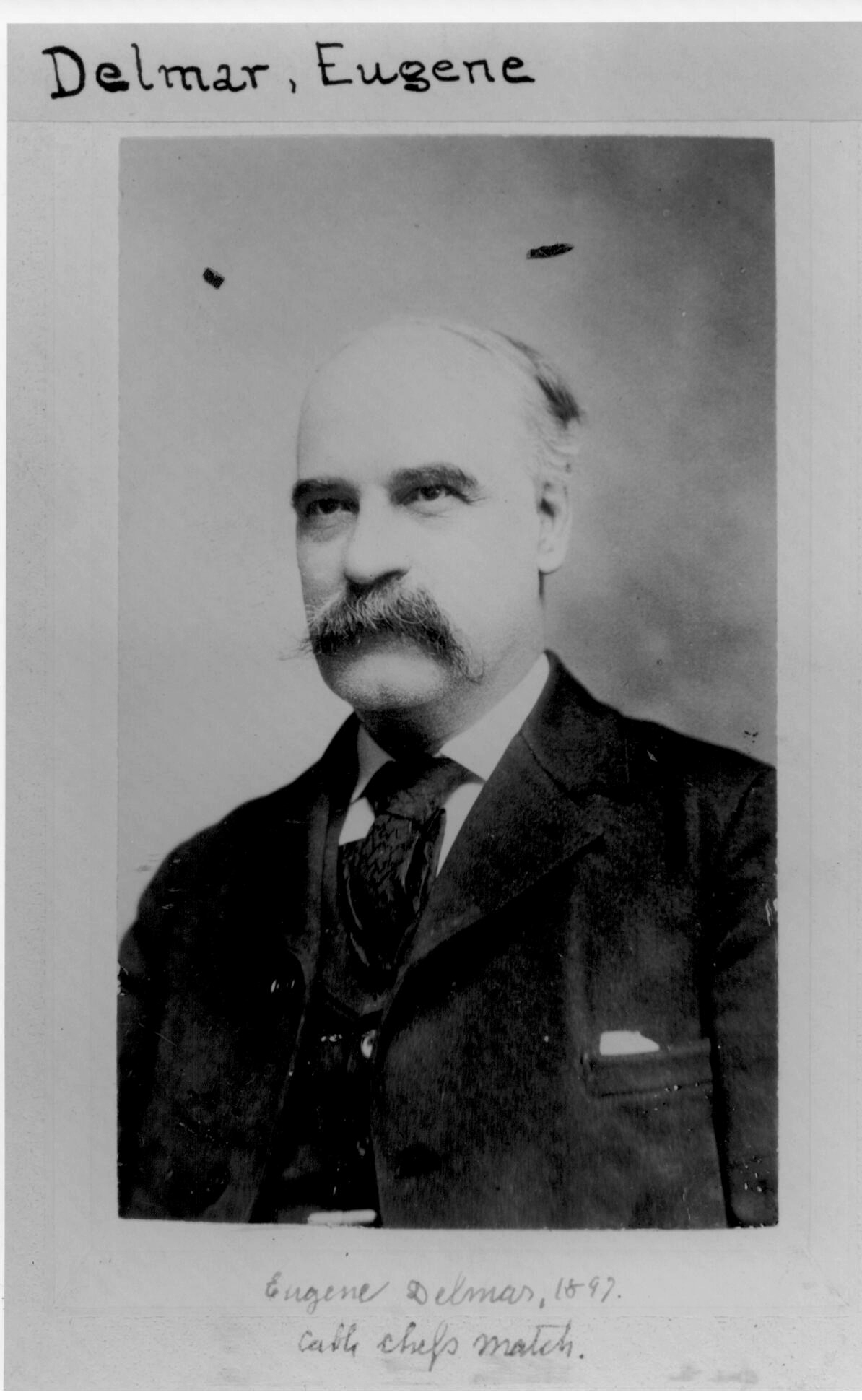
Delmar in 1897

Eugene Delmar (September 12, 1841, New York – February 22, 1909, New York), was one of the leading United States chess masters of the 19th century and the four-time New York State champion in 1890, 1891, 1895 and 1897. He won a match against Robert Henry Barnes with only a single draw (+7 –0 =1).
