= Frank Marshall (chess player) =

American chess player (1877–1944)

Personal information
- Born: Frank James Marshall; August 10, 1877 New York City, U.S.
- Died: November 9, 1944 (aged 67) New Jersey, U.S.

Chess career
- Country: United States

Frank James Marshall (August 10, 1877 – November 9, 1944) was the U.S. Chess Champion from 1909 to 1936, and one of the world's strongest chess players in the early part of the 20th century.

== Chess career ==
Marshall was born in New York City, and lived in Montreal, Canada, from age 8 to 19. He began playing chess at the age of 10, and by 1890 (aged 13) was one of the leading players in Montreal.

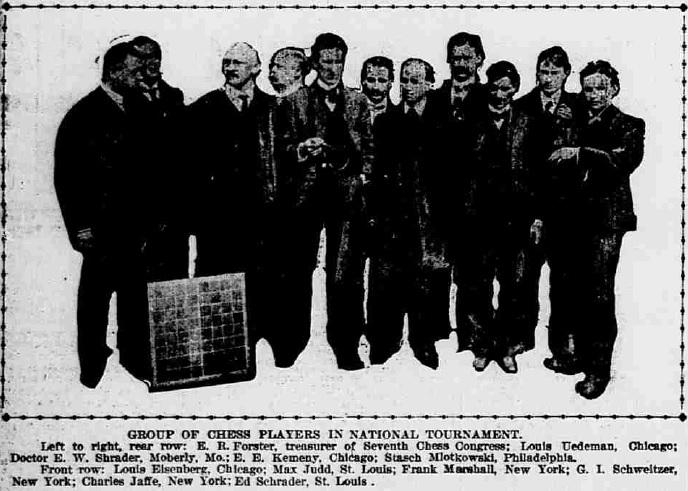
Marshall (fifth from left) at the St. Louis tournament (1904), which he won

He won the 1904 Cambridge Springs International Chess Congress (scoring 13/15, ahead of World Champion Emanuel Lasker) and the U.S. Congress in 1904, but did not get the national title because the U.S. champion at that time, Harry Nelson Pillsbury, did not compete. In 1906 Pillsbury died and Marshall again refused the championship title until he won it in competition in 1909.

In 1907 he played a match against World Champion Emanuel Lasker for the title and lost eight games, winning none and drawing seven. They played their match in New York City, Philadelphia, Washington, D.C., Baltimore, Chicago, and Memphis from January 26 to April 8, 1907.

In 1909, he agreed to play a match with then young Cuban chess player José Capablanca and, to most people's surprise, lost eight games, drew fourteen, and won only one. After this defeat, Marshall did not resent Capablanca; instead, he realized the young man had immense talent and deserved recognition. The American champion worked hard to ensure Capablanca had the chance to play at the highest levels of competition. Marshall insisted that Capablanca be permitted to enter the San Sebastián tournament in 1911, an exclusive championship promising to be one of the strongest yet in history. Despite much protest at his inclusion, Capablanca won the tournament.

Marshall finished fifth at the St. Petersburg tournament in 1914, behind World Champion Lasker, future World Champions Capablanca and Alekhine, and former World Championship challenger Tarrasch, but ahead of the players who did not qualify for the final: Ossip Bernstein, Rubinstein, Nimzowitsch, Blackburne, Janowski, and Gunsberg. According to Marshall's 1942 autobiography, which was reportedly ghostwritten by Fred Reinfeld, Tsar Nicholas II conferred the title of "Grandmaster" on Marshall and the other four finalists. Chess historian Edward Winter has questioned this, stating that the earliest known sources that support this story are Marshall's autobiography and an article by Robert Lewis Taylor in the June 15, 1940, issue of The New Yorker.

In 1915, Marshall opened the Marshall Chess Club in New York City. In 1925 Marshall appeared in the short Soviet film Chess Fever in a cameo appearance along with Capablanca.

In 1920, he won the American Chess Congress.

In 1922, Marshall played 155 games simultaneously at the National Club in Montreal, Canada, a world record. He scored 126 wins, 21 draws, and 8 losses in just over 7 hours. One week later, when Marshall returned to New York, he replayed every single move of each game, and was able to remember 154 of the 155 games. In 1924 Marshall played in the strongest tournament ever held up to that date in New York city and finished 4th after Lasker, Capablanca, and Alekhine.

In the 1930s, Marshall captained the U.S. team to four gold medals at four Chess Olympiads. During one round, he returned to the board and found that his teammates had agreed to three draws. After he finished his own game, he gave each of them a stern talk individually on how draws do not win matches.

In 1936, after holding the U.S. championship title for 27 years, he relinquished it to the winner of a championship tournament. The first such tournament was sponsored by the National Chess Federation and held in New York. The Marshall Chess Club donated the trophy, and the first winner was Samuel Reshevsky.

Marshall died in November 1944, after collapsing during a walk in Jersey City.

== Assessment ==
Marshall was best known for his great tactical skill. One aspect of this was the "Marshall swindle", where a trick would turn a lost game around. Andrew Soltis writes that, "In later years his prowess at rescuing the irretrievable took on magical proportions". Not so well known now, but appreciated in his day, was his endgame skill.

== Opening theory ==
Frank Marshall has a number of chess opening variations named after him. Two gambit variations that are still theoretically important today are named after him. One is the Marshall Attack in the Ruy Lopez (1.e4 e5 2.Nf3 Nc6 3.Bb5 a6 4.Ba4 Nf6 5.0-0 Be7 6.Re1 b5 7.Bb3 0-0 8.c3 d5). Marshall's first well-known game with this opening was against José Capablanca in 1918, although Marshall had previously played it in other games that did not gain widespread attention. Even though Capablanca won in a game widely regarded as a typical example of his defensive genius, Marshall's opening idea became quite popular. Black gets good attacking chances and scores close to 50 percent with the Marshall, an excellent result for Black. The Marshall Attack is so respected that many top players often choose to avoid it with "Anti-Marshall" variations such as 8.a4.

During his early career, Marshall was primarily known as a colorful tactical player in the Morphy tradition. When playing the White pieces, he normally used e4 openings such as King's Gambit and Vienna Game. As Black, he favored the Albin Countergambit as an answer to the Queen's Gambit. By the 1920s, most elite chess players had switched entirely to d4 openings and a more positional style of play, and Marshall changed his playing style to adapt to the times. In his later years, he often used the Caro–Kann Defense and Indian Defenses.

An important gambit in the Semi-Slav Defense is also named after Marshall. That Marshall Gambit begins 1.d4 d5 2.c4 c6 3.Nc3 e6 4.e4!? The main line runs 4...dxe4 5.Nxe4 Bb4+ 6.Bd2 (6.Nc3 saves the pawn but is not considered dangerous) Qxd4 7.Bxb4 Qxe4+ 8.Be2 with sharp and unclear play.

Another opening named after Marshall is the Marshall Defense to the Queen's Gambit (1.d4 d5 2.c4 Nf6). It is generally considered inferior to the Queen's Gambit Declined (2...e6), Slav Defense (2...c6), and Queen's Gambit Accepted (2...dxc4).

== Books ==
- Frank Marshall, My Fifty Years of Chess, 1942, ISBN 1-84382-053-6 (2002 Hardinge Simpole edition), also published as Marshall's Best Games of Chess, ISBN 0-486-20604-1 (1960 Dover Publications). This was republished in 2003: ISBN 978-1447472513 (Buchanan Press {January 9, 2013})
- Andy Soltis, Frank Marshall, United States Chess Champion: A Biography With 220 Games, 1994, ISBN 0-89950-887-1.
- Frank James Marshall, Marshall's Chess "Swindles", 1914, (American Chess Bulletin publication, 130pp.)
- John S. Hilbert, Young Marshall : The Early Chess Career of Frank James Marshall, with Collected Games, 1893-1900, 2002, ISBN 978-8071894384 (Moravian Chess Publishing, 282pp.)

== Quotes ==
- "The hardest thing in chess is to win a won game."

== Notable games ==
=== Marshall's famous 23...Qg3 ===
Levitsky vs. Marshall, Breslau 1912

Position: g1 white king, f1 white rook, h2 white pawn, g2 white pawn, f2 white pawn, c2 white pawn, a2 white pawn, h3 black rook, c3 black queen, d4 black knight, g5 white queen, c5 white rook, e6 black pawn, h7 black pawn, g7 black pawn, b7 black pawn, a7 black pawn, g8 black king, f8 black rook

Position after 23.Rc5

In his famous game against Stepan Levitsky, Marshall concluded with a sham sacrifice of his queen, allowing it to be captured three different ways, all of which would lead to imminent checkmate or an endgame with a losing disadvantage for white.

Levitsky vs. Marshall, Breslau 1912: 1.d4 e6 2.e4 d5 3.Nc3 c5 4.Nf3 Nc6 5.exd5 exd5 6.Be2 Nf6 7.0-0 Be7 8.Bg5 0-0 9.dxc5 Be6 10.Nd4 Bxc5 11.Nxe6 fxe6 12.Bg4 Qd6 13.Bh3 Rae8 14.Qd2 Bb4 15.Bxf6 Rxf6 16.Rad1 Qc5 17.Qe2 Bxc3 18.bxc3 Qxc3 19.Rxd5 Nd4 20.Qh5 Ref8 21.Re5 Rh6 22.Qg5 Rxh3 23.Rc5 (see diagram) Qg3!! (This move is considered one of the most brilliant moves ever played; Tim Krabbé ranked it third. Legend has it that the spectators showered the board with gold pieces after Marshall's last move. Chess historian Edward Winter discusses the differing accounts here.) 0–1

=== Win over Capablanca with black ===
Although Marshall lost to Capablanca far more often than he won (+2−20=28), they had many draws and Marshall was one of only a few players ever to beat Capablanca with the black pieces.

Capablanca vs. Marshall, Havana 1913: 1.e4 e5 2.Nf3 Nf6 3.Nxe5 d6 4.Nf3 Nxe4 5.d4 d5 6.Bd3 Bg4 7.0-0 Nc6 8.c3 Be7 9.Nbd2 Nxd2 10.Bxd2 0-0 11.h3 Bh5 12.Re1 Qd7 13.Bb5 Bd6 14.Ne5 Bxe5 15.Qxh5 Bf6 16.Bf4 Rae8 17.Re3 Rxe3 18.fxe3 a6 19.Ba4 b5 20.Bc2 g6 21.Qf3 Bg7 22.Bb3 Ne7 23.e4 dxe4 24.Qxe4 c6 25.Re1 Nd5 26.Bxd5 cxd5 27.Qe7 Qc8 28.Bd6 h6 29.Rf1 f6 30.Re1 Rd8 31.Bc5 Kh7 32.Qf7 Qf5 33.Be7 Qd7 34.Kf1 Rf8 35.Qe6 Qxe6 36.Rxe6 Re8 37.Re2 Kg8 38.b3 Kf7 39.Bc5 Rxe2 40.Kxe2 f5 41.Kd3 Ke6 42.c4 bxc4+ 43.bxc4 g5 44.g4 f4 45.Bb4 Bf6 46.Bf8 dxc4+ 47.Kxc4 f3 48.d5+ Ke5 49.Kd3 Kf4 50.Bd6+ Be5 51.Bc5 Kg3 52.Ke4 Bf4 53.d6 f2 0–1

Capablanca rarely lost in the endgame.

| Preceded by Jackson Showalter | United States Chess Champion; 1909–1935 | Succeeded by Samuel Reshevsky |
