= George H. D. Gossip =

American-British chess player (1841–1907)

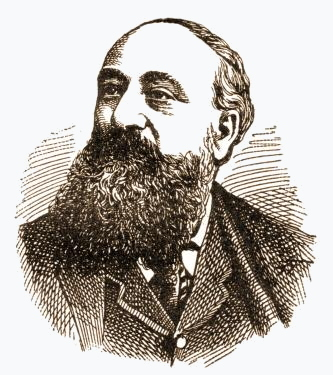
- George H. D. Gossip

Personal information
- Born: George Hatfeild Dingley Gossip; December 6, 1841 New York City, US
- Died: May 11, 1907 (aged 65) Liphook, Hampshire, England

Chess career
- Country: United States; England

George Hatfield Dingley Gossip (December 6, 1841 – May 11, 1907) was an American-English chess master and writer. He competed in chess tournaments between 1870 and 1895, playing against most of the world's leading players, but with only modest success. The writer G. H. Diggle calls him "the King of Wooden Spoonists" because he usually finished last in strong tournaments.

Gossip was also a noted writer. His treatise The Chess-Player's Manual—A Complete Guide to Chess, a 900-page tome published in 1874 after several years of work, was harshly received by the critics, largely because he had included a number of informal skittles games that he had (atypically) won against stronger players. As a result, Gossip developed a lifelong enmity toward chess critics, whom he often attacked ferociously in his books. However, his 1879 book Theory of the Chess Openings was well received. Wilhelm Steinitz, the first World Chess Champion, wrote that the 1888 edition of The Chess-Player's Manual was one of the best available books on the game. Thanks in part to a 122-page appendix by S. Lipschütz, it became one of the standard opening works of the time.

Gossip made his living primarily as a journalist, author, and translator. He wrote for publications in England, France, Australia, and the United States. At various times he resided in each of those countries, as well as in Germany and Canada. In 1898 and 1899, two publishers issued Gossip's sole book about a subject other than chess, The Jew of Chamant. Published under the pseudonym "Ivan Trepoff", it was virulently antisemitic.

Chess writers have often mocked Gossip's play, calling him a "grandpatzer" and the like. However, Kenneth Whyld, one of his previous critics, suggests that history may have judged his strength unfairly.

== Early life and education ==
George Hatfield Dingley Gossip was born in New York City on December 6, 1841, to George Hatfield Gossip, an Englishman, and his wife Mary Ellen Dingley Gossip, of New York. When he was sixteen months old, his mother died; about two years later, he and his father moved to England. His aunt, Mrs. Reaston Rodes, raised him, apparently with little involvement by his father. Gossip grew up at Barlborough Hall, Derbyshire (the Rodes family seat), and at Hatfield, in Yorkshire. Both the Gossip and Rodes families are listed in Burke's Landed Gentry. He was educated at Windermere College, Westmorland, and won a scholarship to Oxford University, but was unable to attend as his father, uncle, and aunts lost a lawsuit that ruined them financially. As a result, Gossip had to support himself through his own labors.

== Non-chess adult life ==
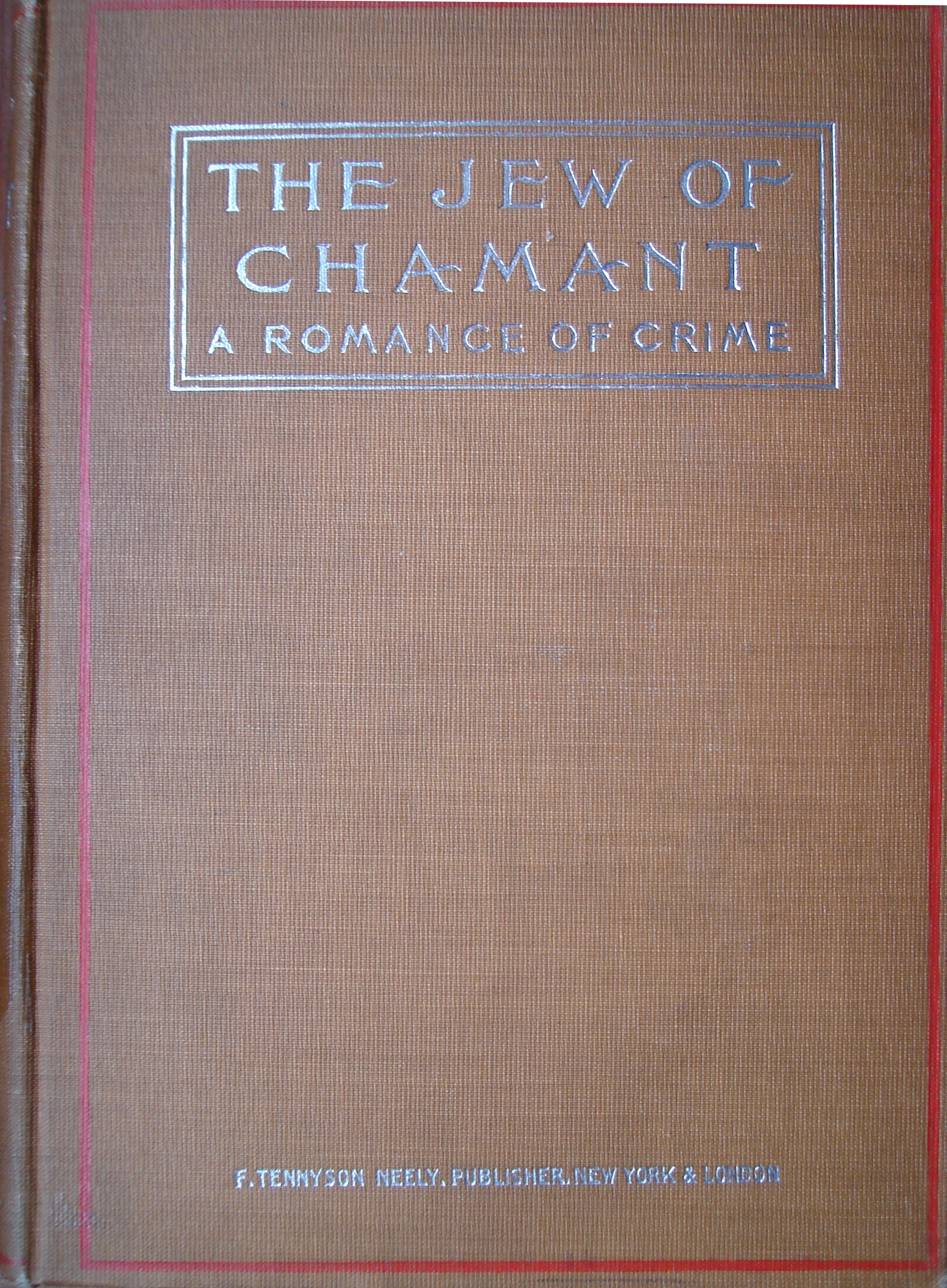
The Jew of Chamant, Gossip's only non-chess book

Gossip made his living primarily as a writer and translator, writing for newspapers and magazines on three continents. His profession is described in the 1871, 1881, and 1891 United Kingdom censuses, respectively, as a "translator of languages", an "author of work on chess", and a member of the "literary profession". He lived for over five years in Paris, contributing to French publications. From 1879 to 1880 he was "employed occasionally as translator and otherwise" in The Times of London's office in Paris. He also lived in Germany.

Gossip married Alicia (the name is sometimes given as "Alice"), a music teacher from Dublin, in Jersey in 1868. As of 1871, they were living in London with their 11-month-old son George and two servants. By 1881, Gossip and his wife had moved to Ipswich, and had three more children: Helen (born c. 1872), Harold (c. 1874), and Mabel (c. 1879). After Gossip's father died in 1882, the Gossips and their four children immigrated to Australia, arriving in January 1883. While in that country, Gossip wrote articles for the Sydney Star, Sydney Globe, Sydney Evening News, Town and Country Journal, The Advertiser (Adelaide), and other publications. He contributed literary articles to Once a Month magazine (Melbourne) and the Sydney Quarterly Magazine.

Gossip moved to the United States in 1888, departing in April from Sydney on the steamship Alameda. In May, the ship arrived in San Francisco, where, Gossip wrote, "I first set foot on my native soil after an absence of over forty years." He wrote articles for the San Francisco Examiner on the "Chinese Question in Australia" and the San Francisco Chronicle on "Protection and Free Trade in New South Wales".

His family apparently remained in Australia, where Alicia died of cancer in October 1888. In 1894, Gossip's children Helen and Harold both married, in Victoria and Melbourne, respectively. Gossip's grandson, George Hatfield Dingley Gossip, born in Sydney in 1897, was a World War I flying ace for Australia, "shooting down six enemy aircraft while flying his Sopwith Camel along the Belgian coast".

In 1889, Gossip returned to Europe. By 1891, he was living as a tenant in a London boarding house. In 1894, he moved to Montreal, Quebec, Canada. While living there, Gossip contributed articles to a newspaper in Manchester, England. The June 1895 British Chess Magazine (BCM) and June 1897 American Chess Magazine reported that he was living in Buffalo, New York.

Under the pseudonym "Ivan Trepoff", Gossip wrote a book, The Jew of Chamant, which was published by Hausauer (Buffalo) in 1898, and by F.T. Neely (London and New York) in 1899. The two versions are subtitled, respectively, "or, the modern Monte Cristo" and "a romance of crime". The book is intensely antisemitic. The author explains in its preface:

My object in the present work is to paint the rich Jew in his true colors, as the enemy of society; to show that the Jew who steals millions, can, in Europe, at any rate, defy the laws with impunity, and that he almost invariably escapes punishment owing to improper occult influences, and the mighty power of Israelitish gold.

The chess literature is silent about the last decade of Gossip's life. He died of heart disease on May 11, 1907, at the Railway Hotel in Liphook, England.

== Chess career ==
By 1864, Gossip was appearing in London chess circles, drawing a game against Joseph Henry Blackburne at a simultaneous exhibition in April. He played in a number of chess tournaments between 1870 and 1895, usually with unimpressive results. At London 1870, the Third British Chess Association Congress (won by John Wisker after a playoff against Amos Burn), Gossip scored two of six possible points, finishing in a tie for fifth–sixth out of seven players. He had the consolation of handing Burn his only loss. At London 1872 (won by Steinitz ahead of Johannes Zukertort and Blackburne), he scored just one out of seven, finishing seventh out of eight players.

Gossip won the 1873–74 correspondence chess tournament of the Chess-Players Chronicle, after which he "was thought by some to be the strongest correspondence player known". However, playing first board for England in an 1879 correspondence chess match against the United States, he lost all four of his games to Ellen Gilbert of Hartford, Connecticut. She "caused a sensation in the chess world" by announcing mate in 21 moves in one game, and mate in 35 moves in another. Gossip responded gallantly, dedicating his book Theory of the Chess Openings to her.

In 1874, Gossip lost a match for the Championship Cup of the Provinces to Rev. John Owen, retiring because of illness after one win, two draws, and two losses. He won a local tournament at the Café de la Régence in Paris in 1880. In 1882, he beat Wordsworth Donisthorpe in a match held at Simpson's Divan in London.

Gossip's first significant success at over-the-board chess came at the 1883 London Vizayanagaram minor tournament. He scored 17½ out of 25, tying for fifth–sixth place out of 26 players with Charles Ranken, who later co-authored the treatise Chess Openings Ancient and Modern (1889). Curt von Bardeleben won with 21½ points; Isidor Gunsberg, who would narrowly lose an 1890–91 World Championship match to Steinitz, finished fourth with 19 points.

In 1885 Gossip, a year after immigrating to Australia, issued a challenge to any player in the Australian colonies to play a match with him for 20 pounds a side and the title of Australian champion. Frederick Karl Esling, a leading Melbourne player, accepted the challenge. While given his experience, Gossip was considered to be a heavy favourite, Esling won the first game, and the second was adjourned in a position favorable to him. Gossip then pleaded illness and forfeited the match. Kenneth Whyld writes that the Australians probably considered Gossip a "whingeing Pom".

An Australian commentator observes, "Gossip may not have been the most popular itinerant to venture to these shores in the nineteenth century, but when he announced his challenge ... he at least brought the question of an official Chess Champion of Australia before the chess playing fraternity". In 1950, when Esling was 90, the Australian Chess Federation formally declared, belatedly, that he had become the first Australian Chess Champion by winning his 1885 match against Gossip. The Second Australian Chess Championship, a tournament, was held at Adelaide in 1887. Gossip finished third with 6½ out of 9, behind Henry Charlick (7½ points) and Esling (7 points).

After returning to America in 1888, Gossip obtained an appointment at the Columbia Chess Club. The following year, he represented England at the Sixth American Chess Congress (New York 1889), one of the greatest tournaments of the 19th century. The Congress, a double round robin that was one of the longest tournaments in history, was intended to select a challenger for the world championship title. There, Gossip had what G. H. Diggle calls "perhaps the best performance of his career". He scored 13½ out of 38 (11 wins, 5 draws, 22 losses), finishing 17th–18th out of 20 players. He won games from S. Lipschütz, Max Judd, Eugene Delmar, Jackson Showalter, William Pollock (twice), Henry Bird (twice), David Graham Baird, James Moore Hanham, and John Washington Baird. Mikhail Chigorin and Max Weiss tied for first with 29 points, edging out Gunsberg (28½ points).

Gossip was unable to repeat even this modest level of success in his final tournaments. He finished last in five consecutive strong events: the Master Section at London 1889 (scoring 1½ out of 10; Bird won on tiebreak over Gunsberg); the Meisterturnier (Master Tournament) at Breslau 1889 (scoring three out of ten; Siegbert Tarrasch won); the Master Section of Manchester 1890 (scoring four out of nineteen; Tarrasch won); the Master Tournament at London 1892 (scoring 2½ out of 11; future World Champion Emanuel Lasker won); and New York 1893 (scoring 2½ out of 13; Lasker won with a perfect score). Gossip's run of last-place finishes moved Diggle to dub him "the King of Wooden Spoonists". Gossip's last event was a minor tournament in Skaneateles, New York, in July–August 1895, where he scored three out of six, finishing in a tie for third–fifth of seven players.

A report in the BCM in 1889 observed that Gossip suffered from great nervousness that prevented him from fully displaying his abilities at chess tournaments, where he had to stop his ears "to keep out the low hum inseparable from a large concourse of people". Bird likewise wrote that minor distractions that he would not even notice would "drive ... Gossip to despair". The BCM commentator accordingly believed that Gossip "would make a good stand in a single encounter with men who are much higher in the tournament than he is".

Following his move to Montreal, Gossip in a letter to a friend dated October 20, 1894, complained, "The French Canadian Chessplayers here are the poorest, meanest humbugs I ever met – all Jesuits." He and Pollock played a match at the Montreal Chess Club in December 1894 and January 1895; each won six games, with five draws. This was an impressive result for Gossip "in view of Pollock's undoubted strength". Later in 1895, Pollock finished 19th out of 22 players, scoring 8 out of 21 (including wins over Tarrasch and Steinitz), at Hastings 1895, arguably at that time the strongest tournament in history. Diggle writes that Gossip's drawn match with Pollock vindicates the BCM's 1889 observation that Gossip would be more at home in a match than a tournament.

Gossip was only a minor master, "a mediocre player who figured at or near the bottom of every better than average tourney in which he participated". However, during his career he played tournament games against most of the world's leading players, including World Champions Lasker and Steinitz; World Championship challengers Zukertort, Tarrasch, Chigorin, and Gunsberg; Louis Paulsen, Harry Nelson Pillsbury, and James Mason, all at some point ranked number 1 in the world by Chessmetrics; Burn, Blackburne, Bird, and Cecil de Vere (all ranked number 2); and Weiss and Wisker (both ranked number 3).

== Chess books and articles ==
The Chess-Player's Manual by George H. D. Gossip and S. Lipschütz (1902 edition)

As of 1874, Gossip was the chess editor of The Hornet. In that year, after several years' work, he published his magnum opus, The Chess-Player's Manual—A Complete Guide to Chess. It was "a handsomely produced work with more than 800 of its 900 pages devoted to openings and illustrative games". The book became the subject of biting criticism, largely because Gossip had included 27 illustrative games that he had won against leading players of the day, and only 12 games that he had lost. Steinitz later wrote:

Mr Gossip had practiced the unfair ruse of carefully preserving stray skittles games which he had happened to win or draw, generally after many defeats, against masters whose public records stood far above his own, ... thus leading the public to believe that the author stood on a par with them, or was even their superior.

According to Diggle, this edition of the book "failed utterly". The harsh reception accorded it embittered Gossip against chess critics for the rest of his life.

In 1879, Gossip published Theory of the Chess Openings, a shorter work more in the style of Modern Chess Openings, which sold out within six months. The preface and the concluding chapter of the book bitterly attacked the critics who had savaged his earlier treatise. This time the critics, "while deploring 'the outside slices of Mr. Gossip's sandwich' ", praised the main body of the work. William Wayte in the Chess Players Chronicle called the book "fairly in possession of the field among English elementary treatises". Unfortunately for Gossip, he "was the victim of an act of gross piracy, as many copies forming no part of the edition printed by his orders were circulated in America and the 'pirates' never brought to justice."

Gossip's Vest-Pocket Chess Manual

While in Australia, Gossip wrote a chess column that appeared in Once a Month magazine from February to October 1885.

A new edition of The Chess-Player's Manual was published in 1888, this one with a 122-page appendix by Lipschütz. Steinitz wrote that "Mr Gossip has produced a useful work, which in some respects must be regarded even superior to that of Staunton or any other previous writers on the chess openings. ... But the most meritorious distinguishing feature of the Manual is the large collection of illustrative games by various first-class masters, and in that respect Mr Gossip's work stands second only to Signor Salvioli's Teoria e Pratica among the analytical works in any language." The following year, Steinitz cited it in The Modern Chess Instructor as one of the 12 principal authorities he had relied on in writing that treatise.

An anonymous reviewer in The New York Times called the new edition of The Chess-Player's Manual "probably the most convenient, trustworthy, and satisfactory chess book accessible in the English language". The reviewer concluded that the games and problems in the volume would "afford great entertainment" to the casual enthusiast, "while for real students of chess ... it is very nearly indispensable". He also praised "Mr. Lipschütz's appendix, which brings the development of the openings almost down to date". David Hooper and Kenneth Whyld write in The Oxford Companion to Chess that Lipschütz's appendix "helped to make this one of the standard opening books of the time". World Champion Bobby Fischer had a copy of The Chess-Player's Manual in his personal library, and cited it in his famous 1961 article "A Bust to the King's Gambit".

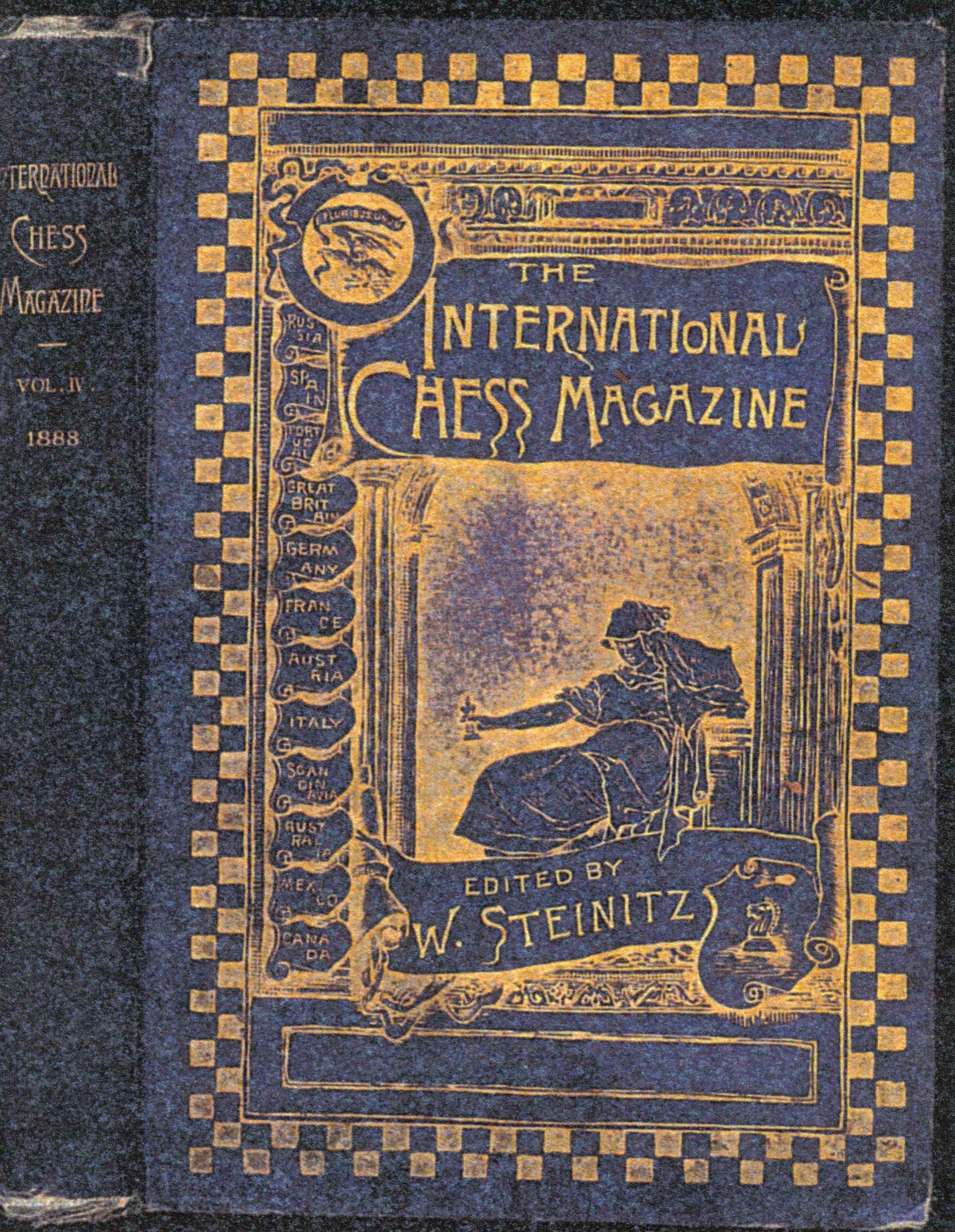
Steinitz's International Chess Magazine (1888)

The June 1888 issue of Steinitz's International Chess Magazine contained an article by Gossip that Robert John McCrary calls "a very illuminating, important, and detailed account of the state of San Francisco chess". For the last few months of 1888 Gossip was listed as being on the "Editorial Staff" of the Columbia Chess Chronicle. Its December 29, 1888, issue contained a lengthy article by him entitled "Chess in the Present Day", which offered a broad sweep of chess history and the advances made by chess in the United States. Gossip called Paul Morphy and Steinitz "the two greatest chessplayers that have ever lived" and remarked that "no Englishman has yet attained, or probably ever will attain, to the eminence of chess champion of the world. ... The deep-thinking German, the brilliant Frenchman and the versatile American have always been too much for sober, stolid John Bull."

Gossip in 1891 published a second revised edition of his Theory of the Chess Openings, which Diggle calls "a handsome volume with an appendix of sixty-one pages". Characteristically, he devoted much of the appendix to criticizing his detractors and anticipating their further attacks.

Gossip also wrote the lesser-known chess books The Chess Players' Text Book (1889), The Chess-player's Vade Mecum and Pocket Guide to the Openings (1891), Modern Chess Brilliancies (1892), The Chess Player's Pocket Guide to Games at Odds (1893), The Chess Pocket Manual (1894), The Chess Player's Mentor (with Francis Joseph Lee, 1895), The Complete Chess-Guide (with Lee, 1903), Gossip's Vest-Pocket Chess Manual (date unknown; pictured at above left), and a collection of his own games, Games: G. H. D. Gossip versus Bezkrowny, Clerc, Donisthorpe, Gocher, Gunsberg, Hoffer, Owen, Sanders, Vines Played During the Last 10 Years in England & France (1882, with Gunsberg and Steinitz).

== Manner and reputation ==
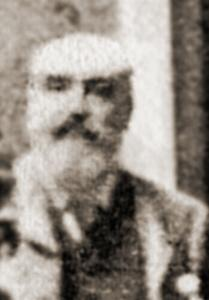
Gossip in New York, 1893

Burn's biographer Richard Forster notes that Gossip "was well-known for his exaggerated self-esteem". Philip Sergeant in his book A Century of British Chess remarks that his "play was never quite up to his own estimate of it". The New York Times portrays him at the Sixth American Chess Congress (1889) as follows:

Gossip, with his long, flowing beard, looks like one of the old-time monks. He has a good-shaped cranium, bald at the top, and is a little above the medium height. ... He believes himself to be one of the greatest chessplayers in the world, and thinks that if everything had gone on to his liking he could have beaten all the champions at the tournament. He is a deliberate player, but every now and then he takes a nip from a flask of brandy that generally stands on his table. He complained that his chair was too low, and he once attributed a defeat to that. Finally, he got a large ledger and sat upon it. He did, in fact, seem to derive some inspiration from its contents, for he played two or three excellent games afterward.

Diggle observes that Gossip "developed 'a happy knack of treading on other people's corns' by rushing into print" his occasional wins in offhand games against such leading players as Bird and Zukertort. He also vehemently denounced his critics and those with whom he disagreed. For example, in 1888 the Columbia Chess Chronicle quoted a lecture he had given two days before on the Steinitz Gambit. After condemning as "utterly worthless" the analysis of that opening published in two English periodicals, Gossip declaimed:

In order, therefore, to establish an important point of theory, and at the same time to prevent American chessplayers from being misled and deceived by the superficial analysis of incompetent British chess editors, whose object in condemning the Steinitz Gambit has obviously been mainly to depreciate the originality of its illustrious inventor, whom they invariably try to drag down to their own miserable level of shallow incompetency and self-conceit, I submit the following variations which at any rate possess the undeniable merit of exposing the hollow analytical twaddle continually published in the two London journals above named.

Hooper and Whyld note Gossip's "unusual talent for making enemies" and attribute the critical reception of his books to this, since in their opinion "his books were not significantly worse than the general run of the time, and they were better than, for example, those by Bird, who was popular". They remark on his travels that, "Disliked in England, he travelled to Australia, the United States, and Canada, where he also became unpopular." Some measure of his talent for stirring up controversy is provided by a letter Pollock wrote during their 1894–95 match:

I and Gossip are six each and may draw the match. He has proved a terrible crank and has had several games by forfeit, and one "cancelled". He now has a libel suit against the chess column of the Herald. ... We have just agreed, per the committee, to call the match a draw. Whereby all parties are relieved.

Chess historian Edward Winter observes that "Gossip has always been a soft target for mockery". He notes that Hooper and Whyld in the first edition (1984) of The Oxford Companion to Chess "treated him essentially as light relief"; the second edition (1992) treated him more equitably, but like the first omitted any mention of his performance at New York 1889. Yakov Damsky in The Batsford Book of Chess Records (2005), addressing the question of which player "achieved the greatest negative distinction" on the international level, opines that Gossip "can probably feel safe from competition". Mike Fox and Richard James in their book The Even More Complete Chess Addict (1993) write that, "Of players who've entered chess history, perhaps the strongest claimant for the all-time grandpatzer title is George Hatfeild Dingley Gossip (1841–1907). George had a worse record in major tournaments than anyone in history (last at Breslau 1889, London 1889, Manchester 1890, London 1892, and New York 1893: a total of just four wins, 52 losses and 21 draws)." Like Hooper and Whyld, they overlook his result at New York 1889, a major tournament where he won 11 games and finished above the bottom. In a 2001 article, Whyld himself takes notice of Gossip's result at New York 1889 and suggests that "history has perhaps given him an unfair verdict".

By Arpad Elo's calculation, Gossip's strength during his five-year peak was equivalent to an Elo rating of 2310.

Another assessment system, Chessmetrics, calculates that Gossip's highest rating was 2470 (number 50 in the world) in April 1889. By comparison, the world's three highest-rated players at that time had Chessmetrics ratings over 2700. Chessmetrics also ranks Gossip number 17 in the world during four one-month periods between February and July 1873, when opportunities for high-level competition were much rarer. Like Diggle, Chessmetrics considers New York 1889 Gossip's best individual performance, concluding that he scored 39% against opponents with an average rating of 2595, giving him a performance rating of 2539 for that tournament. In 1904, the Deutsche Schachzeitung, on the basis of its tabulation of players' percentage scores in all major international tournaments from London 1851 to Cambridge Springs 1904, ranked Gossip the number 62 living player in the world.

Diggle writes that despite his faults, Gossip was "a man of dauntless courage and infinite capacity for hard work", which enabled him to become a recognized author despite the disastrous reception that the first edition of his Chess-Player's Manual received. His literary style was vigorous, and shows him to be an educated and well-read man.

== Notable games ==
=== Showalter vs. Gossip, New York 1889 ===
The following game was played between future five-time U.S. Champion Jackson Showalter (White) and Gossip (Black) at the Sixth American Chess Congress, New York 1889.

Showalter vs. Gossip, 1889

Position: b8 black king, d8 black rook, g8 black rook, a7 black pawn, c7 black pawn, g7 black queen, c6 black pawn, f6 black pawn, d5 black pawn, e5 black knight, b4 white pawn, d4 black bishop, g4 black bishop, h4 white bishop, b3 white queen, c3 white knight, a2 white pawn, c2 white pawn, f2 white pawn, g2 white pawn, h2 white pawn, b1 white rook, e1 white rook, f1 white bishop, g1 white king

Position after 24.Bxh4?

Position: b8 black king, d8 black rook, a7 black pawn, c7 black pawn, c6 black pawn, f6 black pawn, d5 black pawn, b4 white pawn, b3 white queen, c3 white knight, f3 black bishop, h3 black rook, a2 white pawn, c2 white pawn, f2 black bishop, h2 white king, b1 white rook, e1 white rook

Final position after 29...Rxh3+!

1. e4 e5 2. Nf3 Nc6 3. d4 exd4 4. Nxd4 Nf6 5. Nxc6 bxc6 6. Bd3 d5 7. e5? 7.exd5 is correct. 7... Ng4 8. 0-0 Bc5 9. Bf4 9.h3 Nxe5 10.Re1 fails to 10...Qf6 11.Qe2 0-0! 12.Qxe5 Qxf2+ 13.Kh1 Bxh3! 9... g5! 10. Bd2 White is already in serious trouble. 10.Bg3 is met by 10...h5! 11.h3 h4! 12.Bh2 Nxh2 13.Kxh2 g4! 14.hxg4 Qg5 15.Be2 Qf4+ 16.Kh1 (or 16.Kg1 h3!) 16...Bxf2 and wins. 10... Nxe5 11. Re1 Qe7 12. Nc3 Bd7 13. Qh5 0-0-0! Since 13...h6 would still be answered by 14.Bxg5, Gossip sacrifices the pawn, anticipating a killing attack along the g-file. 14. Bxg5 f6 15. Bh4 Qg7 16. Ba6+ Kb8 17. Bg3 Rhg8 18. Qd1 Ng4 More accurate was 18...Bg4 followed by ...h5, initiating the same attack that Black begins on his 20th move. 19. Bf1 Ne5 20. b4 Bg4 21. Qb1? 21.Be2 was better than this attempt at counterattack. 21... Bd4 22. Qb3 h5! 23. Rab1 h4! Steinitz writes, "The initiation of a masterly combination eight moves deep." 24. Bxh4? 24.Bxe5 holds out longer. Now, writes Andrew Soltis, "Black crowned his play with one of the most beautiful combinations ever played." 24... Nf3+! 25. gxf3 25.Kh1 Nxh4 leaves Black a piece ahead with a won game. 25... Bxf3+ 26. Bg3 Qxg3+! 27. hxg3 Rxg3+ 28. Kh2 If 28.Bg2, 28...Rxg2+ 29.Kf1 Rh2 and mates. 28... Bxf2 29. Bh3 Rxh3+! 0–1 White resigned. 30.Kxh3 is met by ...Rh8#.

Fred Reinfeld calls the game "a glorious masterpiece". Steinitz proclaims, "One of the finest specimens of sacrificing play on record. Mr. Gossip deserves the highest praise for the ingenuity and depth of combination which he displayed in this game." Soltis writes that "there were many raised eyebrows" when the tournament committee awarded the prize for the best-played game not to Gossip for this game, but to Gunsberg for his win over Mason. After comparing the two games, Whyld writes, "The verdict seems clear. Gossip was robbed!" Diggle states, "Gossip was, of course, the last man to keep quiet about this decision, and for once he had considerable public sympathy on his side."

=== Chigorin vs. Gossip, New York 1889 ===
Chigorin vs. Gossip, 1889

Position: a8 black rook, f8 black bishop, h8 black rook, a7 black pawn, b7 black pawn, c7 black pawn, d7 black bishop, e7 black king, f7 white bishop, g7 black pawn, h7 black pawn, c6 black knight, g6 black knight, a5 black queen, f5 black pawn, d4 white pawn, e4 black pawn, b3 white queen, c3 white pawn, a2 white pawn, b2 white pawn, d2 white knight, f2 white pawn, g2 white pawn, h2 white pawn, a1 white rook, b1 white knight, c1 white bishop, f1 white rook, g1 white king

Position after 12...Ke7?

Position: a8 black rook, f8 black bishop, h8 black rook, a7 black pawn, b7 black pawn, c7 black pawn, d7 black bishop, f7 black king, g7 black pawn, h7 black pawn, a6 black queen, c6 black knight, d6 white knight, g6 black knight, f5 black pawn, g5 white bishop, d4 white pawn, e4 black pawn, b3 white queen, c3 white pawn, a2 white pawn, b2 white pawn, f2 white pawn, g2 white pawn, h2 white pawn, a1 white rook, b1 white knight, f1 white rook, g1 white king

Final position after 15.Nd6#

When facing world-class opponents, Gossip more often fell victim to their combinations. A famous example is his loss, also at New York 1889, to Mikhail Chigorin (White), who lost world championship matches to Steinitz in 1889 and 1892.

1. e4 e5 2. Nf3 Nc6 3. c3 d5 3...Nf6 is the safest response if Black is not well versed in the ensuing complications—as Gossip proves not to be. 4. Qa4 f6 5. Bb5 Ne7 6.exd5 Qxd5 7. 0-0 7.d4! is the main line today. 7... Bd7? 7...e4! 8.Ne1 Bf5 9.f3 leads to equality. 8. d4 e4 9. Nfd2 Ng6? 9...f5! was correct. 10. Bc4 Qa5 11. Qb3 f5? 11...0-0-0! was the best chance. 12. Bf7+ Ke7? Yet another mistake; 12...Kd8 is forced. Yakov Damsky asks, "Just how many wrong moves is it possible to play?" 13. Nc4! Setting up a problem-like finish with a fatal double check two moves later. 13... Qa6 14. Bg5+! Kxf7 15. Nd6# 1–0
