= Oxford University Chess Club =

University Chess Society

- Type: University Chess Club
- Founded: 1869
- Location: Oxford
- Country: England
- Membership: 50+
- Affiliation: University of Oxford
- Website: Official Website

The Oxford University Chess Club (OUCC) was founded at the University of Oxford in 1869. It is the oldest university chess club in the United Kingdom. The Club meets each Tuesday evening during University term time. They field three teams in the Oxfordshire Chess League.

== Foundation ==
On the day of the foundation of OUCC, the minutes book recorded:

April 30th, [1869] – This day is memorable as being the date of the foundation of the Club, which was started under the auspices of the Reverend C. E. Ranken, of Wadham College, who was chosen as the first President. E. F. Linton, University, was elected Treasurer, and W. Braithwaite, Wadham, Secretary. A code of rules was drawn up, and the Club, having received its constitution, entered upon what we trust will prove to be a long and glorious career. No less than one hundred and three names were entered upon the first list of members. Amongst others were those of Lord Randolph Churchill, Merton, E. Anthony, Christ Church ("one of the best pupils Steinitz turned out"), E.W.B. Nicholson, Trinity, the present Bodleian Librarian, Lord Garvagh, Canon Grey, Christ Church &c., &c. The meetings were held weekly on Wednesdays, and the early members appear to have been more desirous of playing one another than of engaging in foreign matches.

Prince Leopold, later Duke of Albany (1853–1884) (and son of Queen Victoria) was President of OUCC in 1875.

== Varsity match ==
The annual Varsity Match against Cambridge University was originally suggested by Howard Staunton in 1853. It has been held annually since 1873 and is the oldest fixture on the chess calendar. Edwin Anthony, then President of the club, and Wilhelm Steinitz were responsible for establishing the match.

With a twenty-year perspective on the matches, Henry Bird wrote that the greatest of the matches were the first two, held in 1873 and 1874 at the City of London Chess Club, City Restaurant (Perrott's), 34 Milk-street, Cheapside. The first match was said to have had 600 to 800 spectators and the second no fewer than 700, thought to be record attendance at any chess tournament up to that time. Each team consisted of seven players, and sand glasses were used to time some of the games at the limit of 20 moves per hour. Oxford won the first year, and Cambridge the second.

The 1874 match was attended by nearly every London chess luminary of the time, including Howard Staunton, Wilhelm Steinitz (officiated as an umpire), Johann Löwenthal, Bernhard Horwitz, Johannes Zukertort, Henry Bird, Joseph Henry Blackburne, Cecil Valentine De Vere, George Alcock MacDonnell, Samuel Boden, Patrick Thomas Duffy, Adolf Zytogorski, John Wisker, and others. In addition to the university match, the event included two exhibitions. Zukertort played six blindfold games (+2−1=3) and Blackburne played a seven-board simultaneous exhibition with fresh opponents starting on the boards as the games finished for a total of 20 games (+17−3=0).

Oxford won the 2011 match, the 129th official contest, 4.5-3.5 to bring the overall score to Cambridge 66 Oxford 63.

== Other events ==
- On 2 December 1944 a famous 12-board match took place between OUCC and Bletchley Chess Club whose members consisted of the Bletchley Park code-breakers. Bletchley won 8–4 with C.H.O’D. Alexander and Harry Golombek on boards 1 and 2.
- On 15 February 2004 OUCC beat Wales 6–2.
- OUCC 1sts won the 2004-05 Oxfordshire Chess League and David Shaw, top board, was awarded the prize for best player with a remarkable 9/10.
- OUCC 2nds won the 2006-07 Oxfordshire Chess League.
- On 18 February 2012 OUCC won the 2nds varsity match against Cambridge 5.5-4.5.

== Notable games ==
In 1978 a memorable upset occurred when IM Michael Basman beat Oxford postgraduate GM John Nunn with the Grob.

Michael Basman vs. John Nunn, Oxford, 1978

1. g4 d5 2. h3 e5 3. d3 Bd6 4. c4 c6 5. Nc3 Ne7 6. Nf3 h5 7. gxh5 Rxh5 8. Bd2 a6 9. e4 dxc4 10. dxc4 Nd7 11. Ng5 Nf6 12. Qf3 Ng6 13. O-O-O Qe7 14. Kb1 Nf4 15. Rg1 Kf8 16. Ne2 Ne6 17. Nxe6+ Bxe6 18. Ng3 Rh8 19. Bg5 Rd8 20. Be2 Rxh3 21. Qg2 Bc7 22. Nh5 Rxd1+ 23. Rxd1 Rxh5 24. Bxh5 Qb4 25. Be2 Bxc4 26. Bxc4 Qxc4 27. Bxf6 gxf6 28. Qg4 Qe6 29. Qxe6 fxe6 30. Rd7 1–0

== Notable members and officers ==
=== Notable members ===
- Prince Leopold, Duke of Albany
- Lord Randolph Churchill
- Wilhelm Steinitz
- Theodore Tylor
- Adrian Hollis
- Leonard Barden
- Peter Lee
- Jon Speelman
- John Nunn
- David Norwood
- Graham Russell Mitchell
- Peter Wells
- Luke McShane
- Jonathan Rowson
- Richard Palliser
- Amon Simutowe

=== Officers ===
==== President ====
First president of the club was founder Rev. Charles E. Ranken. At his peak, he was the 24th best player in the world - a grandmaster by today's standards. The office, which was at first termly, has been annual since 1884.

Name	College	Served from	Reference
Charles Ranken	Wadham	30 April 1869	
E. Anthony	Christ Church	23 March 1870	
E.W.B. Nicholson	Trinity	9 December 1870	
C.T. Wild	Christ Church	6 March 1871	
R.D.H. Gray	Brasenose	5 December 1871	
W.E. Foster	University	12 March 1872	
Falconer Madan	Brasenose	4 June 1872	
B. Whitefoord	New	4 December 1872	
J.S. Sinclair	Oriel	12 March 1873	
S.R. Meredith	Brasenose	27 May 1873	
Walter Parratt	Magdalen	3 December 1873	
Prince Leopold	Christ Church	18 March 1874	
Horace Plunkett	University	December 1875	
C. Tracey	Lincoln	26 October 1876	
W. Grundy	Worcester	14 March 1877	
R.A. Germaine	Brasenose	December 1877	
F.M. Wright	Queen's	1 November 1878	
Walter Montague Gattie	Christ Church	5 December 1878	
E.H. Kinder	Brasenose	20 March 1879	
C. Taylor	Christ Church	1 December 1879	
B.R.V. Mills	Christ Church	5 March 1880	
J.F. Welsh	Christ Church	26 October 1880	
C.A. Darley	Christ Church	18 March 1881	
T.A. Wise	Lincoln	17 June 1881	
W.N.P. Beebe	Trinity	17 March 1882	
G.E. Wainwright	University	9 June 1882	
C.C. Lynam	Hertford	Summer 1883	
James Manders Walker	Wadham	Michaelmas 1883	
H. Seward	Balliol	Midsummer 1884	
C.D. Locock	University	Michaelmas 1884	
Richard Barnett	Wadham	Michaelmas 1885	
F.G. Newbolt	Balliol	Hilary 1887	
W. Storey	Christ Church	October 1887	
A.G.G. Ross	New	Michaelmas 1888	
W.M. Le Patourel	Balliol	October 1889	
J.F. Ure	Christ Church	October 1890	
F.E. Jelly	Magdalen	October 1891	
...			
Harold Davidson	Exeter	Michaelmas 1900	
...			
G. Davies	?	Michaelmas 1909	
...			
Neil Crabb	St Edmund Hall	Trinity 1987	
Mark Addis	Mansfield	Trinity 1988	
Paul Muhkerjee	Lady Margaret Hall	Trinity 1989	
Martin Hazelton	St Anne's	Trinity 1990	
Mark Nightall	Brasenose	Trinity 1991	
...			
Matthew Piper	Wadham	1993	
Michael Gough	New	Trinity 1994	
Shashi Jayakumar	St Hugh's	Trinity 1995	
Maxim Devereaux	Brasenose	Trinity 1996	
Ben Savage	Lady Margaret Hall	Trinity 1997	
Emily Howard	Lincoln	Trinity 1998	
Kieran Smallbone	New	Trinity 1999	
Chris Dunsmore	Lincoln	Trinity 2000	
Jon Smith	Queen's	Trinity 2001	
Richard Palliser	Worcester	Trinity 2002	
Chris Duggan	University	Trinity 2003	
David Shaw	Worcester	Trinity 2004	
Hervé Hansen	Queen's	Trinity 2005	
Marco Zhang	St Hugh's	Trinity 2006	
Mike Healey	University	Trinity 2007	
Yi Ming Lai	Exeter	Trinity 2008	
Eoin Devane	Merton	Trinity 2009	
Stephen Belding	St John's	Trinity 2010	
Erik Thörnblad	St Hugh's	Trinity 2011	
David Hewitt	St Edmund Hall	Trinity 2012	
Sam Bentham	Christ Church	Trinity 2013	
Robert Collopy	New College	Trinity 2014	
Sean Lim	St Hilda's College	Trinity 2015	
David Martins	Worcester	Trinity 2016	
Jamie Horton	Christ Church	Trinity 2017	
Joris Gerlagh	University	Trinity 2018	
Andrew Rogozinski	Worcester	Trinity 2019	
Aloysius Lip	Christ Church	Trinity 2020	
Victor Vasiesiu	Hertford	Trinity 2021	
Max French	Wadham	Michaelmas 2022	
Tom O'Gorman	Hertford	Michaelmas 2023	
Jem Gurner	Magdalene	Michaelmas 2024	
Connor Clarke	Hertford	Michaelmas 2025	

==== Treasurer ====
Name	College	Served from	Reference
E.F. Linton	University	30 April 1869	
E.L. Holland	University	8 February 1870	
Rev. C. Rodwell	Trinity	23 March 1870	
R.D.H. Gray	Brasenose	9 December 1870	
T.C.V. Bastow	Trinity	5 June 1871	
Falconer Madan	Brasenose	12 March 1872	
E. Petit Jelf	Christ Church	4 June 1872	
J.S. Leadam	Brasenose	12 March 1873	
F.H. Woods	Jesus	3 May 1873	
A.R.C. Connell	Trinity	16 December 1874	
S.R. Meredith	Brasenose	14 April 1875	
W.P. Emerton	Christ Church	December 1875	
R.A. Germaine	Brasenose	26 October 1876	
E.J. Crosse	Exeter	4 December 1876	
W.M. Gattie	Christ Church	6 June 1877	
F.M. Wright	Queen's	18 March 1878	
E.H. Kinder	Brasenose	1 November 1878	
C. Taylor	Christ Church	20 March 1879	
B.R.V. Mills	Christ Church	1 December 1879	
J.F. Welsh	Christ Church	5 March 1880	
C.A. Darley	Christ Church	26 October 1880	
C.C. Lynam	Hertford	18 March 1881	
W.N.P. Beebe	Trinity	17 June 1881	
T.A. Wise	Lincoln	17 March 1882	
James Manders Walker	Wadham	Lent 1883	
S. Weall	St. John's	Michaelmas 1883	
F. Tracey	Exeter	Lent 1884	
C.D. Locock	University	Midsummer 1884	
James Manders Walker	Wadham	Lent 1885	
F.G. Newbolt	Balliol	Winter 1885	
S.J. Buchanan	New	Lent 1886	
F.G. Newbolt	Balliol	Michaelmas 1886	
W. Stoney	Christ Church	Hilary 1887	
A.G.G. Ross	New	October 1887	
W.M. Le Patourel	Balliol	Michaelmas 1888	
Frank Edward Jelly	Magdalen	October 1889	
R.G. Grimley	Balliol	October 1890	
G.G. Lynam	St. Catherine's	October 1891	
...			
T.A. Staynes	Brasenose	Michaelmas 1920	
...			
Ian Webster	St. Anne's	Trinity 2001	
Simon Breen	Trinity	Trinity 2003	
Ed Stembridge	Balliol	Trinity 2004	
Ed Stembridge	Balliol	Trinity 2005	
Alexander Dutton	Keble	Trinity 2006	
Ed Stembridge	Balliol	Trinity 2007	
Zubin Siganporia	St Catherine's	Trinity 2008	
Kevin Henbest	(Unattached)	Trinity 2009	
Matthew Wills	Trinity	Trinity 2010	
Samuel Woolacott	Queen's	Trinity 2011	
Erik Thörnblad	St Hugh's	Trinity 2012	
Sean Lim	St Hilda's	Trinity 2013	
Sean Lim	St Hilda's	Trinity 2014	
Gordon Scott	Merton	Trinity 2015	
Angelos Vakalis	Lincoln	Trinity 2016	
David Martins	Worcester	Trinity 2017	
Alexander Hardwick	Magdalen	Trinity 2018	
Aloysius Lip	Christ Church	Trinity 2019	
Callum Evans	St John's College	Trinity 2020	
Aditi Agarwal	New	Trinity 2021	
Ruairi Garrett	St Peter's	Michaelmas 2022	
Ashvin Sivakumar	Harris Manchester	Michaelmas 2023	
Ashvin Sivakumar	Harris Manchester	Michaelmas 2024	
Kai Beaumont	Trinity	Michaelmas 2025	

==== Secretary ====
Name	College	Served from	Reference
W. Braithwaite	Wadham	30 April 1869	
W.H. Fisher	Exeter	20 October 1869	
E. Morgan	Lincoln	8 February 1870	
E.W.B. Nicholson	Trinity	23 March 1870	
T. Constable	Magdalen	9 December 1870	
J.T. Dodd	Christ Church	6 March 1871	
J.A. Curling	St. Alban's	5 June 1871	
Falconer Madan	Brasenose	5 December 1871	
E. Petit Jelf	Christ Church	12 March 1872	
J.S. Sinclair	Oriel	4 June 1872	
S.R. Meredith	Brasenose	4 December 1872	
A.E.P. Gray	Brasenose	12 March 1873	
F.H. Woods	Jesus	28 May 1873	
A.R.C. Connell	Trinity	3 December 1873	
Horace Plunkett	University	4 June 1874	
W. Parratt	Magdalen	16 December 1874	
A.F. Leupolt	Brasenose	December 1875	
C.L. Brook	Trinity	15 October 1876	
W.M. Gattie	Christ Church	4 December 1876	
R.M. Latham	Exeter	6 June 1877	
F.M. Wright	Queen's	8 February 1878	
A.S. Perceval	Trinity	18 March 1878	
C. Taylor	Christ Church	1 November 1878	
B.R.V. Mills	Christ Church	20 March 1879	
C. Scott-Malden	Trinity	1 December 1879	
C.A. Darley	Christ Church	8 March 1880	
T.A. Wise	Lincoln	26 October 1880	
W.N.P. Beebe	Trinity	18 March 1881	
G.E. Wainwright	University	17 June 1881	
J. Moultrie	New	17 March 1882	
James Manders Walker	Wadham	21 April 1882	
S. Weall	St. John's	Lent 1883	
S.H. Nash	Balliol	Summer 1883	
C.D. Locock	University	Michaelmas 1883	
W.A. Shearer	Exeter	Midsummer 1884	
Richard Barnett	Wadham	Lent 1885	
S.J. Buchanan	New	Winter 1885	
A. Rutherford	Brasenose	Lent 1886	
S.J. Buchanan	New	Michaelmas 1886	
A.G.G. Ross	New	Hilary 1887	
F. Tillyard	Balliol	October 1887	
E.B. Osborne	Magdalen	Michaelmas 1888	
L.C. Crump	Balliol	October 1889	
F.E. Jelly	Magdalen	October 1890	
A.B. Hinds	Christ Church	October 1891	
P.W. Sergeant	Trinity	Michaelmas 1892	
E.W. Poynton	Exeter	Michaelmas 1893	
E.G. Spencer Churchill	Exeter	Michaelmas 1895	
G. Fraser	Corpus Christi	Michaelmas 1896	
A.H.W. George	New	Michaelmas 1897	
Frederick Soddy	Merton	Michaelmas 1898	
Harold Davidson	Exeter	Michaelmas 1900	
A.C. von Ernshausen	Balliol	Michaelmas 1901	
W.N. MacFarlane	University	Michaelmas 1904	
H.J. Rose	Balliol	Michaelmas 1905	
N.J. Roughton	New	Michaelmas 1906	
A.P. Waterfield	Christ Church	Michaelmas 1908	
Ernest Shepherd	?	Michaelmas 1909	
B.A. Bull	Jesus	Michaelmas 1910	
G. Davies	Pembroke	Michaelmas 1911	
P.A. MacMahon	Hertford	Michaelmas 1914	
H.D. Wells	Pembroke	Michaelmas 1915	
C. Duffield	St. John's	Michaelmas 1916	
H.R. Bigelow	Balliol	Michaelmas 1920	
W.E.B. Pryer	Pembroke	Michaelmas 1921	
G.S.A. Wheatcroft	New	Michaelmas 1924	
K.H. Bancroft	Pembroke	Michaelmas 1926	
G. Abraham	Wadham	Michaelmas 1927	
...			
Lucy Martin	Somerville	Trinity 1990	
Nasir Rizvi	St Catherine's	Michaelmas 1996	
Kieran Smallbone	New	Trinity 2001	
Adam Shardlow	University	Trinity 2003	
Ben Kamil	Brasenose	Trinity 2004	
Ben Kamil	Brasenose	Trinity 2005	
Ben Kamil	Brasenose	Trinity 2007	
James Worthen	Brasenose	Trinity 2008	
Stephen Belding	St John's	Trinity 2009	
Jay Unadkat	St. Anne's	Trinity 2010	
Szymon Pozimski	St. Peter's	Trinity 2011	
Michael Hopkins	Lincoln	Trinity 2012	
David Hewitt	St Edmund Hall	Trinity 2013	
Hendrick Brackmannn	St Catherine's	Trinity 2014	
David Martins	Worcester	Trinity 2015	
Daniel Sutton	St John's	Trinity 2016	
Daniel Sutton	St John's	Trinity 2017	
Andrew Rogozinski	Worcester	Trinity 2018	
Filip Mihov	Balliol	Trinity 2019	
Akshaya Kalaiyalahan	Regent's Park	Trinity 2020	
Akshaya Kalaiyalahan	Regent's Park	Trinity 2021	
Réka Sztáray	Hertford	Michaelmas 2022	
Niall Clarke	Worcester	Michaelmas 2023	
