= Stonewall Attack =

Chess opening

Position: d4 white pawn, f4 white pawn, c3 white pawn, d3 white bishop, e3 white pawn, f3 white knight, a2 white pawn, b2 white pawn, d2 white knight, g2 white pawn, h2 white pawn, a1 white rook, c1 white bishop, d1 white queen, e1 white king, h1 white rook
The Stonewall set-up
- Moves: d4, e3, Bd3, Nbd2, f4, Ngf3, c3
- ECO: D00, A03, A45
- Parent: Queen's Pawn Game

The Stonewall Attack is a chess opening system characterized by White playing pawns to d4 and e3, bishop to d3, knight to d2, and then completing the Stonewall structure by playing pawns to c3 and f4. This set-up is usually achieved by a 1.d4 move order but transposition is also possible via Bird's Opening, 1.f4. The Stonewall Attack is a system; White heads for a very specific pawn formation, rather than trying to memorize long lines of different variations. Black can set up in various ways in response, but MCO-15 gives the following as a main line: 1.d4 d5 2.e3 Nf6 3.Bd3 c5 4.c3 Nc6 5.f4.

== History ==
The earliest recorded game to feature the Stonewall Attack would appear to have been Howard Staunton vs John Cochrane, London, 1842. The first player to use the opening regularly, however, was the Boston master Preston Ware, who frequently opened 1.d4 2.f4 from 1876 to 1882. Employing this unusual move order Ware was often able to reach Stonewall type positions (although later players would usually precede f4 with moves such as e3, Bd3 and Nd2). Ware's greatest success with the opening was at the exceptionally strong Vienna tournament of 1882 where he defeated future world champion Wilhelm Steinitz.

In 1893 Harry Nelson Pillsbury had notable success with the Stonewall Attack during the two New York tournaments of that year, venturing the opening on six occasions and winning all six. After Pillsbury's success the Stonewall Attack became established in master play and appeared frequently in the games of American masters Jackson Showalter and Frank Marshall, and English master F.J. Lee. Other prominent players to have used the opening included Lasker, Capablanca, Alekhine, Chigorin, Rubinstein, Tarrasch, Réti, Tartakower, Maróczy and Breyer. By the early 1920s the Stonewall Attack began to disappear from top level chess, although it remains a popular choice at club level. The most notable modern day practitioner is American IM Yaacov Norowitz who has played the opening extensively in online blitz with considerable success.

The Stonewall set-up, when employed by Black, remains one of the main options within the Dutch Defence and has been used by Magnus Carlsen to defeat Viswanathan Anand and Fabiano Caruana.

== Description ==
White's Stonewall pawn formation gives good control of the central dark squares (particularly e5, which may provide an outpost for a knight). The light squared weaknesses are covered by minor pieces (Bd3, Nd2). If permitted to do so, White may launch a direct kingside attack involving ideas such as Bxh7, Qh5 and Rf3-h3. A 1981 article in Chess Life magazine gave the following line as an example of how play can develop if Black defends weakly.

1.d4 d5 2.f4 Nf6 3.e3 e6 4.Nf3 c5 5.c3 Nc6 6.Bd3 Bd6 7.0-0 0-0 8.Nbd2 b6 9.Ne5 Bb7 10.g4 Qc7 11.g5 Nd7 12.Bxh7+ Kxh7 13.Qh5+ Kg8 14.Rf3 f6 15.Rh3 fxe5 16.g6 1–0

While such primitive tactics cannot be expected to succeed against experienced chess players, the illustrative games below demonstrate that in the Stonewall's heyday White was often able to develop a dangerous initiative even against master level opposition.

The disadvantages of the Stonewall Attack are a rather inflexible pawn structure, long-term light square weaknesses and the 'bad bishop' on c1, constrained by White's own pawns, which also impedes the development of the queen's rook.

== Illustrative games ==
- Harry Nelson Pillsbury vs. Jean Taubenhaus, New York (Impromptu Congress) 1893: 1. d4 d5 2. e3 e6 3. Bd3 Bd6 4. f4 c5 5. c3 Nc6 6. Nf3 Nf6 7. O-O O-O 8. Ne5 g6 9. Nd2 Ne8 10. Ndf3 f6 11. Nxc6 bxc6 12. Qe2 f5 13. Bd2 Rb8 14. Rab1 Nf6 15. Kh1 Ne4 16. Be1 c4 17. Bc2 Qa5 18. a3 Qc7 19. g4 fxg4 20. Ne5 Nf6 21. Rg1 c5 22. Bh4 cxd4 23. cxd4 Bxe5 24. fxe5 Ne8 25. Rxg4 Qf7 26. Rg3 Ng7 27. Bf6 Ne8 28. Bxg6 hxg6 29. Qh5 Rb7 30. Qh8# 1-0
- Harry Nelson Pillsbury vs. James Hanham, New York (Masters) 1893: 1. d4 d5 2. e3 e6 3. Bd3 Nf6 4. f4 Bd6 5. Nf3 b6 6. O-O O-O 7. c3 c5 8. Ne5 Qc7 9. Nd2 Nc6 10. Rf3 Bb7 11. Rh3 cxd4 12. Bxh7+ Nxh7 13. Qh5 Rfe8 14. Qxh7+ Kf8 15. exd4 f6 16. Ng6+ Kf7 17. Rg3 Rg8 18. Nf3 Ne7 19. Nfh4 Nxg6 20. Nxg6 Ba6 21. Bd2 Qc4 22. Re1 Qxa2 23. Nh8+ Kf8 24. Qg6 Rxh8 25. Qxg7+ Ke8 26. Rxe6+ Kd8 27. Rxd6+ Kc8 28. Rc6+ Kd8 29. Qc7+ Ke8 30. Re6+ Kf8 31. Qg7# 1-0
- Paul Lipke vs. Emanuel Schiffers, Leipzig 1894: 1. d4 d5 2. e3 Nf6 3. Bd3 e6 4. Nd2 c5 5. c3 Nc6 6. f4 Be7 7. Nh3 O-O 8. Ng5 h6 9. h4 cxd4 10. exd4 Qd6 11. Ndf3 hxg5 12. hxg5 Ne4 13. Bxe4 dxe4 14. Ne5 Bxg5 15. fxg5 Nxe5 16. Qh5 f6 17. g6 Nxg6 18. Qxg6 Rf7 19. Be3 b5 20. O-O-O Kf8 21. d5 exd5 22. b4 Qe6 23. Rh7 Bb7 24. Bc5+ Ke8 25. Rxg7 Rc8 26. Rh1 1-0
- F.J. Lee vs. Arthur Mackenzie, Hastings 1904: 1. d4 d5 2. e3 Nf6 3. Bd3 e6 4. f4 c5 5. c3 Nc6 6. Nf3 a6 7. Nbd2 Qc7 8. Ne5 b5 9. O-O Bd6 10. Ndf3 h6 11. Nxc6 Qxc6 12. Ne5 Qc7 13. Bd2 Bb7 14. a4 c4 15. Bc2 O-O 16. Rf3 Ne4 17. Be1 Kh7 18. Rh3 f6 19. Nf3 Rad8 20. Nd2 e5 21. fxe5 fxe5 22. Bh4 Rde8 23. axb5 axb5 24. Qh5 g6 25. Qxh6+ Kxh6 26. Bf6# 1-0
