= Ellen Gilbert =

American chess player (1837–1900)

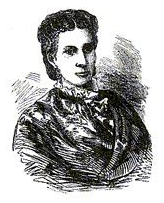
- Gilbert in 1877

Personal information
- Born: Ellen E. Strong Gilbert; April 30, 1837 Leverett, Massachusetts
- Died: February 12, 1900 (aged 62) Hartford, Connecticut

Chess career
- Country: United States

Ellen E. Gilbert (née Strong) (April 30, 1837 – February 12, 1900) was a strong 19th century correspondence chess player, and one of the first significant women players in chess history. She became famous for her match victory against George H. D. Gossip. Gossip, who had won the 1873–74 correspondence chess tournament of the Chess-Players Chronicle, "was thought by some to be the strongest correspondence player known". Gilbert, playing first board for the United States in an 1879 correspondence chess match against England, won all four of her games against Gossip. This enabled the American team to win the match 27–23. Her victories, combined with her announcing mate in 21 moves in one game, and mate in 35 moves in another, "caused a sensation in the chess world". She was hailed as "The Queen of Chess", and poems and at least one chess problem (with the pieces in the shape of a "Q") were composed in her honor. Her games were analyzed by Wilhelm Steinitz, the first World Champion, who confirmed the accuracy of her analyses. Gossip responded gallantly, dedicating his book Theory of the Chess Openings to her.

Unfortunately, this proved to be not only the high point of her chess career, but almost its end. Apart from playing one move in a "circulating game" in 1883, her victory against Gossip is the last known event in her career. Her obituary mentions "loss of sight" in "late years", and her vision may have already been declining when she played Gossip.

She died on February 12, 1900, in Hartford, Connecticut.

== Notable games ==
Gilbert vs. Gossip, England–United States correspondence chess match, 1879
1. e4 e5 2. Nf3 Nc6 3. Bb5 a6 4. Ba4 Nf6 5. 0-0 Nxe4 6. Re1 Nc5 7. Bxc6 dxc6 8. Nxe5 Be7 9. d4 Ne6 10. Be3 0-0 11. Nc3 f6 12. Nd3 f5 13. Ne2 Bd6 14. f4 b5? 15. Rc1 Bb7 16. c4 bxc4 17. Nc5 Bc8 18. Rxc4 Rb8 19. b3 Qf6 20. Qd3 Qg6 21. Ra4 Nxc5 22. dxc5 Be7 23. Nd4 Kh8 24. Qc2 Bh4 25. Bf2 Bxf2+ 26. Qxf2 Re8 27. Nf3 Bb7 28. Ne5 Qe6 29. Rc4 Rbd8 30. Rc3 Qf6 31. Rce3 Rf8 32. Qe2 Rd4 33. Qh5 g6 34. Qh6 Rdd8 35. Rh3 Qg7 (diagram)

Position: d8 black rook, f8 black rook, h8 black king, b7 black bishop, c7 black pawn, g7 black queen, h7 black pawn, a6 black pawn, c6 black pawn, g6 black pawn, h6 white queen, c5 white pawn, e5 white knight, f5 black pawn, f4 white pawn, b3 white pawn, h3 white rook, a2 white pawn, g2 white pawn, h2 white pawn, e1 white rook, g1 white king

Position after 35...Qg7

Gilbert now announced mate in 21: 36.Nxg6+ Kg8 37.Qxg7+ Kxg7 38.Nxf8 Rxf8 39.Re7+ Rf7 40.Rxh7+ Kxh7 41.Rxf7+ Kg6 42.Rxc7 Ba8 43.Ra7 Bb7 44.Rxb7 Kf6 45.h4 Kg6 46.Rc7 Kf6 47.Rxc6+ Ke7 48.h5 Kd7 49.Rg6 Ke7 50.c6 a5 51.c7 Kd7 52.h6 Kxc7 53.h7 a4 54.h8=Q axb3 55.Qh7+ Kd8 56.Rg8#
