= Carl Franz van der Velde =

German author of historical novels

Carl Franz van der Velde (27 September 1779 – 6 April 1824) was a German author of historical novels.

He was born in Breslau, Silesia (now Wrocław, Poland) into a Huguenot family. His father was the Stempelrendant (stamp accountant) Johann van der Velde and his mother was Beata Rosina van der Velde (née Gartschok). He worked as a municipal judge and published his novels serially in the newspaper Dresdner Abendzeitung. Most of them were historical, but Das Liebhaber-Theater (1823) began a vogue for humoresques.

He was married to Philippine Wilhelmine Elisabeth Schleyer (d. 1856), and they had one daughter, Bertha (1809–1834), and two sons, Arnold (1806–1882) and Otto (d. 1841).

His collected works were published in 25 volumes from 1819 to 1827. He died at the age of 44 and his last two works were published posthumously. Several were translated into English by Nathaniel Greene, as well as George Soane, Adolf Zytogorski, and Charles Augustus Feiling.

== Works ==
- Der Flibustier, 1818
- Prinz Friedrich. Eine Erzählung aus der ersten Hälfte des achtzehnten Jahrhunderts, Arnoldische Buchhandlung : Dresden 1820
- Die Eroberung von Mexiko. Ein historisch-romantisches Gemälde aus dem ersten Viertel des sechzehnten Jahrhunderts, Arnoldische Buchhandlung: Dresden 1821
- Die Lichtensteiner. Eine Erzählung aus den Zeiten des dreißigjährigen Krieges, Arnold: Dresden 1822
- Die Wiedertäufer. Eine Erzählung aus der ersten Hälfte des sechszehnten Jahrhunderts, Arnold: Dresden 1822
- Der Maltheser. Eine Erzählung aus der letzten Hälfte des siebzehnten Jahrhunderts, Arnoldische Buchhandlung: Dresden 1822
- Arwed Gyllenstierna. Eine Erzählung aus dem Anfange des achtzehnten Jahrhunderts, Arnoldische Buchhandlung: Dresden 1823
- Die Patrizier. Eine Erzählung aus dem letzten Drittel des sechszehnten Jahrhunderts, nach alten Urkunden, Arnold: Dresden 1823
- Der böhmische Mägdekrieg. Ein Nachtstück aus dem zweiten Viertel des achtzehnten Jahrhunderts, Arnold: Dresden 1824
- Christine und ihr Hof. Eine Erzählung aus der letzten Hälfte des siebenzehnten Jahrhunderts, Arnold: Dresden 1824 (zuvor in der Abend-Zeitung, 1823, Nr. 263-299 veröffentlicht)
- Die Gesandtschaftsreise nach China. Eine Erzählung aus der letzten Hälfte des achtzehnten Jahrhunderts, Arnold: Dresden 1825
- Das Horoskop. Eine Erzählung aus der Zeit der innern Kriege Frankreichs. Nach einer wahren Begebenheit aus der Gottfriedschen Chronik, Arnold: Dresden 1825

== Bibliography ==
- Eke, Norbert Otto and Olasz-Eke, Dagmar: Bibliographie: Der deutsche Roman 1815-1830. Standortnachweise, Rezensionen, Forschungsüberblick, Fink, München 1994, 454 S. (= Corvey Studien. Zur Literatur- und Kulturgeschichte des 19. Jahrhunderts 3)
- Geils, Peter and Gorzny, Willi (Hrsg.): Gesamtverzeichnis des deutschsprachigen Schrifttums (GV), 1700-1910, Saur, München u.a. 1979. 150/158
- Goetze, Edmund: Grundriß zur Geschichte der Deutschen Dichtung. Aus den Quellen. Von Karl Goedeke. Zehnter Band. Vom Weltfrieden bis zur französischen Revolution 1830, Achtes Buch. Dritte Abteilung. Zweite ganz neu bearbeitete Auflage ed. Ehlermann, Dresden 1913, 684 S.
- Kosch, Wilhelm: Deutsches Literatur-Lexikon. Biographisches und bibliographisches Handbuch, 2. Aufl., Francke, Bern 1949
- Matthey, Walther: Die historischen Erzählungen des Carl Franz van der Velde (1779-1824), Kohlhammer, Stuttgart 1928
