= Church of St John the Baptist, Bisbrooke =

Church in Bisbrooke, Rutland

Coordinates: 52°35′13″N 0°41′31″W

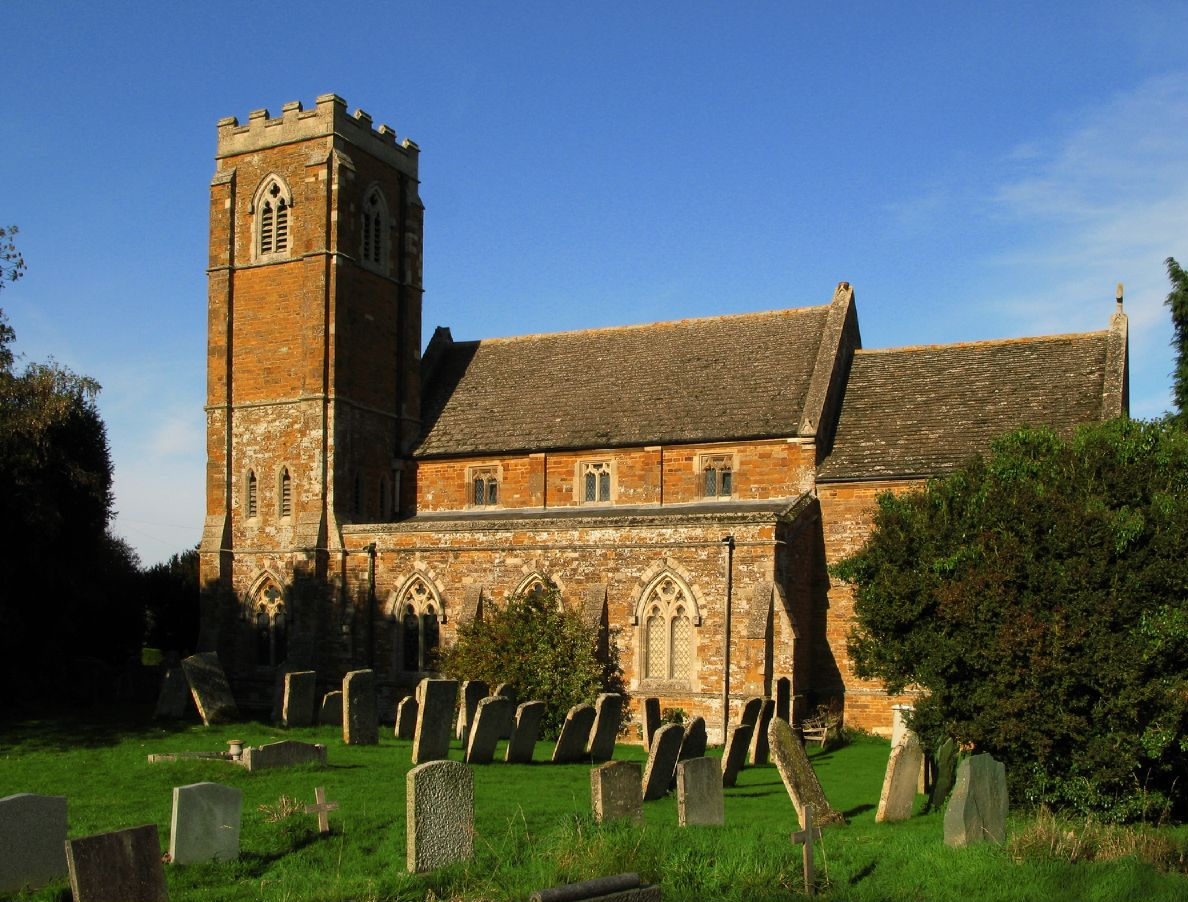
- St John the Baptist Church from the south east
- Church of St John the Baptist, Bisbrooke
- Denomination: Church of England

History
- Dedication: St John the Baptist

Administration
- Diocese: Peterborough
- Archdeaconry: Oakham
- Parish: Bisbrooke, Rutland

Clergy
- Vicar: Jane Baxter

The Church of St John the Baptist is a Church of England parish church in Bisbrooke, Rutland. A Victorian building, it is Grade II listed.

== History ==
The present church was built in 1871, replacing a small medieval building. The tower was only completed in 1914. It was listed Grade II in 1955.It has been restored in recent years so it can be used as a community hall. The old wooden parish chest can be seen in the chancel.

There are a number of fine gravestones in the churchyard, which pre-date the present building. The gravestone of Nathaniel Clark (died 1813), features a carving of four horses pulling a farm waggon, and to the side, is the waggoner with a whip and hat. The headstone is also Grade II listed.

== Clergy ==
Biblical textual critic Samuel Thomas Bloomfield was vicar here from 1814 until his death in 1869. Chess player George Alcock MacDonnell was vicar, 1887–99.
