= Josef Kling =

German chess master and chess composer

Josef Kling

Josef Kling (19 March 1811 – 1 December 1876), also found in English-language sources as Joseph Kling, was a German chess master and chess composer. He has been called "a pioneer of the modern style of chess." Although Kling was an expert on endgames and problems, he rarely played competitively.

Kling wrote several studies of the game. He co-edited the problem book Chess Studies (1851) with Bernhard Horwitz. From January 1851 to December 1853, the pair also co-edited the weekly journal The Chess Player, also known as The New Chess Player. As co-authors, they made notable contributions to endgame theory, and are thought to have originated the term "cook" in reference to "an unsound chess problem having two solutions."

Position: d8 white rook, f7 black king, d6 white king, d5 white pawn, d1 black rook

The Kling and Horwitz Defensive Technique enables Black to force a draw with Black to move.

Kling began as a teacher of instrumental music, but in the early 1850s found himself with few students. He emigrated from Mainz, Germany, to England, where in 1852 he opened a coffee house with chess rooms, located at 454 New Oxford Street in London. He occasionally employed Horwitz as a resident professional player there.

From 1859 to 1862, Kling revived the Chess Player's Chronicle with Adolf Zytogorski and Ignatz Kolisch, which had been discontinued by Robert Barnett Brien in 1856.

The Kling and Horwitz Defensive Technique enables Black to force a draw with Black to move against perfect play in the diagram shown to the right. For a detailed analysis of this position, see here.
