= Bisbrooke =

Village and civil parish in Rutland, England

Coordinates: 52.59°N 0.69°W

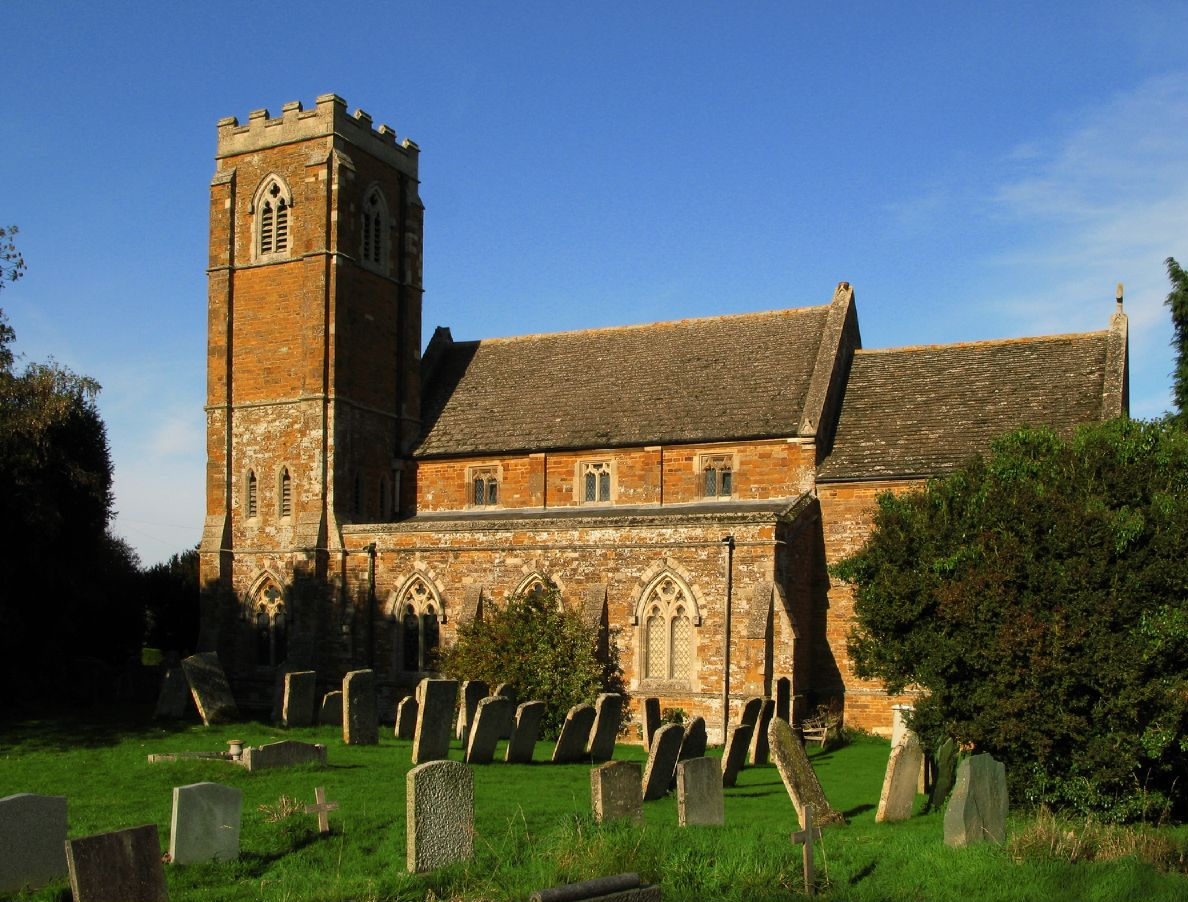
- St John the Baptist Church

- Location within Rutland
- Area: 1.8 sq mi (4.7 km^{2})
- Population: 211 2001 Census
  - Density: 117/sq mi (45/km^{2})
- OS grid reference: SP886996
  - London: 79 miles (127 km) SSE
- Unitary authority: Rutland
- Shire county: Rutland
- Ceremonial county: Rutland
- Region: East Midlands
- Country: England
- Sovereign state: United Kingdom
- Post town: OAKHAM
- Postcode district: LE15
- Dialling code: 01572
- Police: Leicestershire
- Fire: Leicestershire
- Ambulance: East Midlands
- UK Parliament: Rutland and Stamford

Bisbrooke is a village and civil parish in the county of Rutland in the East Midlands of England. The village is situated about 2 miles (3.2 km) east of Uppingham, south of the A47 road which passes through the parish. In 2001, it had a population of 219, falling to 204 at the 2011 census.

== History ==
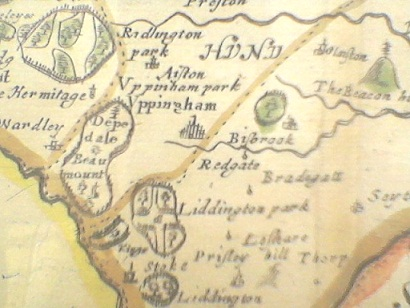
Bisbrooke, England in 1673

The village's name origin is dubious. Possibly, 'beetle brook' or 'brook of Bitel'.

Bisbrooke was first recorded in the Domesday Book of 1086 then spelt "Bitlesbroch". Over the centuries the spelling has gone through as many as 19 name changes including Bitelesbroke, Pysbroke and Butlisbroke before the present spelling was adopted. At the time of the Norman survey, about half of the land was owned by King William and the rest by Countess Judith of Fotheringhay in Northamptonshire.

Following the dissolution of the monasteries in the sixteenth century, in 1547 the land was granted by King Edward VI to Sir Richard Lee who soon afterwards settled it on Anthony Andrews. The land was still in the Andrews family nearly a century later with Bisbrooke or Pisbroke as it was then spelled, being owned by Anthony's great-grandson Edward, Sheriff of Rutland. In the English Civil War Edward initially supported King Charles but afterwards embraced the Parliamentarians’ cause. Fined for his earlier Royalist tendencies, he seemed to have been unable to meet his debts and his land was sold.

The Bisbrooke estate was acquired during the Commonwealth by Sir George Manners (father of John Manners, 8th Earl of Rutland) and so, most of Bisbrooke passed into the Duke of Rutland's Belvoir Estate. The estate was divided and auctioned in 1918.

In the 1950s, "small-holdings, orchards and vegetable patches jostle each other in the sheltered hollows of Bisbrooke” where “almost everyone grows and sells strawberries”; much of the fruit was sent for jam-making.

== Notable buildings ==
The parish church of St John the Baptist dates from 1871 in its present form, though the tower was only finished in 1914. It was listed Grade II in 1955. There are a number of fine gravestones, which pre-date the present building. Biblical textual critic Samuel Thomas Bloomfield was vicar here from 1814 until his death in 1869 and chess player George Alcock MacDonnell was vicar, 1887–99.

Ruby D'Arcy serving at The Gate, Bisbrooke, in 2008

Bisbrooke Hall is to the north of the A47 within the parish boundary but actually nearer to the village of Glaston. The Hall was substantially remodelled and extended by Lord Carbery around 1840.

The village pub, the Gate was run by Ruby D'Arcy from 1968 to 2012 and many a schoolboy from Uppingham School (Stephen Fry, Rick Stein, Jonathan Agnew, and Johnny Vaughan among them) supposedly slipped across the fields from Uppingham to relax, away from their masters’ watchful gaze. Ruby's husband Peter D'Arcy was spoken of with affection and when he died, 1,500 mourners attended his funeral in Bisbrooke church. The pub did not re-open after Ruby D'Arcy's death and has been converted as a private house.

The village was too unremarkable to warrant an entry in Arthur Mee's The King's England volume.
