= Peter Lee (chess player) =

British chess player

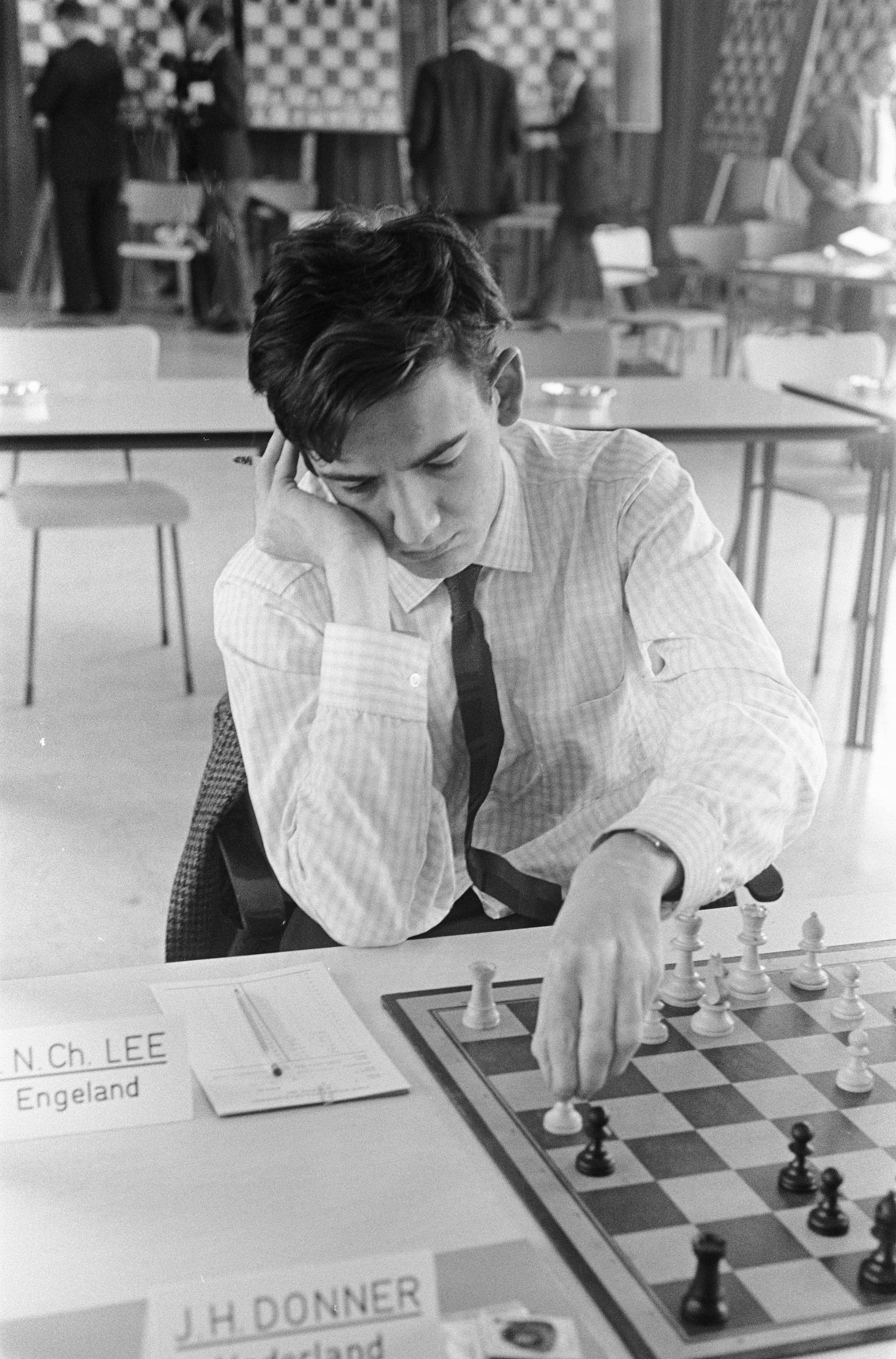
- Peter Lee (1966)

Personal information
- Born: 21 November 1943 (age 82) London, England

Chess career
- Country: England
- Title: FIDE Master (2021)
- Peak rating: 2390 (July 1971)

Peter Nicholas Lee (born 21 November 1943) is an English chess player who won the British Chess Championship in 1965 at the age of 21, at the time the youngest ever British Champion. Born in London and educated at Exeter College, Oxford, he represented Oxford University in the Varsity chess matches of 1963, 1964, 1965, and 1966, and represented England in the Chess Olympiads of 1966, 1968, and 1970.

He has also played at a high level in contract bridge. He has won the English Bridge Union's National Pairs title seven times, the first time in 2003, and has also been a member of the team that won the Gold Cup, the premier teams event in Britain, in 2003 and 2011. He also has the highest recorded mature grade in the English Bridge Union National Grading Scheme, reaching 75.06 in May 2012.

He is the only person who has won British championships in both chess and bridge.

As a consultant in medical statistics and epidemiology, he has also published over 300 papers, many on the effects of tobacco on health.
