= Adolf Zytogorski =

Polish-British chess master and translator

Adolf Żytogórski
Personal information
- Born: c. 1811/1812 Translyvania
- Died: 28 February 1882 (aged 69–75) London, England

Chess career
- Country: Poland and England

Adolf Żytogórski (or Adolph Zytogorski, [Żɨtɔɡurski], later known as John Hanstein) (c. 1811/1812 – 28 February 1882) (Note: Many sources give his date of birth as 1806 or 1807, based on his obituary in the British Chess Magazine which states his age as being 75 years at his death. Chess historian Tim Harding points out the inaccuracy of the obituary, and suggests that 1811 or 1812 is most likely, based on his census records and death certificate.) was a Polish-British chess master and translator.

== Biography ==
Details of Zytogorski's early life are sparse. He is usually said to have been born in 1806 or 1807 based on his obituary in the British Chess Magazine, but according to chess historian Tim Harding, around 1811 or 1812 is most likely, based on his census records and death certificate. Despite being Polish, he gave his place of birth on census records as Transylvania, which was part of the Austrian Empire at the time, leading Harding to speculate that he may have had one Polish and one Austrian parent.

Following the collapse of the Polish–Russian War in 1830–1831 (November Uprising), Zytogorski became a political refugee, and emigrated to England. His role in the uprising is unknown, but in 1837 he joined both the Union of Polish Emigration, and the Polish Democratic Society. During Nicholas I of Russia's 1844 visit to London, Zytogorski and other exiles petitioned the Emperor to be allowed to return to Poland. They were offered an amnesty on the condition that they first travelled to Russia to be examined for possible state crimes. Like many others, Zytogorski did not accept, and remained in England.

From about 1850 he adopted the surname Hanstein (possibly his mother's maiden name), though he kept using the name Zytogorski for chess.

Zytogorski died on 28 February 1882 in the German Hospital, Dalston, London. (Note: Many sources give his date of death as 27 February, based on his obituary in the British Chess Magazine, but his death certificate confirms that he died on 28 February.)

== Chess ==
Zytogorski was a frequent contributor to the Chess Player's Chronicle, and in 1841 carried out a thorough analysis of the Rook and bishop versus rook endgame, including a challenge that four starting positions could always be won, including one said by Giambattista Lolli to be a draw. Much of this work was included in Howard Staunton's Chess-Players' Handbook (1847) with analysis by Josef Kling, who showed that there was an error in Zytogorski's logic.

By 1851, Zytogorski appears to have fallen out with Staunton, and did not play in the St. George's Club tournament that Staunton organised that year. William Wayte suggested that this was because Staunton had suppressed all mention of Zytogorski in the Chess Player's Chronicle and the Illustrated London News. Robert Barnett Brien took over from Staunton as editor of the Chess Player's Chronicle in 1854, and soon afterwards also seems to have fallen out with Staunton. In 1855, Brien published a claim that Zytogorski had beaten Staunton 6–0 in 1843, at Staunton's usual odds of pawn and two moves. However, with no independent evidence to support this claim, and considering their relative strength at the time, it is considered very unlikely by chess historians such as Philip Walsingham Sergeant and Tim Harding.

Zytogorski won a match against Franciscus Janssens (6–4) in 1854. In 1855, he took second behind Ernst Falkbeer and ahead of Brien (Triangular), and won at London (Kling's Coffee House). In 1856, he lost to Valentine Green (7–8) (Zytogorski gave odds of pawn and move), and played in semifinals at London (McDonnell Chess Club). He lost to Ignatz Kolisch at Cambridge 1860 (semifinal).

From 1859 to 1862, Zytogorski, Ignatz Kolisch, and Josef Kling revived the Chess Player's Chronicle, which had been discontinued by Brien in 1856. Zytogorski's role is not clear, but in 1861 it was reported that it would "henceforth be edited by Herr Kolisch conjointly with its late manager Mr. Zytogorski".

== Bibliography ==
As editor:

- Chess Player's Chronicle (1859–1862)

As translator:

- Select Popular Tales from the German of Musaeus (1845) (anonymous) by Johann Karl August Musäus
- The Enchanted Knights; or The Chronicle of the Three Sisters (1845) (anonymous) by Johann Karl August Musäus
- The Nymph of the Well and The Barber's Ghost (1848) (as Adolphus Zytogorski) by Johann Karl August Musäus
- Libussa, Duchess of Bohemia; also The Man Without a Name (1852) (as Adolphus Zytogorski, later reissued as J. T. Hanstein) by Johann Karl August Musäus
- Oswald Dorn (1856) (as J. F. Hanstein) by Carl Franz van der Velde
- The Immaculate Conception (1857) (as J. F. Hanstein) by Edmond de Pressensé
- The Captain's Daughter (1859) (as J. F. Hanstein) by Alexander Sergeyevich Pushkin
- Popular Works of Musæus (1865) (as J. T. Hanstein) by Johann Karl August Musäus
- The Chronicle of the Three Sisters, and Mute Love (1866) (as J. T. Hanstein) by Johann Karl August Musäus
