= Edmund Goetze =

German literary historian and philologist

Edmund Goetze (26 September 1843, Dresden – 18 June 1920, Dresden) was a German literary historian and philologist.

He studied philology and archaeology at the University of Leipzig (1864–1868), where his instructors were Georg Curtius, Friedrich Wilhelm Ritschl, Johannes Overbeck and Friedrich Zarncke. He spent most of his career at the Kadettenhaus in the Wackerbarth-Palais in Dresden, serving as a professor (1871–1895) and as a director (1895–1909).

He was editor of various works composed by the 16th century meistersinger, Hans Sachs. After the death of Göttingen professor, Karl Goedeke, he edited "Grundriss zur Geschichte der deutschen Dichtung aus den Quellen" (Outline on the history of German literature from its sources).

== Selected bibliography ==
- Hans Sachs: "Werke", edited by Adelbert von Keller, 26 volumes, Laupp, Tübingen (Drucker) 1870–1908.
  - Volume 13 (1880) and 14 (1882), edited by Keller and Goetze.
  - Volume 15 (1885) to 26 (1908), edited by Goetze.
- "Monographie über den Meistersänger Adam Puschman von Görlitz. Nebst Beiträgen zur Geschichte des deutschen Meistergesanges", 1877 – Monograph on the meistersinger Adam Puschman of Görlitz.
- Hans Sachs: "Sämtliche Fastnachtspiele" (All carnival games) in chronological order according to the originals, 7 volumes, Niemeyer, Halle an der Saale 1880–1887.
- "Hans Sachs", by Edmund Goetze; drawings by Peter Halm, Bamberg : Buchner, 1890.
- "Grundriss zur Geschichte der deutschen Dichtung aus den Quellen", by Karl Goedeke. (Second, brand new edition. volumes 4–10; After the death of the author, in conjunction with specialist scholars, continued by Edmund Goetze. Ehlermann, Dresden 1891–1913.
- "Goethe und Hans Sachs", 1895.
- Hans Sachs: "Sämtliche Fabeln und Schwänke" (All fables and anecdotes) edited by Edmund Goetze and Carl Drescher, Niemeyer, Halle an der Saale, 1913.
- "Ein Volks-Fest im Schwarzwald Großes Festspiel", 1920.
