= Karl Goedeke =

German literary historian (1814–1887)

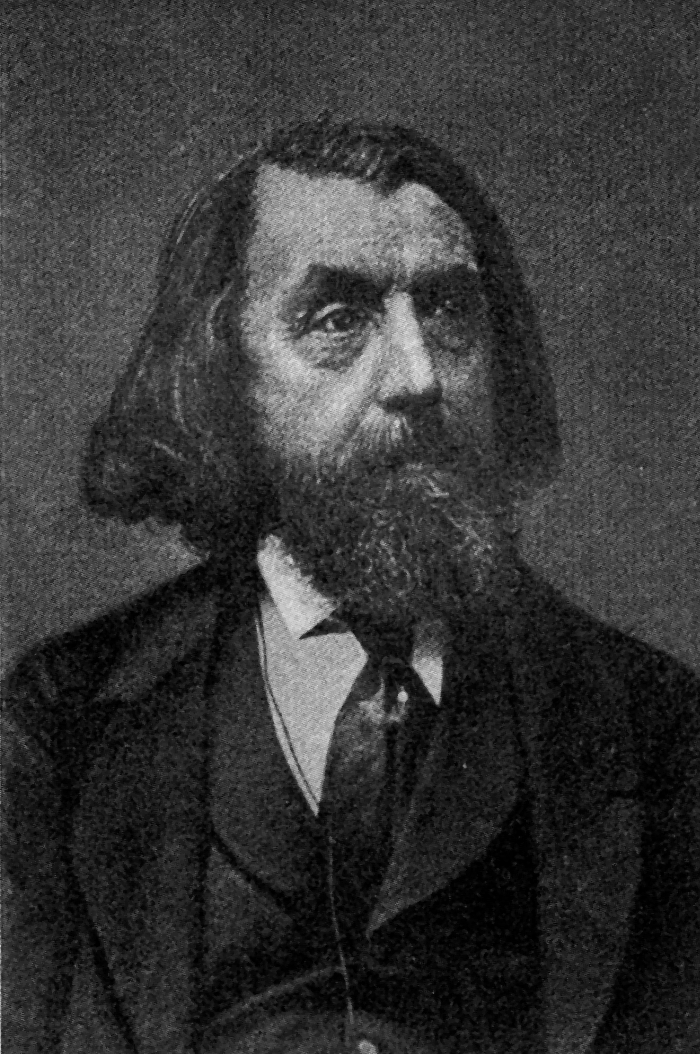
Karl Goedeke

Karl Friedrich Ludwig Goedeke (15 April 1814 – 28 October 1887) was a German historian of literature, an author, and a professor.

He was born at Celle and was educated at Göttingen (1833-1838), where he attended lectures by Jacob Grimm, with whom he maintained a lifelong friendship. From 1841 to 1855, he lived and worked in Hannover, and from 1873 until his death, was a professor at the University of Göttingen.

After writing several novels and the drama "König Kodrus, eine Missgeburt der Zeit", under the pseudonym "Karl Stahl", he devoted himself to critical and biographical literature. His publications include:

- Deutschlands Dichter von 1813 bis 1843 (1844).
- Elf Bücher deutscher Dichtung von Sebastian Brant bis auf die Gegenwart (1849).
- Deutsche Dichtung im Mittelalter (second edition, 1871).
- Grundriss zur Geschichte der deutschen Dichtung (third edition, under the editorship of Edmund Goetze, 1910 et seq.), his principal work.
- He also wrote biographies of Lessing, Goethe, and Schiller.

== Publications ==
- Schreck, Karl Goedeke (1894)
