= Charles Ranken =

British chess master and clergyman

Charles Edward Ranken

Personal information
- Born: Charles Edward Ranken; 5 January 1828 Brislington, England
- Died: 12 April 1905 (aged 77) Malvern, England

Chess career
- Country: England
- Title: Master

Charles Edward Ranken (5 January 1828 – 12 April 1905) was a Church of England clergyman and a minor British chess master. He co-founded and was the first president of the Oxford University Chess Club. He was also the editor of the Chess Player's Chronicle and a writer for the British Chess Magazine. Ranken is best known today as the co-author of Chess Openings Ancient and Modern (1889), one of the first important opening treatises in the English language.

== Education and religious career ==
Ranken was born in Brislington, near Bristol, on 5 January 1828, son of Rev. Charles Ranken Sr. He learned chess at age 12, but first made a serious study of the game while attending Wadham College, Oxford University in 1847–50. He particularly devoted himself to study of Howard Staunton's The Chess-Player's Handbook (1847), a book that he said "marked the beginning of a new era in English chess literature".

In 1867, Ranken became vicar at Sandford-on-Thames and lived at Oxford. He and Lord Randolph Churchill (Winston Churchill's father) founded the Oxford University Chess Club in April 1869, with Ranken becoming its first president. In 1871, he resigned his vicarage and moved to Malvern, England, where he remained for the rest of his life.

== Family ==
Ranken's wife, Louisa Jane, died on 10 February 1903. Census records reflect that she was born in Pendleton, Greater Manchester, was 14 years Ranken's junior, and that they married sometime between 1861 and 1871, and had at least three children: daughters Francis (born c. 1871) and Emily (born c. 1876), and son Herbert (born c. 1878). Ranken died at Malvern on 12 April 1905. His executors were named as Arthur William Ranken and Edward Ranken.

== Chess tournament career ==
Ranken was a leading member of a group of clerics who played a prominent role in early Victorian Era English chess. In addition to Ranken, these included the Reverend George Alcock MacDonnell, John Owen, William Wayte, Edmund Thorold and Arthur Skipworth. Mike Fox and Richard James remark that, "The English parsons were a talented mob; presumably quiet country parishes in the nineteenth century gave one the leisure needed to become a star." However, Philip Sergeant in his book A Century of British Chess writes that, "In chess he was one of the writing rather than the fighting clergy, and his delight lay most in analysis".

Despite Sergeant's characterization, Ranken played in a number of tournaments in Britain between 1851 and 1895. After leaving Oxford, he played in the provincial section of the great London 1851 tournament, finished second behind Samuel Boden. By 1859, the Chess Player's Chronicle ranked him the best English player outside London. He played in many congresses organized by the Counties Chess Association. His best result was in 1872, when he finished first in the first-class section at the 8th British Counties Chess Association Congress in Malvern with 12 of 14 possible points, ahead of Revs. Thorold (11.5 points) and Wayte (10.5 points). He had another excellent performance in 1881, when he won the 16th British Counties Chess Association Congress in Leamington, scoring 8 of 9 possible points, ahead of Revs. Owen (7.5 points) and Wayte (7 points). In 1877, he won the Counties Chess Association handicap tournament at Birmingham.

At the 1883 London Vizayanagaram minor tournament, Ranken "started well but his health gave way after the first week". He still scored 17.5 of 25 possible points, tying for 5th–6th out of 26 players with George H. D. Gossip. Curt von Bardeleben won with 21.5 points; Isidor Gunsberg, who would narrowly lose an 1890–91 World Championship match to Wilhelm Steinitz, finished fourth with 19 points.

The strongest tournament in which Ranken played was the Master Tournament at Hereford 1885, an 11-player tournament that featured some of the world's leading players. Ranken scored 3 of 10 possible points, tying for 8th–10th with William Pollock and Thorold. Joseph Henry Blackburne won with 8 points, followed by Henry Bird and Emil Schallopp (7.5 points), George Henry Mackenzie (7 points), and Gunsberg and James Mason (5.5 points).

Ranken also participated in several correspondence chess matches and took first place in the British Chess Association's 1872 competition.

== Chess writing ==
Chess Openings Ancient and Modern, first (1889) and third (1896) editions

Ranken and Wayte assisted Skipworth, the chief editor, in writing The Chess Players' Quarterly Chronicle, which was published in York from February 1868 to December 1871. Ranken was also a contributor to the similarly named The Chess Player's Chronicle, whose editor-in-chief was J. Jenkin of Helensburgh, which ran from January to March 1875 and was billed as a "monthly record of provincial chess" and published at Glasgow. It was revived in January 1876, with Ranken as its editor-in-chief, and ran until September 1880. In its pages in 1879, he analyzed 1.e4 e5 2.Nf3 Nc6 3.Nc3 Nf6 4.Bb5 a6 5.Bxc6, a favorable variation for White in the Four Knights Game, which was named the Ranken Variation after him.

Ranken next became a member of the staff of the British Chess Magazine (BCM), which began publication in January 1881 under the editorship of John Watkinson. There, Ranken specialized in analysis of the opening, middlegame and endgame. For example, the March 1898 issue featured his analysis of the Rice Gambit. In 1897, the BCM published his article Chess Reminiscences in the Victorian Era, in which he wrote, "With great defects he had great virtues; there was nothing mean, cringing, or small in his nature, and, taking him all in all, England never had a more worthy chess representative than Howard Staunton."

Ranken is remembered today as the co-author, with Edward Freeborough, of the opening treatise Chess Openings Ancient and Modern, a precursor of Modern Chess Openings. The first edition of the book was published in 1889. Later editions were published in 1893, 1896, and 1910. It was one of the first opening books written in columnar form: columns of move-sequences thought to constitute best play, presented in chess notation and concluding with a symbol indicating the analyst's assessment of the final position (such as "equal", "White wins", or "advantage to Black"). The book also set forth a number of general principles, many of which are still valid today.

Even modern grandmasters study the book. Frank Brady wrote in his biography of World Champion Bobby Fischer that Chess Openings Ancient and Modern was one of the most heavily annotated books in Fischer's personal library. Fischer had pencilled in his own analyses of the Scotch Game, Giuoco Piano, Evans Gambit, Bishop's Gambit, Danish Gambit, and other openings. Specifically referring to the analysis in Chess Openings Ancient and Modern, Grandmaster Robert Byrne wrote in a 1991 New York Times chess column, "Ingenious strategies and tactics were tried out in the old days, and if your opponent knows them and you don't, you are in for a pounding." Likewise Fischer, in his famous book My 60 Memorable Games, annotating an Evans Gambit that he had won against Reuben Fine, cited analysis from the 1893 edition of Chess Openings Ancient and Modern as an improvement on Fine's ninth move.

== Notable games ==
Position: g1 white king, e1 white rook, h2 white rook, g3 white pawn, f3 black pawn, c3 white pawn, a3 white pawn, f4 white bishop, e4 black pawn, d5 black pawn, g6 black queen, c6 black pawn, b6 white pawn, g7 black pawn, g8 black king, e8 black rook

Wayte-Ranken 1885, position after 33.b6

Savielly Tartakower and Julius du Mont call the following game, played in 1885 between William Wayte (playing White) and Ranken, "One of many fine games played between the two reverend gentlemen, but a particularly thrilling one."
1.e4 e5 2.Nf3 Nc6 3.c3 Nf6 4.d4 Nxe4 5.d5 Bc5!? A speculative piece sacrifice. Either 5...Ne7 or 5...Nb8 leads to equal play. 6.dxc6 Bxf2+ 6...Nxf2 7.Qd5 is strong for White. 7.Ke2 d5!? Not mentioned in MCO-15, which gives only 7...bxc6. MCO-15 and Tartakower and du Mont agree that in that event 8.Qa4 f5 9.Nbd2 leaves Black with inadequate compensation for the sacrificed piece. 8.cxb7 Bxb7 9.Qa4+ c6 10.Nbd2 f5 11.Nxe4 fxe4 12.Kxf2 0-0 13.Be3 gxf3 14.g3 After 14.gxf3 e4, "White's troubles are only beginning". 14...Qc8 15.Bc5 Rf6 16.Rd1 a5 17.Rd2 Ba6 18.Bxa6 Qxa6 19.Re1 e4 20.a3? The immediate 20.b4 would leave White "better able to weather the storm". 20...Qc8 21.Kg1 Qh3 22.b4 Re8 23.Qxa5 h5 24.Qa6 h4 25.Qf1 Qg4 26.Qf2 Rg6 27.b5? The only possible defense was 27.Kh1 hxg3 Qxg3. Now Black has a crushing attack. 27...hxg3 28.hxg3 28.Qxg3 Qf5 wins White's queen. 28...Rh6 29.Be3 Rh3 30.Bf4 Qh5 31.Qh2 Rxh2 32.Rxh2 Qg6 33.b6 e3! A deflecting sacrifice. 34.Rxe3 Rxe3 35.Bxe3 Qxg3+ 36.Kh1 Qe1+ 37.Bg1 Qxc3 and Black won.

Position: h1 white rook, e1 white king, b1 white knight, a1 white rook, h2 white pawn, g2 white pawn, f2 white pawn, b2 white pawn, a2 white pawn, e3 white bishop, c3 white pawn, e4 black knight, e5 black queen, b5 black bishop, h7 black pawn, g7 black pawn, f7 black pawn, d7 black king, c7 black pawn, a7 black pawn, h8 black rook, f8 black bishop, a8 white queen

Wayte-Ranken 1890, position after 12.Be3

The same players in 1890 played another game with the same opening. It again featured speculative sacrificial play by Ranken, this time including a double rook sacrifice. 1.e4 e5 2.Nf3 Nc6 3.c3 Nf6 4.d4 d5 5.Bb5 Nxe4?! 6.Nex5 Bd7 7.Qb3 Nxe5 8.Qxd5! Qe7 9.Qxb7 Bxb5 10.Qxa8+ Kd7 11.dxe5?? Correct is 11.Qd5, keeping the advantage. Qxe5+ 12.Be3 Bc5! Sacrificing the second rook. 13.Qxh8 Nxf2! 14.Kd2 Bxe3+ 0-1

For another game between these players, see William Wayte.
