= Wackerbarth-Palais =

Destroyed palace in Dresden, Germany

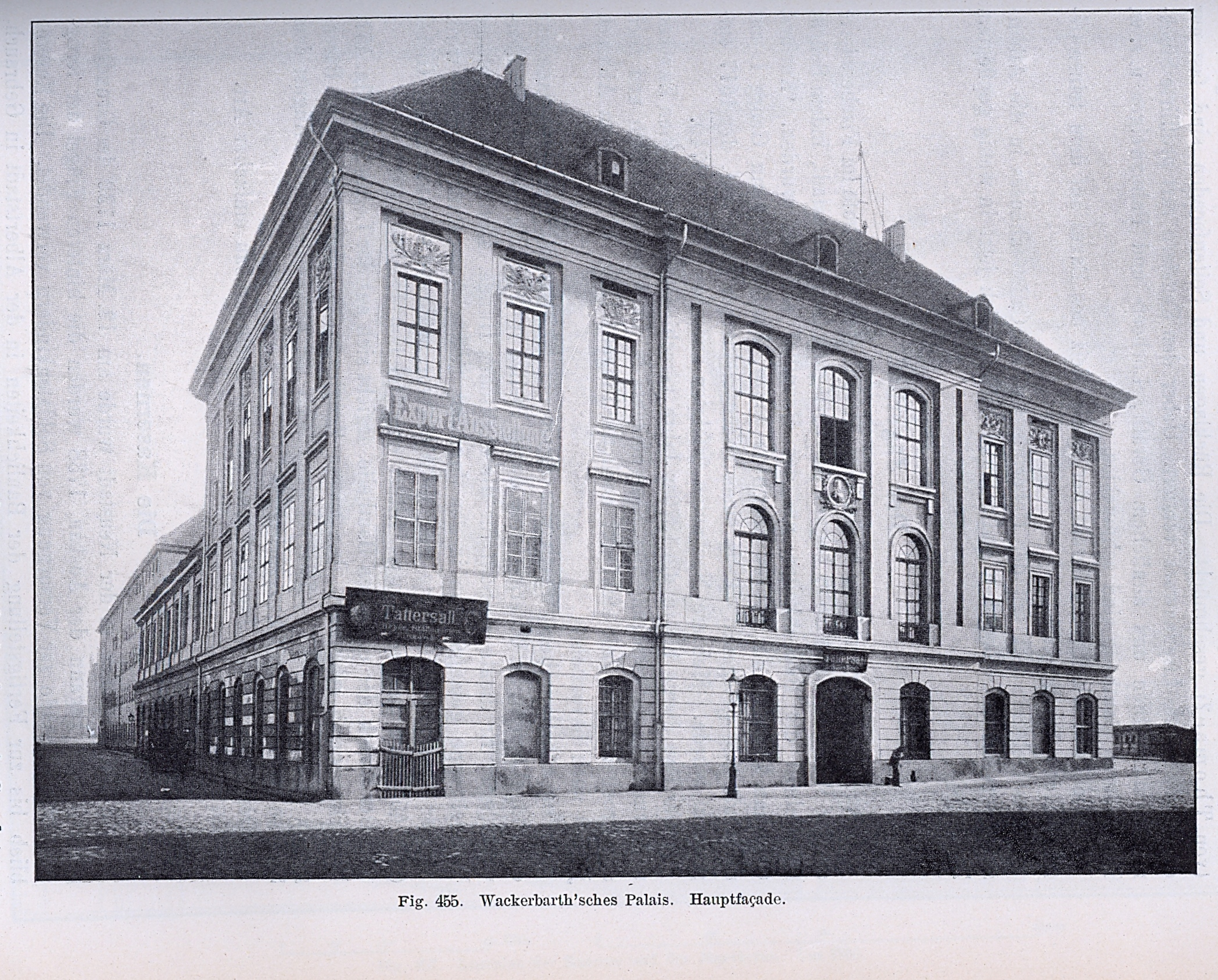
Picture of the Wackerbarth Palace

The Wackerbarth Palace, also known as the Dresdener Ritterakademie (German for "Knight Academy of Dresden"), was a palace in Dresden, Germany, built between 1723 and 1729, under the supervision of architect Johann Christoph Knöffel. It was one of the several Baroque palaces in Dresden which were destroyed during the allied bombing raids on February 13, 1945. It was named for Count August Christoph von Wackerbarth (1662-1734), a Saxon minister and Field Marshal. The palace was situated in the city, north of the Elbe river, at the former Beaumontplatz near Neustädter Markt.

Badly damaged during the Allied bombing raids, parts of it were still standing after the war. Reconstruction would have been possible, but it was demolished by the government of the German Democratic Republic (East Germany) in 1963. Presently there are no plans for a reconstruction project. However, a medallion with the image of Saxon King August the Strong, part of the facade ornaments made by famous Baroque sculptor Benjamin Thomae, was saved and is now part of the Johanneum.

On the other hand, other palaces in Dresden, such as the Zwinger, Japanisches Palais, Residenzschloss, Taschenbergpalais, Palais Cosel and the Kurländer Palace, all heavily damaged by the Allied raids, were reconstructed.
