= G. H. Diggle =

British chess player

Personal information
- Born: Geoffrey Harber Diggle; 6 December 1902 Moulton, Lincolnshire, England
- Died: 13 February 1993 (aged 90) Brighton, England

Chess career
- Country: England

Geoffrey Harber Diggle (6 December 1902 – 13 February 1993) was a British chess player and writer. Diggle contributed articles to the British Chess Magazine (BCM) from 1933 to 1981, and to the British Chess Federation's publications Newsflash and Chess Moves from 1974 to 1992. C.H.O'D. Alexander called Diggle "one of the best writers on chess that I know". In his A Book of Chess, Alexander reproduced in toto Diggle's account, first published in the November and December 1943 BCM, of the match between Staunton and St. Amant.

After Diggle told Alexander of a game he had lost in seven moves (1.e4 e5 2.Nc3 Nf6 3.Bc4 Nxe4 4.Bxf7+?! Kxf7 5.Nxe4 Nc6 6.Qf3+ Kg8?? 7.Ng5! 1-0 Davids-Diggle, London Banks League 1949), Alexander affectionately christened Diggle "the Badmaster", a facetious counterpoint to the more familiar title Grandmaster. Diggle later adopted the sobriquet as a pseudonym, writing a series of articles in Newsflash under that name between 1974 and 1986.

Chess historian Edward Winter wrote the following in his remembrance of Diggle in CHESS magazine:

Specializing in nineteenth-century chess history (particularly the Staunton period), he brought the old masters to life with rare wit and shrewdness. These qualities also permeated his accounts of the idiosyncratic doings and sayings of club "characters", such as the elderly player "who fumbled his way to perdition at reasonable speed until he was a queen and two minor pieces to the bad, after which he discovered that 'every move demanded the nicest calculation'", or "the Lincoln bottom board of 1922, who complained that he had 'lost his queen about the third move and couldn’t seem to get going after that'." A former county champion, G.H.D. was charmingly self-deprecatory in his reminiscences, as when he had a game adjudicated by Tartakower: "The Great Master, having been fetched, sat down at the board very simply and unaffectedly, and drank in through his spectacles the fruits (and probably the whole deplorable history) of the Badmaster’s afternoon strategy."

Little escaped G.H.D.'s eye, even towards the end. Modestly adapting Oscar Wilde, he claimed to have "nothing to declare but his longevity", simply adding that he had "mingled from time to time with three generations of eminent players ranging from Isidor Gunsberg to Nigel Short, and rambled extensively round the highways and byways of provincial chess". He was one of the game's most stylish chroniclers.

In 1984 and 1987, Chess Notes published two collections of Diggle's Newsflash articles as Chess Characters: Reminiscences of a Badmaster and Chess Characters: Reminiscences of a Badmaster, Volume II.
