= Chess Player's Chronicle =

English-language magazine about chess

The Chess Player's Chronicle, founded by Howard Staunton and extant in 1841–56 and 1859–62, was the world's first successful English-language magazine devoted exclusively to chess. Various unrelated but identically or similarly named publications were published until 1902.

Page from Chess Player's Chronicle in a style of descriptive notation

The earliest chess magazine in any language was the French Le Palamède, published in 1836–39 and 1842–47. In 1837 George Walker introduced an English-language magazine, the Philidorian, that was devoted to "chess and other scientific games". Only six issues of it were published, and it expired in May 1838.

The Chess Player's Chronicle became the first successful English-language chess magazine. In 1840 or 1841 Staunton bought the fortnightly magazine The British Miscellany and Chess Player's Chronicle. In 1841 it became the Chess Player's Chronicle. In 1843, the Chess Player's Chronicle became a shilling monthly magazine.

Staunton "made the inclusion of a large number of games by himself and other leading players of the day a special feature" of the magazine. He also used the magazine as a forum for attacking others. For example, in an early issue, he included the following in "Notices to Correspondents":

A Barrister, Temple.—Calls our attention to the ridiculous alteration of the Laws of Chess, by G. Walker, in his New Treatise on Chess, and asks, "Is it possible such absurdities are sanctioned by the London Chess Club?" The only sanction give to Walker's puerilities by the Committee is to laugh at them. His books on Chess are no authority except among the lowest class of players.

Staunton was the owner and editor of the magazine until the early 1850s, when he sold it to R.B. Brien. Brien became editor of the magazine, but was unable to continue its success and discontinued it in 1856 because of financial losses and his own illness. It reappeared in 1859 under the editorship of Ignatz Kolisch, Adolf Zytogorski, and Josef Kling, but survived only until July 1862.

Thereafter, a number of magazines appeared with the same or similar name appeared. Arthur Skipworth, assisted by William Wayte and Charles Ranken, wrote The Chess Players' Quarterly Chronicle, which was published in York from February 1868 to December 1871. Skipworth, who had left Bilsdale for Tetford Rectory, and John Wisker became the editors of the new The Chess Players' Chronicle in February 1872. Johann Löwenthal began writing for it in 1873. The magazine ran until 1875.

In January 1876, it was succeeded by The Chess Player's Chronicle, whose editor-in-chief was J. Jenkin of Helensburgh. Its editorial staff consisted of Jenkin, Skipworth, Ranken, Wayte, and Andrew Hunter of Glasgow. Billed as a "monthly record of provincial chess", it was published at Glasgow, costing sixpence. Its short run under Jenkin's editorship was marked by xenophobia. The February issue stated that the West End Club had "cleared away the disturbing foreign element which whilom infected the Divan" and referring to Wilhelm Steinitz as "the hot-headed little Austrian". Its third and last issue was published in March.

The magazine reappeared in January 1877. It was now under Ranken's editorship, assisted by J. Crum, G. B. Fraser, Skipworth, and Wayte. The first issue apologized for "certain offensive statements and insinuations, seriously affecting the honour of some eminent players", and explained that some members of the present editorial staff had only contributed games and other inoffensive material to it in 1875. Ranken continued to edit the magazine until September 1880. In 1881, the title was enlarged to The Chess Player's Chronicle, and Journal of Indoor and Outdoor Sports, and "the magazine's importance in the chess world was no longer the same".

None of these magazines compared in quality with what Staunton had achieved, and the success of the British Chess Magazine, by the turn of the century a superior publication, put an end to the title in 1902.
