= Francis Joseph Lee =

English chess player (1858-1909)

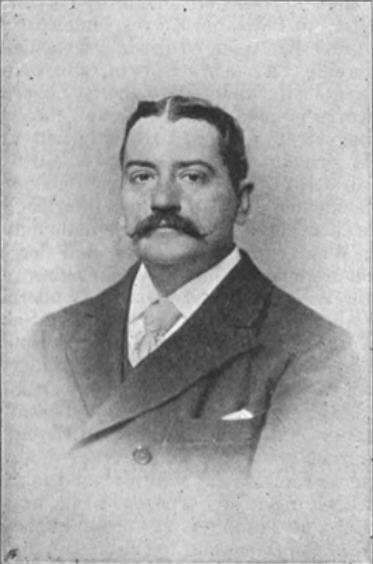

Personal information
- Born: Francis Joseph Lee; June 1858 London, England
- Died: 12 September 1909 (aged 51) London, England

Chess career
- Country: United Kingdom
- Title: Master

Francis Joseph Lee (June 1858 – 12 September 1909) was an English chess master.

== Chess career ==
Lee played in a number of matches, and British and international chess tournaments, between 1883 and 1907. In the Master Section of the 3rd British Chess Federation (BCF) Congress at London 1887 (won by Amos Burn and Isidor Gunsberg), he finished 6th out of 10 players, scoring 3.5 out of a possible 9 points. In the Master Section at the 4th BCF Championship at Bradford 1888 (won by Gunsberg), he finished 14th of 17 players, scoring 5 of a possible 16 points. In a tournament held at Simpson's Divan in London in 1888, he finished 9th of 18 players, scoring 9 out a possible 17 points. That same year, he lost a match to Gunsberg at Bradford, scoring just two draws in five games. In the Master Section of the 5th BCF Congress at London 1889, he finished 6th-8th of 11 players, scoring 5 out of a possible 10 points. In the Master Section of the 6th BCF Congress at Manchester 1890 (won by Siegbert Tarrasch), he finished 12th-13th out of 20, scoring 9 of a possible 19 points. In an 1890 match in London, Lee had what Chessmetrics considers his best result, losing a match to Joseph Henry Blackburne (2 wins, 6 draws, 6 losses).

Lee also lost matches to Emanuel Lasker (0.5 : 1.5) at London 1891, Richard Teichmann (3.5 : 5.5) at London 1898 and (2.5 : 5.5) at London 1901, and won two matches against Henry Bird (8 : 5 and 5 : 3) at London 1897. He also participated in two cable matches between England and the United States in 1901 and 1902.

Lee took 4th at Belfast 1892 (Quadrangular), shared 3rd at New York 1893 (Lasker won with a perfect score), tied for 10-11th at Barmen 1905 (B tournament, Leo Fleischmann won), and tied for 25-26th at Ostend 1907 chess tournament (Masters' Tournament, Ossip Bernstein and Akiba Rubinstein won).

Lee won the South African Chess Championship in 1903. He participated in British Chess Championships at Hastings 1904, Shrewsbury 1906, Tunbridge Wells 1908, and Scarborough 1909. He died on 12 September 1909, at the age of 52.

== Chess books ==
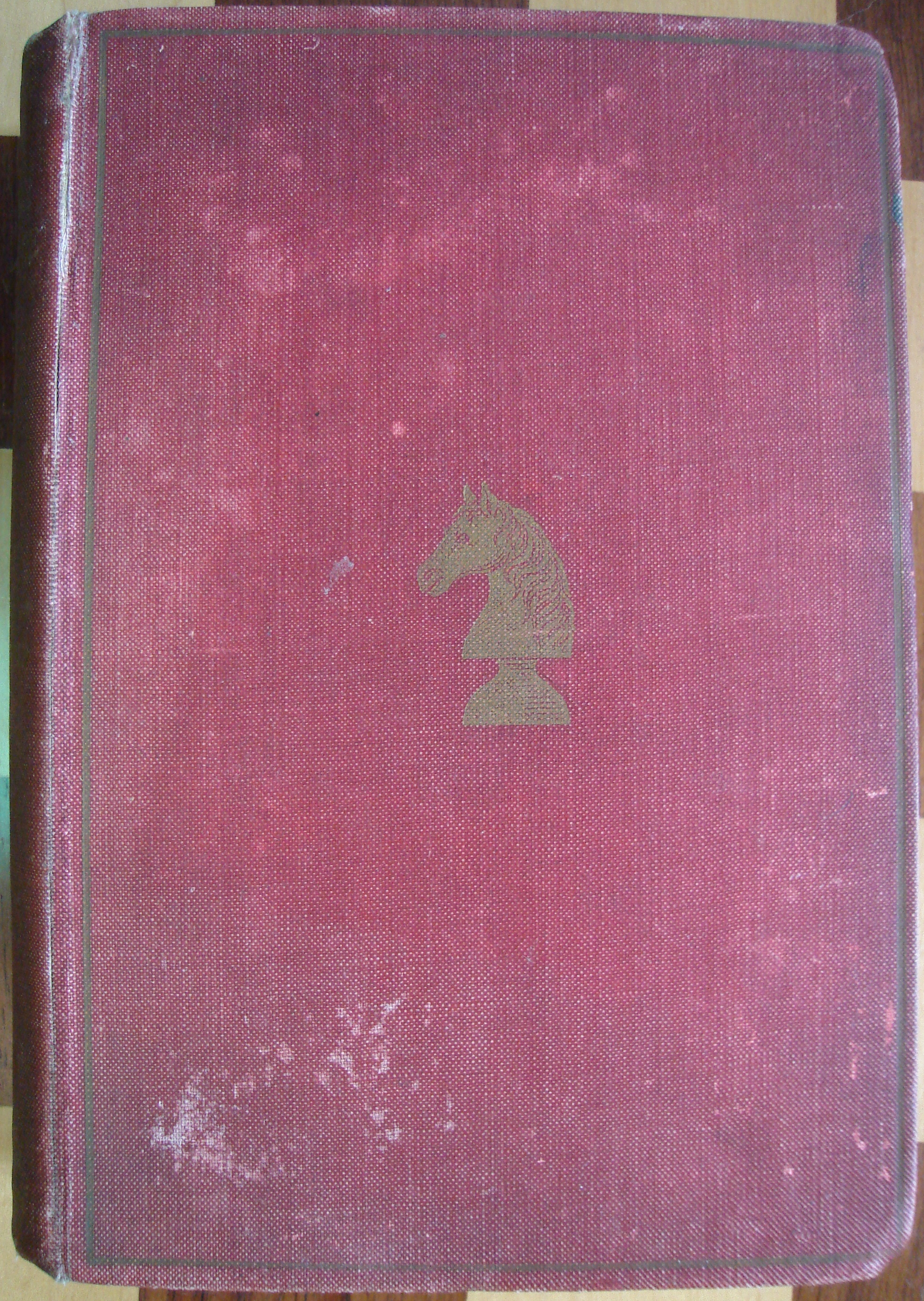
The Complete Chess-Guide by F. J. Lee and George H. D. Gossip (1903)

Lee and George H. D. Gossip co-wrote the books The Chess Player's Mentor (1895) and The Complete Chess-Guide (1903). The latter was in effect a much-expanded version of the former, containing "Chess Player's Mentor" (Part I), "Modern Chess Brilliancies" (Part II), "Guide to the Openings" (Part III), and "Games at Odds" (Part IV).

== Chess strength ==
By Arpad Elo's calculation, Lee's strength during his five-year peak was equivalent to an Elo rating of 2450. Another assessment system, Chessmetrics, calculates that at his peak in February 1898 Lee's play was equivalent to a rating of 2598, and he was the number 25 player in the world. According to Chessmetrics, his highest world rank was number 24 in the world in July 1897.

== Notable games ==
Here, future chess superstar Harry Nelson Pillsbury, not yet 21, blunders a pawn in the opening and is outplayed by Lee. Pillsbury-Lee, New York 1893 1.e4 d5 2.exd5 Qxd5 3.Nc3 Qd8 4.d4 c6 5.Nf3 Bg4 6.Be2 Bxf3 7.Bxf3 e6 8.O-O Nf6 9.Re1 Be7 10.Ne4 Nbd7 11.c3 O-O 12.g3 Nxe4 13.Bxe4 Nf6 14.Bg2 Bd6 15.Bd2 Qa5 16.Qb3 Qc7 17.c4 Rad8 18.c5? Bxc5! 19.Bf4 Bd6 20.Be3 Nd5 21.Rac1 Qb6 22.Qc2 Be7 23.a3 Bf6 24.Rcd1 Rd7 25.Rd3 Qd8 26.Red1 Bg5 27.Qa4 Bxe3 28.fxe3 a6 29.Qb3 Qg5 30.Bf3 Rfd8 31.Kf2 Nf6 32.R1d2 Qf5 33.Kg2 e5 34.Rf2 Qg6 35.Rd1 e4 36.Be2 Nd5 37.Bc4 Qe6 38.Rc1 Qe7 39.Rf5 f6 40.Bxd5+ Rxd5 41.Rc5 Qf7 42.Qb6 R5d6 43.Rf2 Qe7 44.a4 g6 45.h3 Kg7 46.Rfc2 Rd5 47.b4 R8d7 48.b5 axb5 49.axb5 cxb5 50.Rxd5 Rxd5 51.Rc7 Rd7 52.Rc5 b4 53.g4 f5 54.Re5 Qf6 55.Re6 Qg5 56.Qc5 b3 57.Qb5 Rf7 58.Rxe4 Qf6 59.Rf4 Qc6+ 60.Qxc6 bxc6 0-1

Lee defeats another great player, Mikhail Chigorin, who lost two World Championship matches to Wilhelm Steinitz. Chigorin-Lee, London 1899 1.e4 e6 2.Qe2 Nc6 3.Nc3 e5 4.d3 Nd4 5.Qd1 Bb4 6.Bd2 Nf6 7.Nf3 Nc6 8.a3 Bxc3 9.Bxc3 d6 10.Be2 O-O 11.h3 Re8 12.Nd2 d5 13.b3 d4 14.Bb2 Ne7 15.Nf1 Ng6 16.Qd2 c5 17.g3 b5 18.h4 h6 19.f3 Bd7 20.Bc1 a5 21.Bd1 Qc7 22.Qg2 c4 23.Bd2 Ra6 24.Rg1 cxd3 25.cxd3 Rc6 26.Nh2 Rc3 27.Ra2 Rxd3 28.Qe2 Rc3 29.Bxc3 dxc3 30.Nf1 Nf8 31.g4 Ne6 32.g5 Nf4 33.Qe3 hxg5 34.hxg5 N6h5 35.Rh2 b4 36.a4 Qd6 37.Bc2 Qd4 38.Rgh1 g6 39.Kf2 Kf8 40.Kg1 Bc8 41.Kf2 Ba6 42.Rg1 Rd8 43.Rgh1 Bxf1 44.Qxd4 exd4 45.Rxf1 d3 46.Rd1 dxc2 47.Rxd8+ Ke7 48.Rh1 Kxd8 49.Ke3 Ne2 0-1

Lee-Eugene Znosko-Borovsky, Ostend 1907 1.d4 d5 2.Bf4 e6 3.e3 Bd6 4.Bg3 Nf6 5.Nd2 O-O 6.Bd3 Qe7 7.f4 b6 8.Qe2 Bb7 9.Bh4 Nbd7 10.Ngf3 Qe8 11.Ne5 Ne4 12.Nxd7 Qxd7 13.O-O f5 14.Nf3 c5 15.c3 c4 16.Bc2 b5 17.a3 a5 18.Ne5 Qc8 19.g4! Ba6? Correct is 19...b4 with counterplay. 20.gxf5 exf5 21.Kh1 Qe6 22.Rg1 Rac8 23.Rg2 Rc7 24.Rag1 Rb8 25.Qh5 Bf8 26.Bxe4! dxe4 27.d5! Qxd5 28. Ng4! Rb6 29.Nf6+ Rxf6 30.Bxf6 Qf7 31.Rxg7+ Bxg7 32.Rxg7+ Qxg7 33.Bxg7 Kxg7 34.Qxf5 Rf7 35.Qe5+ Kg8 36.Qe6 Bb7 37.Qe8+ Kg7 38.Qxb5 Re7 39.h4 Bc8 40. Qc5 Re8 41.Qxa5 Kf7 42.Qc7+ Kf6 43.Qc6+ Kf7 44.Qxc4+ Kf6 45.Qc6+ Kf7 46. Qd5+ Be6 47.Qh5+ Ke7 48.Qc5+ Kd8 49.f5 Bf7 50.f6 1-0
