= George Alcock MacDonnell =

Irish clergyman (1830–1899)

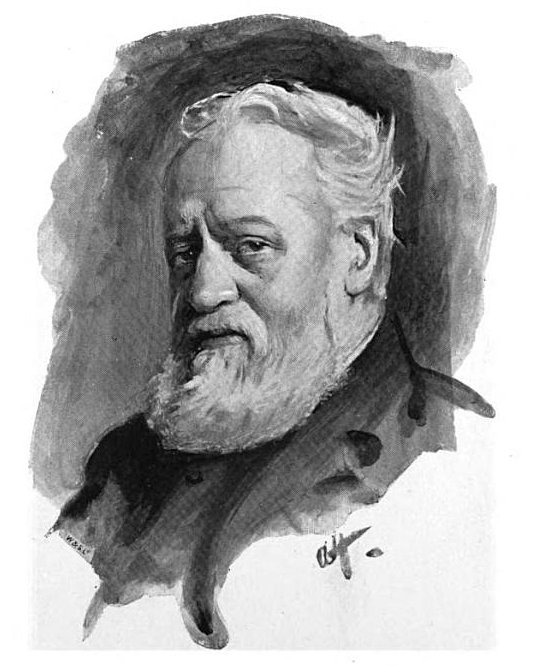
George Alcock MacDonnell

George Alcock MacDonnell (16 August 1830 in Dublin – 3 June 1899 in London) was an Anglican clergyman as well as a chess master and writer.

MacDonnell was a graduate of Trinity College Dublin and was ordained in 1854. After a series of curacies (including St Peter's Church, Walworth and St Pancras Old Church in London), MacDonnell was vicar of Bisbrooke in Rutland from 1887 unitl his death in 1899.

He was one of a group of clergymen who played a prominent role in early Victorian Era English chess; other members of the group included William Wayte, John Owen, Charles Ranken, Edmund Thorold, and Arthur Skipworth. Mike Fox and Richard James remark that, "The English parsons were a talented mob; presumably quiet country parishes in the nineteenth century gave one the leisure needed to become a star. Most of them played under an alias so that their parishioners wouldn't know what they were up to on those long weekends in London."

He tied for 3rd-4th at London 1862 (the 5th British Chess Congress, Adolf Anderssen won), won two matches against George Henry Mackenzie (8 : 5) and (6.5 : 3.5) both at Dublin 1862, shared 1st with Wilhelm Steinitz at Dublin 1865, but lost a play-off game to him there, tied for 2nd-3rd at London 1866 (the 1st British Chess Championship, Cecil De Vere won), tied for 3rd-4th at Dundee (Gustav Neumann won), tied for 3rd-5th at London 1868/69 (the 2nd BCA Challenge Cup, Joseph Henry Blackburne and De Vere won), shared 3rd at London 1872 (Steinitz won), and took 4th at London 1872 (the 4th BCA Challenge Cup, John Wisker and De Vere won).

MacDonnell won a match against Wisker (3.5 : 0.5) at Bristol 1873, and lost a rematch (6 : 9) at London 1874. He took 4th at London 1876 (Blackburne won), took 4th at London 1879 (Quadrangular, Henry Bird won), took 3rd at London 1883 (Vizayanagaram, Curt von Bardeleben won), took 4th at Bath 1884 (Wayte won), tied for 5-6th at London 1885 (Isidor Gunsberg won), shared 1st at London 1866, tied for 7-8th at London 1886 (Blackburne and Amos Burn won), lost a match to Blackburne (1.5 : 2.5) at London 1887, and took 6th at Stamford 1887 (Joseph Henry Blake won).

Under the nom de plume 'Mars', he led a chess column in the Illustrated Sporting and Dramatic News for many years. He wrote two books: Chess Life Pictures (London 1883) and Knights and Kings of Chess (London 1894).
