= James Hanham =

American chess player (1840–1923)

James Moore Hanham
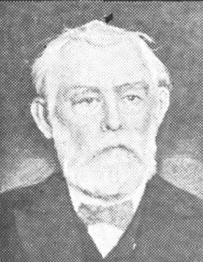

Personal information
- Born: James Moore Hanham; January 4, 1840 Woodville, Mississippi
- Died: December 30, 1923 (aged 83) New York, New York

Chess career
- Country: United States
- Title: Master

Major James Moore Hanham (January 4, 1840 Woodville, Mississippi – December 30, 1923 New York, New York) was an American chess master, who played in many American and international chess tournaments between 1884 and 1889. He fought on the side of the North during the American Civil War, reaching the rank of Major. He is remembered today for several innovations in the opening, particularly the Hanham Variation of Philidor's Defense (1.e4 e5 2.Nf3 d6 3.d4 Nd7).

== Military service, appearance ==
Although a Mississippian, Hanham fought for the Union Army during the Civil War. He saw action at Fort Pickens and Baton Rouge, and was promoted to the rank of Major. After the war, he moved to Manhattan.

A writer in the New York Times, describing the players in the Sixth American Chess Congress (1889), portrayed him as follows:

Major Hanham is a little, nervous man, who hates to sit still. He won his title during the war of the rebellion. He was one of the dudes of the tournament, and was always dressed in the latest style, with a carefully polished silk hat and neatly trimmed beard.

== Chess career ==
Hanham played in many American and international chess tournaments between 1884 and 1899. At American tournaments, he finished second to Eugene Delmar in the 8th and 9th championships of the Manhattan Chess Club, both held in 1885, and at an 1886 New York Chess Club tournament. At Cincinnati 1888, the first United States Chess Association tournament, he tied for 2nd–3rd with 5.5/10, far behind winner Jackson Showalter. He finished 3rd with 3/6 at Lexington 1891, the fourth United States Chess Association tournament, behind Showalter and William Pollock, who tied for first at 5/6. He won two tournaments at Skaneateles, New York in 1891. According to Chessmetrics, Hanham's best-ever performance was at Grove Spring 1898, where he scored 4.5/7 for the New York State team against the Pennsylvania team.

At international tournaments, Hanham performed respectably but not spectacularly, usually finishing in the bottom half. At London and Nottingham, both in 1886, he finished 12th out of 13 with a 3.5/12 score, and 8th out of 10 with a 2/9 score, respectively. At the Sixth American Chess Congress at New York 1889, a double round robin that was one of the longest tournaments in history, Hanham scored 14/38, finishing 16th out of 20 players; Mikhail Chigorin and Max Weiss tied for first with 29 points, edging out Isidor Gunsberg (28.5). At New York 1894, Hanham tied for 7th–9th with a 4/10 score; recently dethroned World Champion Wilhelm Steinitz won with 8.5/10.

One of Hanham's best results was at New York 1893, where he scored 7.5/13 (finishing 6th of 14 players), beat the young Harry Nelson Pillsbury, and finished half a point ahead of him. Emanuel Lasker, who would become World Champion the following year, won with a perfect score.

By Arpad Elo's calculation, Hanham's strength during his five-year peak was equivalent to an Elo rating of 2360.

At the time of his death in 1923, Hanham was the oldest player of master rank in the United States.

== Opening innovations ==
Hanham's name is best remembered today for the Hanham Variation of Philidor's Defense (1.e4 e5 2.Nf3 d6 3.d4 Nd7). David Hooper and Kenneth Whyld note in The Oxford Companion to Chess that this line, which became a favorite of the great player and theoretician Aron Nimzowitsch, allows Black to maintain a defensive center and has become one of the main lines of Philidor's Defense. Larry Kaufman writes that it is a "strategically rich variation" but is out of favor today because 4.Bc4! is awkward for Black, when 4...Ngf6? loses to 5.Ng5, 4...Be7? loses a pawn to 5.dxe5 Nxe5 (5...dxe5? 6.Qd5! wins) 6.Nxe5 dxe5 7.Qh5!, and 4...c6 (best) allows 5.0-0 Be7 6.dxe5 dxe5 (6...Nxe5? 7.Nxe5 dxe5 8.Qh5 wins a pawn) 6.Ng5! Bxg5 7.Qh5 Qe7 8.Qxg5, when White's bishop pair gives him a substantial advantage. To avoid this line, today Black often tries to reach the Hanham by different move orders, such as 1.e4 e5 2.Nf3 d6 3.d4 Nf6 4.Nc3 Nbd7, 1.e4 d6 2.d4 Nf6 3.Nc3 e5 4.Nf3 Nbd7, or 1.e4 d6 2.d4 Nf6 3.Nc3 Nbd7 4.Nf3 e5.

Hooper and Whyld also credit Hanham with introducing a number of other opening lines, including the Grand Prix Attack against the Sicilian Defense (1.e4 c5 2.Nc3 Nc6 3.f4), the Indian Opening (1.e4 e5 2.d3), and the Hanham Variation of the French Defense (1.e4 e6 2.d3), often referred to today as the King's Indian Attack.

== Notable game ==
Position: g1 white king, f1 white rook, a1 white rook, h2 white pawn, g2 white pawn, f2 white pawn, e2 white queen, c2 white pawn, b2 white pawn, a2 white pawn, f3 white knight, e3 white bishop, c3 white knight, e4 white pawn, d4 white pawn, c4 white bishop, e5 black pawn, f6 black knight, d6 black pawn, c6 black pawn, h7 black pawn, g7 black pawn, f7 black pawn, e7 black bishop, d7 black knight, c7 black queen, b7 black pawn, a7 black pawn, g8 black king, f8 black rook, c8 black bishop, a8 black rook

Blackburne – Hanham, position after 8...Qc7: Black has reached a classic Hanham setup

In this game from the Sixth American Chess Congress (at New York in 1889), Hanham (playing Black) uses his eponymous variation to defeat Joseph Henry Blackburne, one of the world's leading players:

1.e4 e5 2.Nf3 d6 3.Bc4 Be7 4.Nc3 c6 5.d4 Nd7 6.O-O Ngf6 7.Qe2 O-O 8.Be3 Qc7 reaching the typical setup of the Hanham Variation of Philidor's Defense. 9.Bb3 h6 10.Nh4 Nb6 11.Ng6 Re8 12.dxe5 dxe5 13.h3 Bd6 14.Rad1 Be6 15.Bxe6 Rxe6 16.Nh4 Nbd7 17.Nf5 Bf8 18.g4 Nh7 19.h4 Rg6 20.Kh1 Nc5 21.Rg1 Ne6 22.Rg3 Rd8 23.Rdg1 Nd4 24.Qf1 Nxc2 25.Bc1 Nd4 26.h5 Rf6 27.f4 exf4 28.Bxf4 Qa5 29.Qc1 Re6 30.Bd2 Qe5 31.Bf4 Qa5 32.Be3 Nb5 33.Bd2 Nxc3 34.Bxc3 Qa4 35.Re1 Rxe4 36.b3 Rxe1+ 37.Qxe1 Qxa2 38.g5 hxg5 39.h6 Qc2 40.Nd4 Qg6 41.Qe5 Qxh6+ 42.Kg2 Qd6 43.Qe2 Qd5+ 44.Kh3 Qh1+ 45.Kg4 Nf6+ 46.Kxg5 Rd5+ 47.Kf4 Bd6+ 0-1
