= William Wayte =

British chess master and cleric

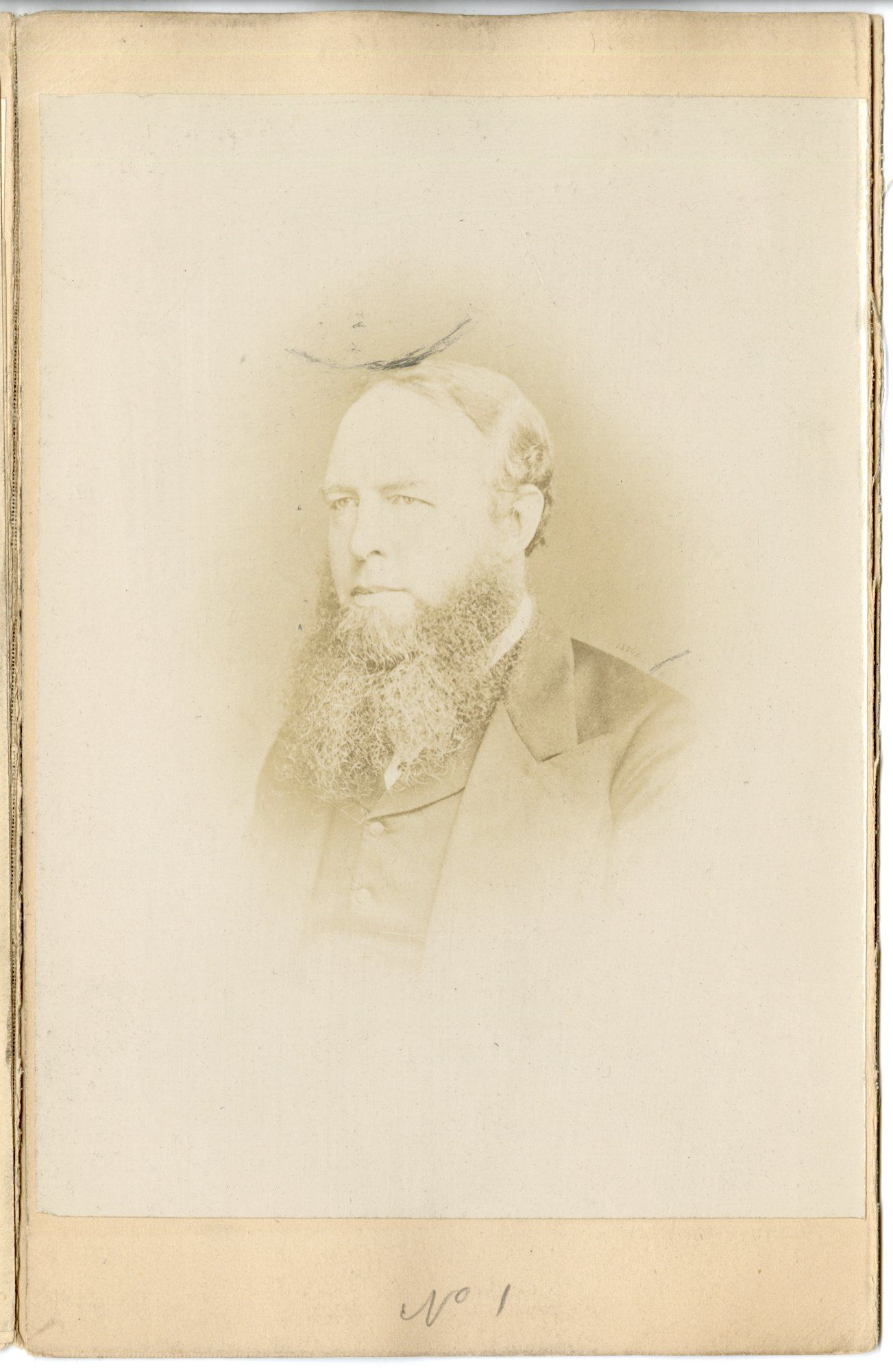

Personal information
- Born: William Wayte; 4 September 1829 Calne, England
- Died: 3 May 1898 (aged 68) London, England

Chess career
- Country: England
- Title: Master

William Wayte (4 September 1829 – 3 May 1898) was a Church of England cleric and a British chess master. He was one of a group of ministers who played a prominent role in English chess in the late nineteenth century. Although little remembered today, according to Chessmetrics he was the number 9 player in the world at his peak in 1878.

== Education, religious and academic career ==
Wayte was born in Calne, England on 4 September 1829. In 1850, he became a Craven Scholar and Brown's Medallist. In 1853, Wayte received his B.A. and became a deacon. He also became an assistant master at Eton College, a position he held until 1875. After becoming a priest in 1854 (Oxford), Wayte went on to receive his MA degree in 1856. In 1862, he took on the position of Select Preacher at the University of Cambridge.

In 1876, Wayte became a professor of Greek at University College London. He continued with his interest in Greek, editing the 5th edition of Plato's Protagoras (1888), the 2nd edition of Demosthenes' Androtion and Timocrates (1893), and the Dictionary of Greek and Roman Antiquities.

== Chess career ==
Wayte was one of a group of ministers who played a prominent role in early Victorian Era English chess. Other members of the group included George Alcock MacDonnell, John Owen, Charles Ranken, Edmund Thorold, and Arthur Skipworth. Mike Fox and Richard James remark that, "The English parsons were a talented mob; presumably quiet country parishes in the nineteenth century gave one the leisure needed to become a star. Most of them played under an alias so that their parishioners wouldn't know what they were up to on those long weekends in London." Wayte's alias was "W.H.C."

Wayte played in a number of tournaments in Britain between 1861 and 1893. In 1868, he finished second with 6.5 of 9 possible points, behind Rev. Thorold (8.5 points) at the 4th Counties Chess Association Congress in York. In 1871, he again finished second with 6.5 of 9 possible points, behind Arthur Skipworth (7 points), at the 3rd British Chess Association Challenge Cup in Malvern. In 1872, he finished third in the first-class section at the 8th Counties Chess Association Congress in Malvern with 10.5 of 14 possible points, behind Revs. Ranken (12 points) and Thorold (11.5 points). In 1873, he finished second with 7 of 9 possible points, behind Skipworth (8 points) at the 9th Counties Chess Association Congress in Bristol.

In 1876, Wayte scored 9 of 12 possible points, tying for 2nd–4th, with James Minchin and Rev. Owen, behind Amos Burn (11 points). In 1877, he defeated Minchin in a match held in London (11 wins, 1 draw, 7 losses). At London 1878, he won the Loewenthal Cup, scoring an undefeated 13 of 14 possible points in the double round robin event. At London 1879, he again won the Loewenthal Cup, scoring 9 of 12 possible points in a triple round robin format. With his chess career advancing, Wayte left his professor position at the University College London in 1879.

In 1881, he finished third in the 16th British Counties Chess Association Congress in Leamington with 7 of 9 possible points, behind Revs. Ranken (8 points) and Owen (7.5 points). In 1884, he won the 19th Counties Chess Association tournament in Bath with 5 of 6 possible points, ahead of such strong players as Henry Bird and Rev. MacDonnell. In 1884, he defeated Rev. Thorold in a match held in London (7 wins, 4 draws, 5 losses).

On 4 April 1885, Wayte was featured in a cartoon by noted artist and illustrator Harry Furniss in the magazine Punch, a British weekly magazine of humour and satire. The cartoon featured a room with Wayte and other leading chess players. In the cartoon, Wayte was drawn with a massive head and beetling brow seated at a chess table facing leading chess player Johannes Zukertort. By 1894, Wayte was considered a famous member of the Counties' Association. He wrote for the British Chess Magazine, which as of 2009 is the world's oldest chess magazine in continuous publication.

Wayte died on 3 May 1898 in London, England.

== Notable games ==
Position: g1 white king, f1 white rook, h2 white pawn, g2 white pawn, e2 white queen, b2 white pawn, a2 white pawn, e3 white bishop, c3 white pawn, e4 black knight, d4 black pawn, e5 white knight, d5 black pawn, b6 black bishop, h7 black pawn, g7 black pawn, c7 black pawn, a7 black pawn, g8 black king, f8 black queen, a8 black rook

Schmid-Wayte, position after 19.Rf1?

Shortly before the following game, Steinitz had written that a rook, bishop, and well-supported passed pawn were often more than a match for a queen. Fred Reinfeld writes, "One can therefore imagine how delighted he was to pounce on this game as proof of his theory." Dr. Schmid-Wayte, Dresden 1880 1.e4 e5 2.f4 exf4 3.Bc4 Nf6 4.Nc3 Nc6 5.Nf3 Bb4 6.e5? d5! 7.Bb5 Ne4 8.0-0 0-0 Here and on the next move, Reinfeld recommends that Black play ...g5!, keeping the gambit pawn and making it difficult for White to develop properly. 9.Ne2 Bg4 10.d3 Bc5+ 11.d4 Bb6 12.Bxf4 f6 13.c3 fxe5 14.Bxc6 bxc6 15.Nxe5 Bxe2 16.Qxe2 c5 17.Be3 cxd4 18.Rxf8+ Rxf8 19.Rf1? 19.cxd4 was correct, with a slight advantage to White according to Reinfeld. 19...dxe3! A strong queen sacrifice. 20.Rxf8+ Rxf8 21.Nf3 g5! Threatening to dislodge the knight with ...g4. Here, Steinitz analysed 22.Nd4 c5! 23.Nb3 d4! 24.cxd4 cxd4 25.Nxd4 (or 25.Nc1 Rf2 26.Qc4+ Kg7 27.Nd3 Rf1+! 28.Kxf1 Nd2+ and wins) Bxd4 26.Qc4+ Rf7 27.Qxd4 e2 28.Qd8+ Kg7 29.Qd4+ Kh6 30.Qxe4 Rf1#. 22.h3 Ng3 23.Qe1 e2+ 24.Kh2 Nf1+ 25.Kh1 Be3! Threatening 26...Rxf3! 27.gxf3 Bd2! followed by queening the pawn. The pawn is immune from capture, since Qxe2 is met by Ng3+, forking White's king and queen. 26.Qb1 Rxf3! 27.gxf3 Bf2 28.Qd3 Ng3+ 29.Kg2 e1(N)+! 30.Kxf2 Nxd3+ 31.Kxg3 Nxb2 0-1

Position: a8 black rook, c8 black bishop, d8 black queen, e8 black rook, g8 black king, a7 black pawn, b7 black pawn, c7 black pawn, e7 black knight, f7 black pawn, g7 black bishop, h7 black pawn, d6 black pawn, g6 black pawn, d5 white knight, e4 white pawn, f4 white pawn, c3 white pawn, d3 white bishop, a2 white pawn, b2 white pawn, g2 white pawn, h2 white pawn, a1 white rook, c1 white bishop, d1 white queen, f1 white rook, g1 white king

Wayte-Ranken, position after 13...Ne7

Francis Wellmuth writes of the following game between two clergymen, "A surprise attack bowls Black over". Wayte-Ranken, Edinburgh 1877 1.e4 e5 2.Nf3 Nc6 3.d4 exd4 4.Nxd4 Bc5 5.Nf5!? g6 World Champion Wilhelm Steinitz later recommended 5...d5 6.Nxg7+ Kf8 7.Nh5 Qh4 8.Ng3 Nf6. Over a century after this game, World Champion Anatoly Karpov played 5...d6 against Jan Timman, with a similar idea. 6.Ne3 Nf6 7.Bd3 0-0 8.0-0 Re8 9.Nc3 Bd4 10.Ned5 Nxd5 11.Nxd5 d6 12.c3 Bg7 13.f4 Ne7 14.f5! gxf5 15.Bg5 fxe4 16.Bxe4 Qd7 17.Bxh7+ Kxh7 18.Qh5+ Kg8 19.Qxf7+ Kh8 20.Nf6! 1-0 For another game between these players, see Charles Ranken.
