= London 1862 chess tournament =

An international chess tournament was held in London, during the second British world exhibition, in 1862.

The prizes were won by Adolf Anderssen (£100), Louis Paulsen (£50), John Owen (£30), George Alcock MacDonnell (£15), Serafino Dubois (£10) and Wilhelm Steinitz (£5) who was awarded the brilliancy prize for his win over Augustus Mongredien.

The final results and standings:

#	Player	1	2	3	4	5	6	7	8	9	10	11	12	13	14	Total
1	Adolf Anderssen (Prussia)	x	1	0	1	1	1	1	1	1	-	1	1	r1	1	11
2	Louis Paulsen (German Confederation)	0	x	1	1	0	1	r1	1	r1	-	1	-	1	1	9
3	John Owen (United Kingdom)	1	0	x	0	r	r1	1	1	0	-	1	-	rr1	rr1	7
4	George Alcock MacDonnell (United Kingdom)	0	0	1	x	0	1	-	0	1	-	1	1	1	1	7
5	Serafino Dubois (Kingdom of Italy)	0	1	r	1	x	0	1	1	r	-	-	-	r1	1	6
6	Wilhelm Steinitz (Austrian Empire)	0	0	r0	0	1	x	1	1	0	-	1	-	1	rr1	6
7	Thomas Wilson Barnes (United Kingdom)	0	r0	0	-	0	0	x	r1	1	0	1	r1	1	1	6
8	James Hannah (United Kingdom)	0	0	0	1	0	0	r0	x	1	-	-	-	1	1	4
9	Joseph Henry Blackburne (United Kingdom)	0	r0	1	0	r	1	0	0	x	-	0	0	rr	1	3
10	Johann Jacob Löwenthal (Austrian Empire)	-	-	-	-	-	-	1	-	-	x	-	-	1	1	3
11	James Robey (United Kingdom)	0	0	0	0	-	0	0	-	1	-	x	1	0	0	2
12	Frederick Deacon (Belgium)	0	-	-	0	-	-	r0	-	1	-	0	x	0	1	2
13	Augustus Mongredien (United Kingdom)	r0	0	rr0	0	r0	0	0	0	rr	0	1	1	x	0	2
14	Valentine Green (United Kingdom)	0	0	rr0	0	0	rr0	0	0	0	0	1	0	1	x	2

== Literature ==
- Löwenthal, Johann Jacob "The Chess Congress of 1862", Henry G. Bohn, York Street, Covent Garden, London, 1864
