= Wilhelm Steinitz =

Austrian-American chess player (1836–1900)

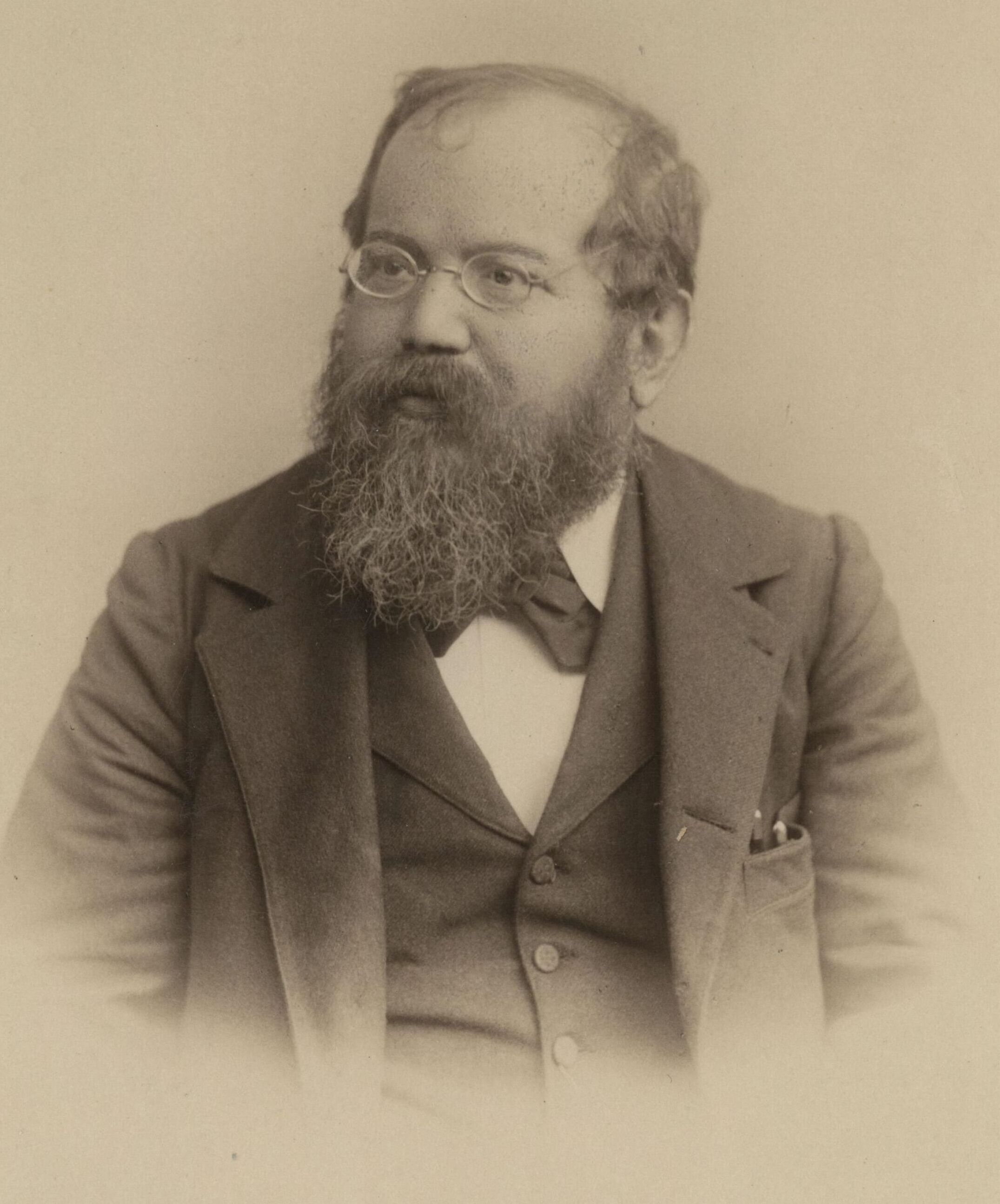

Personal information
- Born: May 14, 1836 Prague, Kingdom of Bohemia, Austrian Empire
- Died: August 12, 1900 (aged 64) New York City, United States

Chess career
- Country: Austrian Empire → Austria-Hungary; United States
- World Champion: 1886–1894

William Steinitz (born Wilhelm Steinitz; May 14, 1836 – August 12, 1900) was a Bohemian-Austrian, and later American, chess player. From 1886 to 1894, he was the first World Chess Champion. He was also a highly influential writer and chess theoretician.

When discussing chess history from the 1850s onwards, commentators have debated whether Steinitz could be effectively considered the champion from an earlier time, perhaps as early as 1866. Steinitz lost his title to Emanuel Lasker in 1894, and lost a rematch in 1896–97.

Statistical rating systems give Steinitz a rather low ranking among world champions, mainly because he took several long breaks from competitive play. However, an analysis based on one of these rating systems shows that he was one of the most dominant players in the history of the game. Steinitz was unbeaten in match play for 32 years, from 1862 to 1894.

Although Steinitz became "world number one" by winning in the all-out attacking style that was common in the 1860s, he unveiled in 1873 a new positional style of play, and demonstrated that it was superior to the previous style. His new style was controversial and some even branded it as "cowardly", but many of Steinitz's games showed that it could also set up attacks as ferocious as those of the old school.

Steinitz was also a prolific writer on chess, and defended his new ideas vigorously. The debate was so bitter and sometimes abusive that it became known as the "Ink War". By the early 1890s, Steinitz's approach was widely accepted, and the next generation of top players acknowledged their debt to him, most notably his successor as world champion, Emanuel Lasker.

Traditional accounts of Steinitz's character depict him as ill-tempered and aggressive, but more recent research shows that he had long and friendly relationships with some players and chess organizations. Most notably from 1888 to 1889 he co-operated with the American Chess Congress in a project to define rules governing the conduct of future world championships. Steinitz was unskilled at managing money and lived in poverty all his life.

== Early life ==
Steinitz was born on May 14, 1836, in the Jewish ghetto of Prague (now capital of the Czech Republic; then in Bohemia, a part of the Austrian Empire). The youngest of tailor Josef-Salomon Steinitz's thirteen sons by his first wife, he learned to play chess at age 12. After studying Talmud in his youth, he began playing serious chess in his twenties, after leaving Prague in 1857 to study mathematics at the Vienna Polytechnic. Steinitz spent two years at the university.

== Chess career (through 1881) ==
Steinitz improved rapidly in chess during the late 1850s, progressing from third place in the 1859 Vienna City championship to first in 1861, with a score of 30/31. During this period he was nicknamed "the Austrian Morphy". This achievement meant that he had become the strongest player in Austria.

=== International debut ===
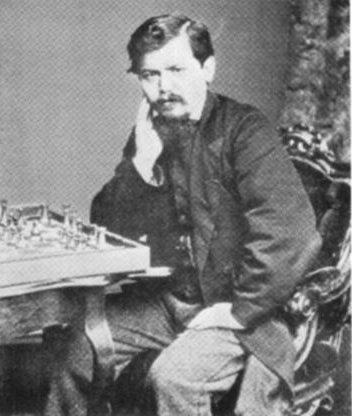
Steinitz in 1866

Steinitz was then sent to represent Austria in the London 1862 chess tournament. He placed sixth, but his win over Augustus Mongredien was awarded the tournament's brilliancy prize. He immediately challenged the fifth-placed contestant, the strong veteran Italian Master Serafino Dubois, to a match, which Steinitz won (five wins, one draw, three losses). This encouraged him to turn professional, and he took up residence in London. In 1862–63 Steinitz scored a crushing win in a match with Joseph Henry Blackburne, who went on to be one of the world's top ten for 20 years, but who had only started playing chess two years earlier. Steinitz then beat some leading UK players in matches: Frederick Deacon and the aforementioned Mongredien in 1863 followed by Valentine Green in 1864. This charge up the rankings had a price: in March 1863 Steinitz apologized in a letter to Ignác Kolisch for not repaying a loan, because while Steinitz had been beating Blackburne, Daniel Harrwitz had "taken over" all of Steinitz's clients at the London Chess Club, who had provided Steinitz's main source of income.

=== Match against Anderssen ===
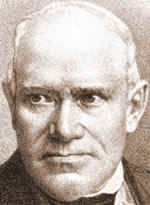
Adolf Anderssen was recognized as the world's top player until 1866, when Steinitz won a match against him.

These successes established Steinitz as one of the world's top players, and he was able to arrange a match in 1866 in London against Adolf Anderssen, who was regarded as the world's strongest active player because he had won the 1851 and 1862 London International Tournaments and his one superior, Paul Morphy, had retired from competitive chess. Steinitz won with eight wins and six losses (there were no draws), but it was a hard fight; after 12 games the scores were level at 6–6, then Steinitz won the last two games.

As a result of this match victory, Steinitz was generally regarded as the world's best player. The prize money for this match was £100 to the winner (Steinitz) and £20 for the loser (Anderssen). The winner's prize was a large sum by the standards of the times, equivalent to about £57,500 in 2007's money.

=== Continued match play success ===
In the years following his victory over Anderssen, Steinitz beat Henry Bird in 1866 (seven wins, five losses, five draws). He also comfortably beat Johannes Zukertort in 1872 (seven wins, four draws, one loss; Zukertort had proved himself one of the elite by beating Anderssen by a large margin in 1871).

=== Gradually improves tournament results ===
It took longer for Steinitz to reach the top in tournament play. In the next few years he took: third place at Paris 1867 behind Ignatz Kolisch and Simon Winawer; and second place at Dundee (1867; Gustav Neumann won), and Baden-Baden 1870 chess tournament; behind Anderssen but ahead of Blackburne, Louis Paulsen and other strong players. His first victory in a strong tournament was London 1872, ahead of Blackburne and Zukertort; and the first tournament in which Steinitz finished ahead of Anderssen was the Vienna 1873 chess tournament, when Anderssen was 55 years old.

=== Changes style, introduces positional school ===
All of Steinitz's successes up to 1872 were achieved in the attack-at-all-costs "Romantic" style exemplified by Anderssen. But in the Vienna 1873 chess tournament, Steinitz unveiled a new "positional" style of play which was to become the basis of modern chess. He tied for first place with Blackburne, ahead of Anderssen, Samuel Rosenthal, Paulsen and Henry Bird, and won the play-off against Blackburne. Steinitz made a shaky start, but won his last 14 games in the main tournament (including 2–0 results over Paulsen, Anderssen, and Blackburne) plus the two play-off games – this was the start of a 25-game winning streak in serious competition.

=== Hiatus from competitive chess ===
Between 1873 and 1882 Steinitz played no tournaments and only one match (a 7–0 win against Blackburne in 1876). His other games during this period were in simultaneous and blindfold exhibitions, which contributed an important part of a professional chess-player's income in those days (for example in 1887 Blackburne was paid 9 guineas for two simultaneous exhibitions and a blindfold exhibition hosted by the Teesside Chess Association; this was equivalent to about £4,800 at 2007 values).

==== Chess journalist ====
Instead, Steinitz concentrated on his work as a chess journalist, notably for The Field, which was Britain's leading sports magazine. Some of Steinitz's commentaries aroused heated debates, notably from Zukertort and Leopold Hoffer in The Chess Monthly (which they founded in 1879). This "Ink War" escalated sharply in 1881, when Steinitz mercilessly criticized Hoffer's annotations of games in the 1881 Berlin Congress (won by Blackburne ahead of Zukertort). Steinitz was eager to settle the analytical debates by a second match against Zukertort, whose unwillingness to play provoked scornful comments from Steinitz. In mid-1882 James Mason, a consistently strong player, challenged Steinitz to a match, and accused Steinitz of cowardice when Steinitz insisted the issue with Zukertort should be settled first. Steinitz responded by inviting Mason to name a sufficiently high stake for a match, at least £150 per player (equivalent to £15,601 in 2025), but Mason was unwilling to stake more than £100. Mason later agreed to play a match with Zukertort for a stake of £100 per player, but soon "postponed" that match, writing that "circumstances having arisen that make it highly inconvenient for me to proceed ..."

==== Rivalry with Zukertort ====
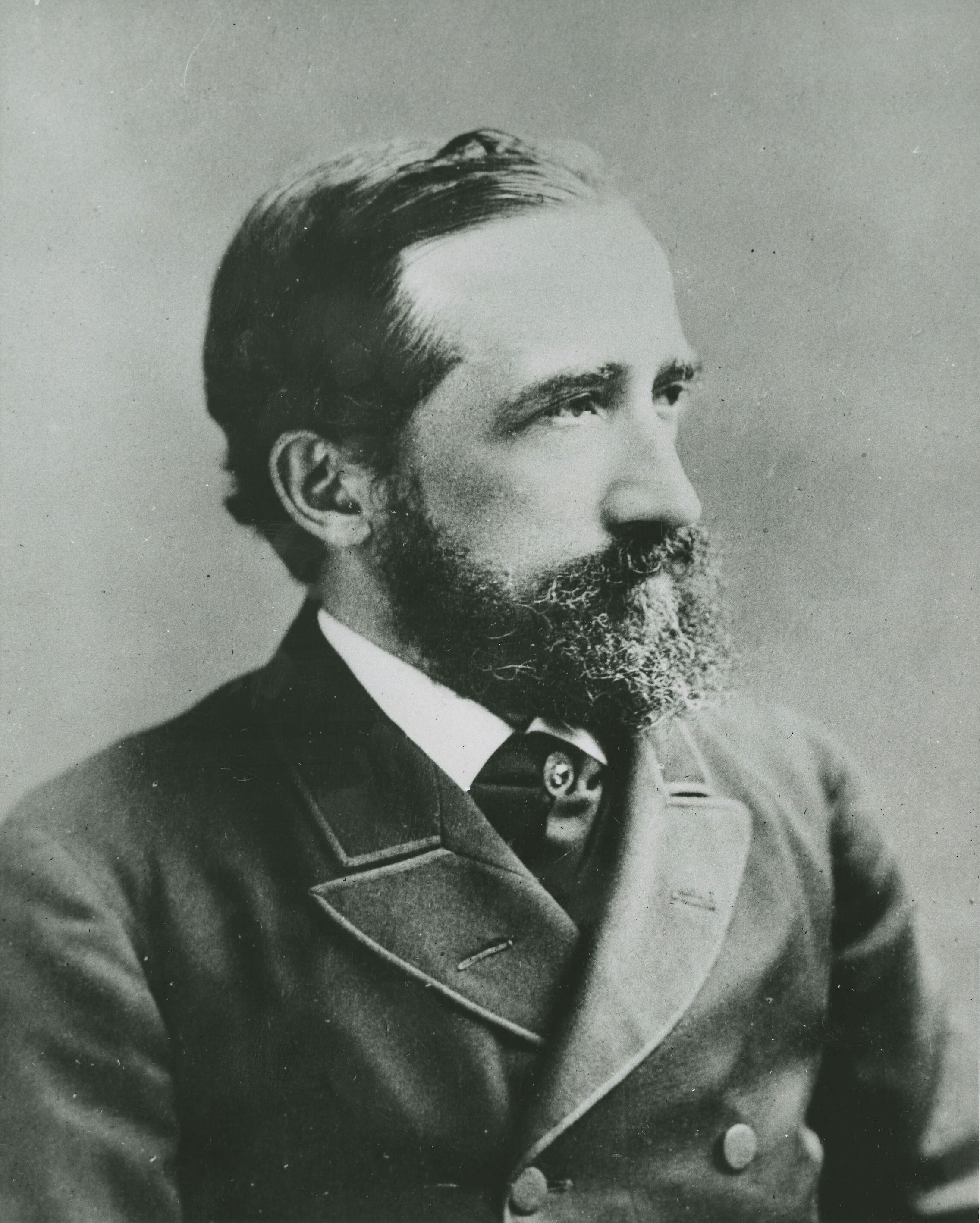
Steinitz's rival and bitter enemy Johannes Zukertort lost matches to him in 1872 and 1886. The second match made Steinitz the undisputed world champion.

Steinitz's long lay-off caused some commentators to suggest that Zukertort, who had scored some notable tournament victories, should be regarded as the world chess champion. As an example, The Chess Player's Chronicle in July 1883 opined that 'Steinitz was, at one time, fairly entitled to the position of champion...He has just taken an inferior place to Zukertort, in a tournament, and for the time being Zukertort, in the opinion of some, becomes champion'. Zukertort, the son of Jewish converts to Protestantism who missionized among Polish Jews, told Steinitz: "You are not a chessplayer, but a Jew".

== Comeback success ==
Steinitz returned to serious competitive chess in the Vienna 1882 chess tournament, which has been described as the strongest chess tournament of all time at that point. Despite a shaky start he took equal first place with Szymon Winawer, ahead of James Mason, Zukertort, George Henry Mackenzie, Blackburne, Berthold Englisch, Paulsen and Mikhail Chigorin, and drew the play-off match.

=== Visits the United States ===
Steinitz visited the United States, mainly the Philadelphia area, from December 1882 to May 1883. He was given an enthusiastic reception. Steinitz played several exhibitions, many casual games, and a match for stakes of £50 with a wealthy amateur. He also won three more serious matches with two New World professionals, Alexander Sellman (Steinitz won both) and the Cuban champion Celso Golmayo Zúpide. The match with Golmayo was abandoned when Steinitz was leading (eight wins, one draw, one loss). His hosts even arranged a visit to New Orleans, where Paul Morphy lived.

=== Return to London ===
Later in 1883, Steinitz took second place in the extremely strong London 1883 chess tournament behind Zukertort, who made a brilliant start, faded at the end but finished three points ahead. Steinitz finished 2½ points ahead of the third-placed competitor, Blackburne. Zukertort's victory again led some commentators to suggest that Zukertort should be regarded as the world chess champion, while others said the issue could only be resolved by a match between Steinitz and Zukertort.

=== Settles in United States ===
In 1883, shortly after the London tournament, Steinitz decided to leave England and moved to New York City, where he lived for the rest of his life. This did not end the "Ink War": his enemies persuaded some of the American press to publish anti-Steinitz articles, and in 1885 Steinitz founded the International Chess Magazine, which he edited until 1895. In his magazine he chronicled the lengthy negotiations for a match with Zukertort. He also managed to find supporters in other sections of the American press including Turf, Field and Farm and the St. Louis Globe-Democrat, both of which reported Steinitz's offer to forgo all fees, expenses or share in the stake and make the match "a benefit performance, solely for Mr Zukertort's pecuniary profit".

=== World Championship match ===
Eventually it was agreed that in 1886 Steinitz and Zukertort would play a match in New York, St. Louis and New Orleans, and that the victor would be the player who first won 10 games. At Steinitz's insistence the contract said it would be "for the Championship of the World". After the five games played in New York, Zukertort led by 4–1, but in the end Steinitz won decisively by 12½–7½ (ten wins, five draws, five losses), becoming the first official world champion on March 29. The collapse by Zukertort, who won only one of the last 15 games, has been described as "perhaps the most thoroughgoing reversal of fortune in the history of world championship play."

Though not yet officially an American citizen, Steinitz wanted the United States flag to be placed next to him during the match. He became a US citizen on November 23, 1888, having resided for five years in New York, and changed his first name from Wilhelm to William.

In 1887 the American Chess Congress started work on drawing up regulations for the future conduct of world championship contests. Steinitz actively supported this endeavor, as he thought he was becoming too old to remain world champion – he wrote in his own magazine "I know I am not fit to be the champion, and I am not likely to bear that title for ever".

=== Defeats Chigorin ===
In 1888 the Havana Chess Club offered to sponsor a match between Steinitz and whomever he would select as a worthy opponent. Steinitz nominated the Russian Mikhail Chigorin, on the condition that the invitation should not be presented as a challenge from him. There is some doubt about whether this was intended to be a match for the world championship: both Steinitz's letters and the publicity material just before the match conspicuously avoided the phrase. The proposed match was to have a maximum of 20 games, and Steinitz had said that fixed-length matches were unsuitable for world championship contests because the first player to take the lead could then play for draws; and Steinitz was at the same time supporting the American Chess Congress's world championship project. Whatever the status of the match, it was played in Havana in January to February 1889, and won by Steinitz (ten wins, one draw, six losses).

==== New York 1889 tournament ====
The American Chess Congress's final proposal was that the winner of a tournament to be held in New York in 1889 should be regarded as world champion for the time being, but must be prepared to face a challenge from the second or third placed competitor within a month. Steinitz wrote that he would not play in the tournament and would not challenge the winner unless the second and third placed competitors failed to do so. The tournament was duly played, but the outcome was not quite as planned: Mikhail Chigorin and Max Weiss tied for first place; their play-off resulted in four draws, and Weiss then wanted to get back to his work for the Rothschild Bank, conceding the title to Chigorin. However, the third prize-winner Isidor Gunsberg was prepared to play for the title.

A Steinitz–Gunsberg match was played in New York in 1890 and ended in a 10½–8½ victory for Steinitz. The American Chess Congress's experiment was not repeated, and Steinitz's last three matches were private arrangements between the players.

=== Wins rematch against Chigorin ===
In 1891 the Saint Petersburg Chess Society and the Havana Chess Club offered to organize another Steinitz–Chigorin match for the world championship. Steinitz played against Chigorin in Havana in 1892, and won narrowly (ten wins, five draws, eight losses).

German Dr. Siegbert Tarrasch turned down an opportunity in 1892 to challenge Steinitz in a world championship match, because of the demands of his medical practice.

=== Loses title to Lasker ===
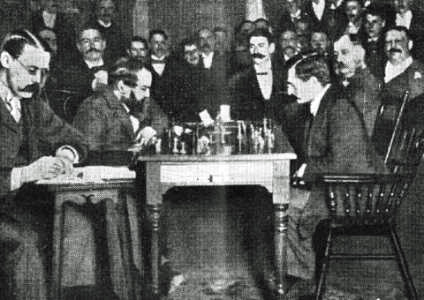
Emanuel Lasker (right) playing Steinitz for the World Chess Championship, New York 1894

Around this time Steinitz publicly spoke of retiring, but changed his mind when Emanuel Lasker, 32 years younger and comparatively untested at the top level, challenged him. Lasker had been earlier that year refused a non-title challenge by fellow German, Dr. Siegbert Tarrasch, who was at the time the world's most dominant tournament player.

Initially, Lasker wanted to play for $5,000 a side, and a match was agreed at stakes of $3,000 a side, but Steinitz agreed to a series of reductions when Lasker found it difficult to raise the money, and the final figure was $2,000 each, which was less than for some of Steinitz's earlier matches (the final combined stake of $4,000 would be worth about $114,000 at 2016 values). Although this was publicly praised as an act of sportsmanship on Steinitz's part, Steinitz may have desperately needed the money.

The match was played in 1894, at venues in New York, Philadelphia and Montreal, Canada. The 32-year age difference between the combatants was the largest in the history of world championship play, and remains so today. Steinitz had previously declared he would win without doubt, so it came as a shock when Lasker won the first game. Steinitz responded by winning the second, and was able to maintain the balance until the sixth. However, Lasker won all the games from the seventh to the 11th, and Steinitz asked for a one-week rest. When the match resumed, Steinitz looked in better shape and won the 13th and 14th games. Lasker struck back in the 15th and 16th, and Steinitz was unable to compensate for his losses in the middle of the match. Hence Lasker won with ten wins, five losses and four draws. Some commentators thought Steinitz's habit of playing "experimental" moves in serious competition was a major factor in his downfall.

==== Increased tournament activity ====
After losing the title, Steinitz played in tournaments more frequently than he had previously. He won at New York City 1894, and was fifth at Hastings 1895 (winning the first brilliancy prize for his game with Curt von Bardeleben). At Saint Petersburg 1895, a super-strong four player, multi-round-robin event, with Lasker, Chigorin and Pillsbury, he took second place behind Lasker. Later his results began to decline: 6th in Nuremberg 1896, 5th in Cologne 1898, 10th in London 1899.

In early 1896, Steinitz defeated the Russian Emanuel Schiffers in a match (winning 6 games, drawing 1, losing 4).

==== Rematch with Lasker ====
In November 1896 to January 1897 Steinitz played a return match with Lasker in Moscow, but won only 2 games, drawing 5, and losing 10. This was the last world chess championship match for eleven years. Shortly after the match, Steinitz had a mental breakdown and was confined for 40 days in a Moscow sanatorium, where he played chess with the inmates.

== Controversy on the beginning of Steinitz's success ==
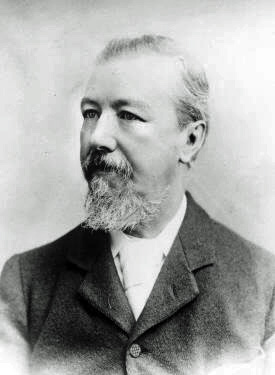
Joseph Blackburne. Steinitz beat him 7–0 in 1876, but George Alcock MacDonnell hailed Blackburne as "World Champion" for his win in the 1881 Berlin Tournament.

There is a long-running debate among chess writers about whether Steinitz's reign as World Chess Champion began in 1866, when he beat Anderssen, or in 1886, when he beat Zukertort. In April 1894 the British Chess Magazine described Steinitz as holding "the chess championship of the world for 28 years". However, there is no evidence that he claimed the title for himself in 1866, although in the 1880s he claimed to have been the champion since his win over Anderssen. It has been suggested that Steinitz could not make such a claim while Paul Morphy was alive. Morphy had defeated Anderssen by a far wider margin, 8–3, in 1858, but retired from chess competition soon after he returned to the US in 1859, and died in 1884. The 1886 Steinitz vs. Zukertort match was the first that was explicitly described as being for the World Championship, but Howard Staunton and Paul Morphy had been unofficially described as "World Chess Champion" around the middle of the 19th century. In fact one of the organizers of the 1851 London International tournament had said the contest was for "the baton of the World's Chess Champion", and in mid-1840s Ludwig Bledow wrote a letter to Tassilo von Heydebrand und der Lasa suggesting they should organize a world championship tournament in Germany. Some commentators described Steinitz as "the champion" in the years following his 1872 match victory against Zukertort. In the late 1870s and early 1880s some regarded Steinitz as the champion and others supported Johannes Zukertort, and the 1886 match was not regarded as creating the title of World Champion, but as resolving conflicting claims to the title. On the other hand George Alcock MacDonnell hailed Joseph Blackburne as "World Champion" for his win in the 1881 Berlin Tournament, George Henry Mackenzie as having "won the Chess Championship of the World" in 1887, and Isidore Gunsberg as "among the champions of the world" following his win at "Bradford Place" in 1888. However, Steinitz regarded G.A. MacDonnell as "one of my bitterest and most untruthful persecutors".

== Personal life ==
Steinitz lived with Caroline Golder (born 1846) in the 1860s, and their only daughter Flora was born in 1866. Flora died in 1888 at the age of 21, and Caroline died in 1892. He married his second wife a few years later, and had two children by her. In 1897 he dedicated a pamphlet to the memory of his first wife and their daughter.

In February 1897, The New York Times prematurely reported his death in a New York mental asylum. Some authors claim that he contracted syphilis, which may have been a cause of the mental breakdowns he suffered in his last years. In the months prior to his death, he spent some time in institutions as a result of his failing mental health. Before his confinement, Steinitz had been attempting to publish an essay calling for the emancipation of Austrian Jews, and Steinitz himself attributed his symptoms entirely to mental fatigue. His chess activities had not yielded any great financial rewards, and he died a pauper in the Manhattan State Hospital (Wards Island) on August 12, 1900, of a heart attack. Steinitz is buried in the Cemetery of the Evergreens in Brooklyn, New York. His second wife and their two young children were still alive at the time of his death.

== Assessment ==
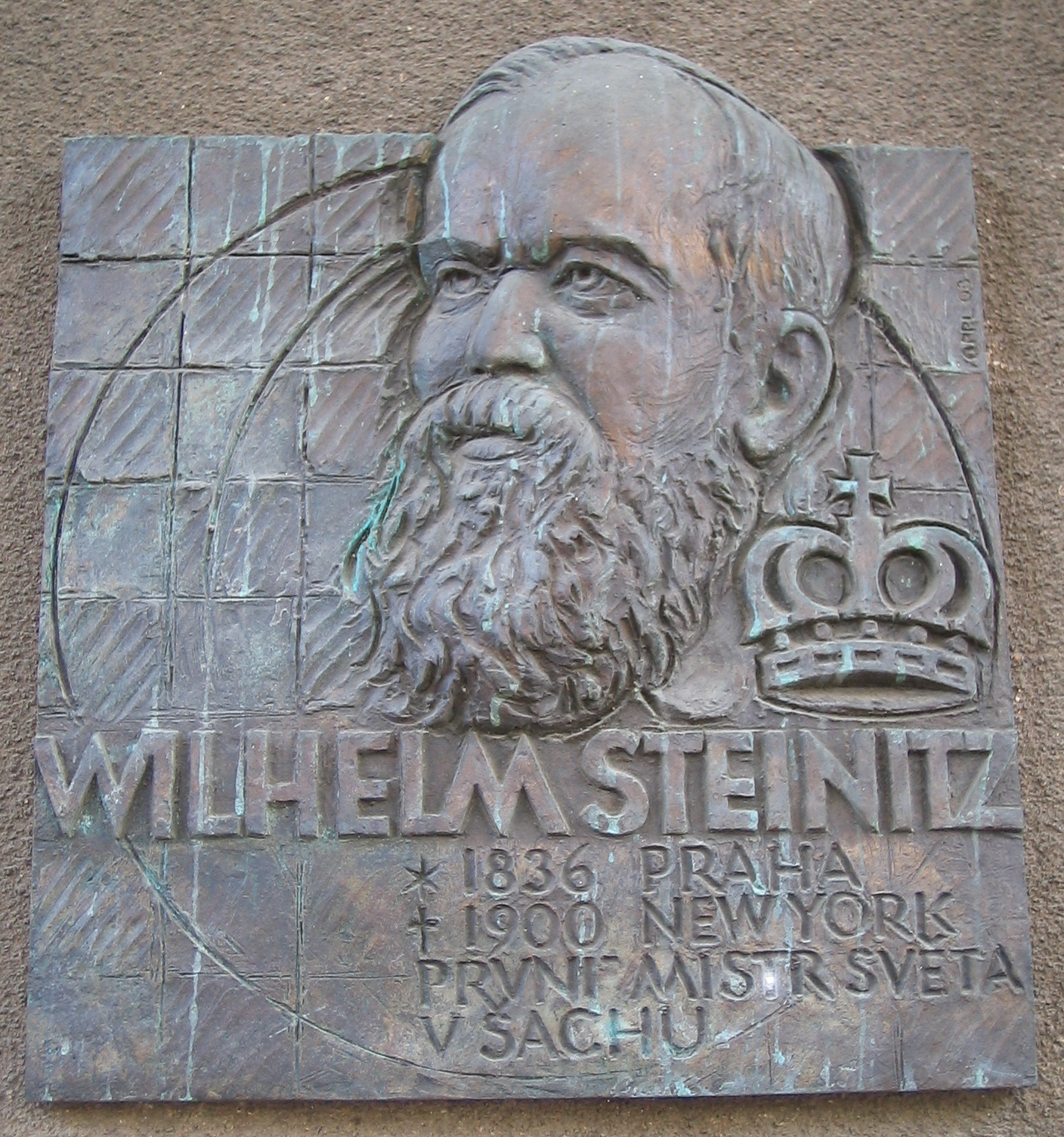
Plaque in honor of Wilhelm Steinitz, in Prague's Josefov district

The book of the Hastings 1895 chess tournament, written collectively by the players, described Steinitz as follows:

Mr. Steinitz stands high as a theoretician and as a writer; he has a powerful pen, and when he chooses can use expressive English. He evidently strives to be fair to friends and foes alike, but appears sometimes to fail to see that after all he is much like many others in this respect. Possessed of a fine intellect, and extremely fond of the game, he is apt to lose sight of all other considerations, people and business alike. Chess is his very life and soul, the one thing for which he lives.

=== Influence on the game ===
Steinitz's play up to and including 1872 was similar to that of his contemporaries: sharp, aggressive, and full of sacrificial play. This was the style in which he became "world number one" by beating Adolf Anderssen in 1866 and confirmed his position by beating Zukertort in 1872 and winning the 1872 London International tournament (Zukertort had claimed the rank of number two by beating Anderssen in 1871).

In 1873, however, Steinitz's play suddenly changed, giving priority to what is now called the positional elements in chess: pawn structure, space, outposts for knights, the advantage of the two bishops, etc. Although Steinitz often accepted unnecessarily difficult defensive positions in order to demonstrate the superiority of his theories, he also showed that his methods could provide a platform for crushing attacks. Steinitz's successor as world champion, Emanuel Lasker, summed up the new style as: "In the beginning of the game ignore the search for combinations, abstain from violent moves, aim for small advantages, accumulate them, and only after having attained these ends search for the combination – and then with all the power of will and intellect, because then the combination must exist, however deeply hidden."

Although Steinitz's play changed abruptly, he said he had been thinking along such lines for some years:

Some of the games which I saw Paulsen play during the London Congress of 1862 gave a still stronger start to the modification of my own opinions, which has since developed, and I began to recognize that Chess genius is not confined to the more or less deep and brilliant finishing strokes after the original balance of power and position has been overthrown, but that it also requires the exercise of still more extraordinary powers, though perhaps of a different kind to maintain that balance or respectively to disturb it at the proper time in one's own favor.

During his nine-year layoff from tournament play (1873–1882) and later in his career, Steinitz used his chess writings to present his theories – while in the UK he wrote for The Field; in 1885 after moving to New York he founded the "International Chess Magazine", of which he was the chief editor; and in 1889 he edited the book of the great New York 1889 tournament (won by Mikhail Chigorin and Max Weiss), in which he did not compete as the tournament was designed to produce his successor as World Champion. Many other writers found his new approach incomprehensible, boring or even cowardly; for example Adolf Anderssen said, "Kolisch is a highwayman and points the pistol at your breast. Steinitz is a pick-pocket, he steals a pawn and wins a game with it."

But when he contested the first World Championship match in 1886 against Johannes Zukertort, it became evident that Steinitz was playing on another level. Although Zukertort was at least Steinitz's equal in spectacular attacking play, Steinitz often outmaneuvered him fairly simply by the use of positional principles.

By the time of his match in 1890–91 against Gunsberg, some commentators showed an understanding of and appreciation for Steinitz's theories. Shortly before the 1894 match with Emanuel Lasker, even the New York Times, which had earlier published attacks on his play and character, paid tribute to his playing record, the importance of his theories, and his sportsmanship in agreeing to the most difficult match of his career despite his previous intention of retiring.

By the end of his career, Steinitz was more highly esteemed as a theoretician than as a player. The comments about him in the book of the Hastings 1895 chess tournament focus on his theories and writings, and Emanuel Lasker was more explicit: "He was a thinker worthy of a seat in the halls of a University. A player, as the world believed he was, he was not; his studious temperament made that impossible; and thus he was conquered by a player ..."

As a result of his play and writings Steinitz, along with Paul Morphy, is considered by many chess commentators to be the founder of modern chess. Lasker, who took the championship from Steinitz, wrote, "I who vanquished him must see to it that his great achievement, his theories should find justice, and I must avenge the wrongs he suffered." Vladimir Kramnik emphasizes Steinitz's importance as a pioneer in the field of chess theory: "Steinitz was the first to realise that chess, despite being a complicated game, obeys some common principles. ... But as often happens the first time is just a try. ... I can't say he was the founder of a chess theory. He was an experimenter and pointed out that chess obeys laws that should be considered."

=== Writings ===
Steinitz was the main chess correspondent of The Field (in London) from 1873 to 1882, and used this to present his ideas about chess strategy. In 1885 he founded the International Chess Magazine in New York City and edited it until 1891. In addition to game commentaries and blow-by-blow accounts of the negotiations leading to his 1886 match with Johann Zukertort and of the American Chess Congress's world championship project, he wrote a long series of articles about Paul Morphy, who had died in 1884. He wrote the book of the 1889 New York tournament, in which he annotated all 432 of the games, and in 1889 he published a textbook, The Modern Chess Instructor.

Steinitz also allegedly wrote a pamphlet entitled Capital, Labor, and Charity while confined at River Crest Sanitarium in New York during the final months of his life.

=== Playing strength and style ===
Steinitz vs. von Bardeleben, 1895

Position: a8 black rook, c8 black rook, e8 black king, a7 black pawn, b7 black pawn, d7 black queen, e7 black knight, h7 black pawn, f6 black pawn, g6 black pawn, d5 black pawn, g5 white knight, g4 white queen, a2 white pawn, b2 white pawn, f2 white pawn, g2 white pawn, h2 white pawn, c1 white rook, e1 white rook, g1 white king

White to move. Steinitz produced this brilliancy at age 59.
22.Rxe7+ Kf8 23.Rf7+ Kg8 24.Rg7+ Kh8 25.Rxh7+ and Black resigned, as White gets a huge advantage or forces mate in 10 moves.

Statistical rating systems are unkind to Steinitz. "Warriors of the Mind" gives him a ranking of 47th, below several obscure Soviet grandmasters; Chessmetrics places him only 15th on its all-time list. Chessmetrics penalizes players who play infrequently; opportunities for competitive chess were infrequent in Steinitz's best years, and Steinitz had a few long absences from competitive play (1873–1876, 1876–1882, 1883–1886, 1886–1889). However, in 2005, Chessmetrics' author, Jeff Sonas, wrote an article which examined various ways of comparing the strength of "world number one" players, using data provided by Chessmetrics, and found that: Steinitz was further ahead of his contemporaries in the 1870s than Bobby Fischer was in his peak period (1970–1972); that Steinitz had the third-highest total number of years as the world's top player, behind Emanuel Lasker and Garry Kasparov; and that Steinitz placed 7th in a comparison of how long players were ranked in the world's top three. Between his victory over Anderssen (1866) and his loss to Emanuel Lasker (1894), Steinitz won all his "normal" matches, sometimes by wide margins; and his worst tournament performance in that 28-year period was third place in Paris (1867). (He also lost two handicap matches and a match by telegraph in 1890 against Mikhail Chigorin, where Chigorin was allowed to choose the openings in both games and won both.) The Edo rating system that covers the years from 1821 to 1937 places Steinitz 3rd in top peak rating; behind Jose Capablanca and Paul Morphy but ahead of Emanuel Lasker and Alexander Alekhine.

Initially Steinitz played in the all-out attacking style of contemporaries like Anderssen, and then changed to the positional style with which he dominated competitive chess in the 1870s and 1880s. Max Euwe wrote, "Steinitz aimed at positions with clear-cut features, to which his theory was best applicable." However, he retained his capacity for brilliant attacks right to the end of his career; for example, in the 1895 Hastings tournament (when he was 59), he beat von Bardeleben in a spectacular game in which in the closing stages Steinitz deliberately exposed all his pieces to attack simultaneously (except his king, of course). His most significant weaknesses were his habits of playing "experimental" moves and getting into unnecessarily difficult defensive positions in top-class competitive games.

=== Personality ===
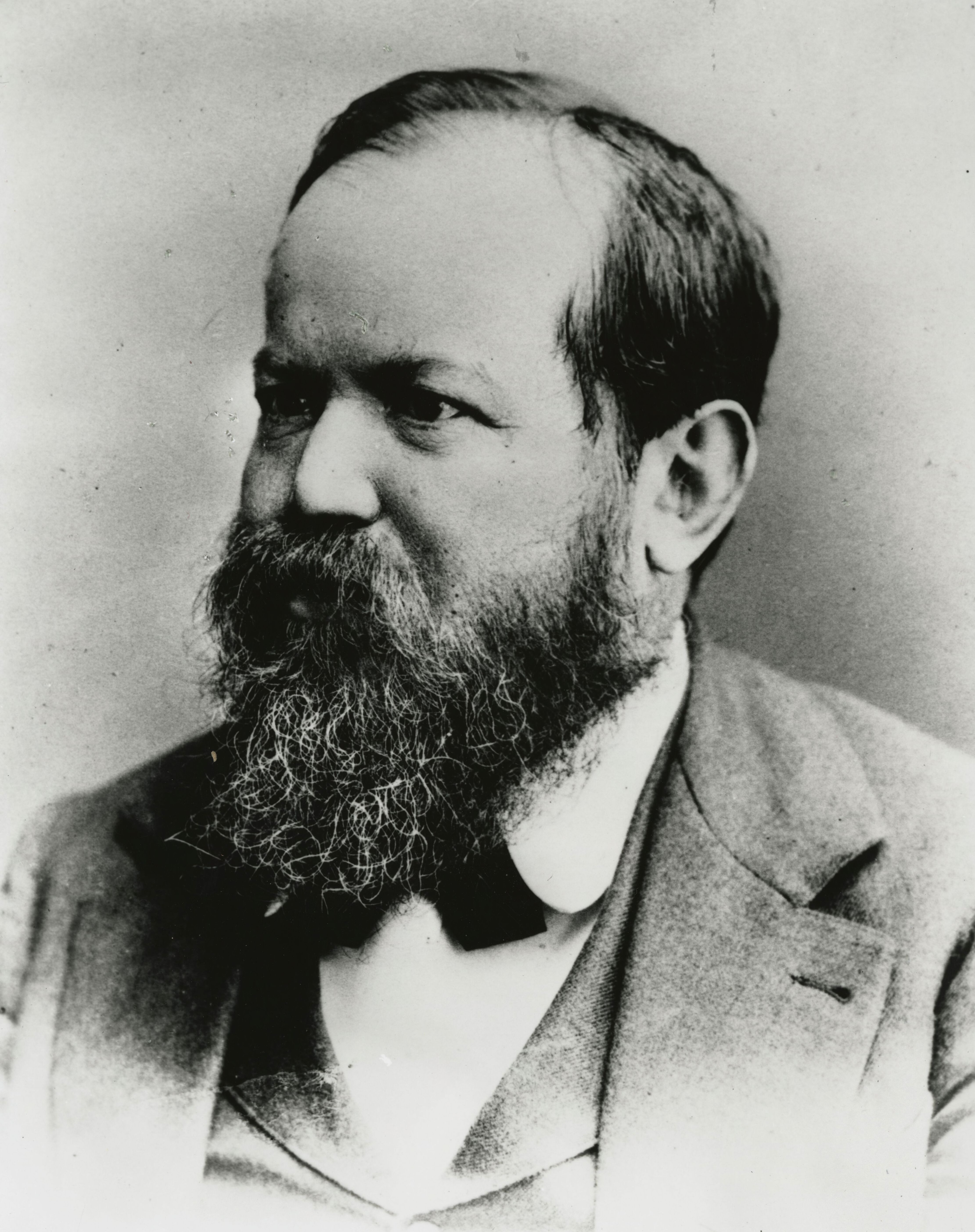
Steinitz

"Traditional" accounts of Steinitz describe him as having a sharp tongue and violent temper, perhaps partly because of his short stature (barely five feet) and congenital lameness. He admitted that "Like the Duke of Parma, I always hold the sword in one hand and the olive branch in the other", and under severe provocation he could become abusive in published articles. He was aware of his own tendencies and said early in his career, "Nothing would induce me to take charge of a chess column ...Because I should be so fair in dispensing blame as well as praise that I should be sure to give offence and make enemies." When he embarked on chess journalism, his brutally frank review of Wormald's The Chess Openings in 1875 proved him right on both counts.

His personal correspondence, his own articles and some third-party articles, however, show that he had long and friendly relationships with many people and groups in the chess world, including Ignác Kolisch (one of his earliest sponsors), Mikhail Chigorin, Harry Nelson Pillsbury, Bernhard Horwitz, Amos Burn and the Cuban and Russian chess communities. He even co-operated with the American Chess Congress in its project to regulate future contests for the world title that he had earned.

Steinitz strove to be objective in his writings about chess competitions and games; for example, he attributed to sheer bad luck a poor tournament score by Henry Edward Bird, whom he considered no friend of his, and was generous in his praise of great play by even his bitter enemies. He could poke fun at some of his own rhetoric; for example: "I remarked that I would rather die in America than live in England. ... I added that I would rather lose a match in America than win one in England. But after having carefully considered the subject in all its bearings, I have come to the conclusion that I neither mean to die yet nor to lose the match." At a joint simultaneous display in Russia around the time of the 1895–96 Saint Petersburg tournament, Emanuel Lasker and Steinitz formed an impromptu comedy double act.

Although he had a strong sense of honour about repaying debts, Steinitz was poor at managing his finances: he let a competitor "poach" many of his clients in 1862–63, offered to play the 1886 world title match against Johannes Zukertort for free, and died in poverty in 1900, leaving his widow to survive by running a small shop.

== Competitive record ==
=== Tournament results ===
Date	Location	Place	Score	Notes
1859	Vienna chess society	3rd	?	Behind Carl Hamppe and Eduard Jenay.
1860	Vienna chess society	2nd	?	Hamppe won.
1861	Vienna chess society	3rd	?	Behind Hamppe and Daniel Harrwitz.
1862	Vienna chess society	1st	30/31	
1862	London International Tournament	6th	8/13	Behind Adolf Anderssen, Louis Paulsen, John Owen, George Alcock MacDonnell and Serafino Dubois. Draws were not scored in this tournament. Steinitz was awarded the brilliancy prize for his win over Augustus Mongredien.
1862	London championship	1st	7/7	
1865	Dublin	1st–2nd	3½/4	Won play-off after tie with G. A. MacDonnell.
1866	London handicap tournament	1st	8/9	Steinitz won against Cecil Valentine De Vere (2–1), MacDonnell (2–0), Mocatta (2–0) – Steinitz gave odds of pawn and move, and in the final S. Green (2–0) – Steinitz gave odds of pawn and two moves.
1867	Dundee handicap tournament	1st–2nd	3/3	Tied with J.C. Fraser. Steinitz won against MacDonnell (1–0), Keating (1–0) – Steinitz gave odds of a knight, and Scott (1–0) – Steinitz gave odds of a knight.
1867	Dundee	2nd	7/9	Behind Neumann (7½/9); ahead of MacDonnell, De Vere, Joseph Henry Blackburne, Robertson, J.C. Fraser, G.B. Fraser, Hamel and Spens.
1867	Paris	3rd	+18−3=3	Draws counted as zero; third behind Ignaz von Kolisch (+20−2=2) and Szymon Winawer (+19−4=1); ahead of Gustav Neumann, De Vere, Jules Arnous de Rivière, Hieronim Czarnowski, Celso Golmayo Zúpide, Samuel Rosenthal, Sam Loyd, D'Andre, Martin Severin From, and Eugène Rousseau.
1870	Baden-Baden	2nd	12½/18	Behind Anderssen (13/18); ahead of Neumann, Blackburne, Louis Paulsen, De Vere, Szymon Winawer, Rosenthal and Johannes von Minckwitz.
1872	London	1st	7½/8	Ahead of Blackburne (5/8), Johannes Zukertort, MacDonnell and De Vere.
1873	Vienna	1st–2nd	10/11: 20½/25	Tied with Blackburne (10/11: 22½/30) and won the play-off 2–0; ahead of Anderssen (8½/11: 19/30), Rosenthal (7½/11: 17/28), Louis Paulsen, Henry Edward Bird, Heral, Max Fleissig, Philipp Meitner, Adolf Schwarz, Oscar Gelbfuhs and Karl Pitschel. This tournament had a very unusual scoring system: each player played a 3-game mini-match with each of the others and scored 1 for a won mini-match and ½ for a drawn mini-match. Steinitz won his last 14 games and therefore completed his mini-matches by playing fewer games than anyone else. The numbers before the colons (:) are the points awarded; the other 2 numbers are the usual "games won / games played" scoring.
1882	Vienna	1st–2nd	24/34	Tied with Winawer and drew the play-off; ahead of Mason (23/34), Zukertort (22½/34), Mackenzie, Blackburne, Berthold Englisch, Paulsen and others including Mikhail Chigorin and Bird.
1883	London	2nd	19/26	Behind Zukertort (22/26); ahead of Blackburne (16½/24), Chigorin 16/24, Englisch (15½/24), Mackenzie (15½/24), Mason (15½/24), Rosenthal, Winawer, Bird and four others.
1894	New York City championship	1st	8½/10	After losing the world title to Emanuel Lasker.
1895	Hastings	5th	13/21	Behind Harry Nelson Pillsbury (16½/21), Chigorin (16/21), Emanuel Lasker (15½/21), Siegbert Tarrasch (14/21); ahead of Emanuel Schiffers (12/21), Curt von Bardeleben (11½/21), Richard Teichmann (11½/21), Carl Schlechter (11/21), Blackburne (10½/21), Carl August Walbrodt, Amos Burn, Dawid Janowski, Mason, Bird, Isidore Gunsberg, Adolf Albin, Georg Marco, William Pollock, Jacques Mieses, Samuel Tinsley and Beniamino Vergani.
1895–96	Saint Petersburg	2nd	9½/18	Behind Emanuel Lasker (11½/18); ahead of Pillsbury (8/18) and Chigorin (7/18). The world's top 4 players played 6 games against each of the others.
1896	Nuremberg	6th	11/18	Behind Emanuel Lasker 13½/18, Géza Maróczy (12½/18), Pillsbury (12/18), Tarrasch (12/18), Janowski (11½/18); ahead of Walbrodt, Schiffers, Chigorin, Blackburne, Rudolf Charousek, Marco, Albin, Winawer, Jackson Showalter, Moritz Porges, Emil Schallopp and Teichmann.
1897	New York	1st–2nd	2½/4	A triangular "Thousand Islands" tournament; tied with S. Lipschütz and ahead of William Ewart Napier.
1898	Vienna	4th	23½/36	Behind Tarrasch (27½/36), Pillsbury (27½/36), Janowski (25½/36); ahead of Schlechter, Chigorin, Burn, Paul Lipke, Maroczy, Simon Alapin, Blackburne, Schiffers, Marco, Showalter, Walbrodt, Alexander Halprin, Horatio Caro, David Graham Baird and Herbert William Trenchard.
1898	Cologne	5th	9½/15	Behind Burn, Charousek, Chigorin and Wilhelm Cohn; ahead of Schlechter, Showalter, Johann Berger, Janowski and Schiffers.
1899	London	10–11th	11½/27	Behind Emanuel Lasker (23½/27), Janowski (19/27), Maróczy (19/27), Pillsbury (19/27), Schlechter (18/27), Blackburne (16½/27), Chigorin (16/27), Showalter (13½/27), Mason (13/27). This was the first time he had not won any prize money since 1859.

=== Match results ===
Date	Opponent	Result	Location	Score		Notes
1860	Eduard Jenay	Drew	Vienna	2/4	2 : 2	
1860	Lang	Won	Vienna	3/3	+3−0=0	
1862	Serafino Dubois	Won	London	5½/9	+5−3=1	
1862	Adolf Anderssen	Lost	London	1/3	+1−2=0	Offhand games
1862–63	Joseph Henry Blackburne	Won	London	8/10	+7−1=2	Only 2 years after Blackburne started playing chess
1863	Frederick Deacon	Won	London	5½/7	+5−1=1	
1863	Augustus Mongredien	Won	London	7/7	+7−0=0	
1863–64	Valentine Green	Won	London	8/9	+7−0=2	
1865	James Robey	Won	London	4/5	4 : 1	Probably not a formal match
1866	Adolf Anderssen	Won	London	8/14	+8−6=0	As a result of this win Steinitz was generally regarded as the world's best player.
1866	Henry Edward Bird	Won	London	9½/17	+7−5=5	Bird was forced to discontinue match when sent on business to America.
1867	George Brunton Fraser	Won	Dundee	4/6	+3−1=2	
1870	Blackburne	Won	London	1½/2	+1−0=1	
1872	Johannes Zukertort	Won	London	9/12	+7−1=4	
1873	Blackburne	Won	Vienna	2/2	+2−0=0	Play-off match
1876	Blackburne	Won	London	7/7	+7−0=0	
1882	Szymon Winawer	Drew	Vienna	1/2	1 : 1	Play-off match
1882	Dion Martinez	Won	Philadelphia	7/7	+7−0=0	
1882	Alexander Sellman	Won	Baltimore	3½/5	+2−0=3	
1883	George Henry Mackenzie	Won	New York City	4/6	+3−1=2	
1883	Martinez	Won	Philadelphia	4½/7	+3−1=3	
1883	Celso Golmayo Zúpide	Won	Havana	9/11	9 : 2	
1883	Martinez	Won	Philadelphia	10/11	10 : 1	
1885	Alexander Sellman	Won	Baltimore	3/3	+3−0=0	
1886	Zukertort	Won	New York, St. Louis and New Orleans	12½/20	+10−5=5	World Chess Championship 1886; the contract for this match said it was "for the Championship of the World".
1888	Alberto Ponce	Won	Havana	4/5	4 : 1	
1888	Andrés Vásquez	Won	Havana	5/5	+5−0=0	
1888	Golmayo	Won	Havana	5/5	+5−0=0	
1889	Vicente Carvajal	Won	Havana	4/5	4 : 1	
1889	Mikhail Chigorin	Won	Havana	10½/17	+10−6=1	World Chess Championship 1889; often described as a World Championship match, but may not have been
1890–91	Isidor Gunsberg	Won	New York	10½/19	+6−4=9	World Chess Championship 1891 match
1892	Chigorin	Won	Havana	12½/23	+10−8=5	World Chess Championship 1892 match
1894	Emanuel Lasker	Lost	New York, Philadelphia and Montreal	7/19	+5−10=4	World Chess Championship 1894 match; Steinitz's first recorded defeat in a serious match
1896	Emanuel Schiffers	Won	Rostov-on-Don	6½/11	+6−4=1	
1896–97	Lasker	Lost	Moscow	4½/17	+2−10=5	World Chess Championship 1897 match
1897	S. Lipschütz	Drew	New York	1/2	1 : 1	Play-off match

== Notable games ==
- Steinitz vs. Augustus Mongredien, London 1862. Awarded the brilliancy prize at the 1862 London International Tournament.
- Adolf Anderssen vs. Steinitz; 13th match game, London 1866. Emanuel Lasker regarded this well-prepared attack as a precursor of the positional approach that Steinitz later advocated.
- Johannes Zukertort vs. Steinitz, WCH (9th game of the match) 1886, Queen's Gambit Declined: Vienna. Quiet Variation (D37), 0–1. Steinitz exchanges his powerful centre to create two weak hanging pawns on White's queenside and creates strong pressure against them. Zukertort eventually tries to slug his way out of trouble, but Steinitz wins with a sharp counterattack.
- Steinitz vs. Mikhail Chigorin, Havana WCH 1892 (16th game of the match), Ruy Lopez, 1–0. Steinitz weakens Chigorin's pawns, gains superior mobility then forces a pawn promotion with the aid of a little combination.
- Steinitz vs. Mikhail Chigorin, Havana WCH 1892 (4th game of the match), Spanish Game: General (C65), 1–0. Positional preparation creates the opportunity for a swift attack leading to mate on the 29th move.
- Steinitz vs. Curt von Bardeleben, Hastings 1895, Italian Game: Classical Variation. Greco Gambit Traditional Line (C54), 1–0. A great attacking combination in the old 1860s style. After White's 22nd move, all the white pieces are en prise but Black is lost. The game won the first brilliancy prize of the tournament.

== See also ==
- List of Jewish chess players
- Steinitz Memorial, a blitz chess tournament held from May 15 to 17, 2020, in honor of Wilhelm Steinitz
- Steinitz Variation

Preceded by (unofficial)	World Chess Champion; 1886–1894	Succeeded by Emanuel Lasker
