= Charles Woodbury =

Charles Woodbury may refer to:

- Charles Herbert Woodbury (1864–1942), American marine painter
- Charles Johnson Woodbury (1844–1927), lecturer on poetry & literature
- Charles L. Woodbury (1820–1898), American lawyer and politician
