= Frederick Deacon =

British chess master (1829–1875)

Frederick Horace Deacon (January 1829 – 20 November 1875, in Brixton, London) was a British chess master. He is mainly notable for spurious claims to have drawn against Paul Morphy, making himself both notorious and unpopular.

He won a match against W. Gilby (2–1) and lost a match to Charles Edward Ranken (0–2) at London 1851 (Provincial, Samuel Boden won). Deacon won matches against Edward Löwe (7½–2½) in 1851, and Carl Mayet (5–2) in 1852. He claimed to have drawn against Paul Morphy (1–1) in 1858.

He took 2nd, behind George Henry Mackenzie, at London 1862 (handicap), shared 11th at London 1862 (the 5th BCA Congress, Adolf Anderssen won), and lost a match to Wilhelm Steinitz (1½–5½) at London 1863.
