= Barnes Opening =

Position: a8 black rook, b8 black knight, c8 black bishop, d8 black queen, e8 black king, f8 black bishop, g8 black knight, h8 black rook, a7 black pawn, b7 black pawn, c7 black pawn, d7 black pawn, e7 black pawn, f7 black pawn, g7 black pawn, h7 black pawn, f3 white pawn, a2 white pawn, b2 white pawn, c2 white pawn, d2 white pawn, e2 white pawn, g2 white pawn, h2 white pawn, a1 white rook, b1 white knight, c1 white bishop, d1 white queen, e1 white king, f1 white bishop, g1 white knight, h1 white rook
- Moves: 1.f3
- ECO: A00
- Named after: Thomas Wilson Barnes

The Barnes Opening (sometimes called Gedult's Opening) is a chess opening where White opens with:

1. f3

The opening is named after Thomas Wilson Barnes (1825–1874), an English player who had an impressive eight wins over Paul Morphy, including one game where Barnes answered 1.e4 with 1...f6, known as the Barnes Defence.

Along with several other uncommon first moves, it is classified under the code A00 (irregular openings or uncommon openings) in the Encyclopaedia of Chess Openings.

== Strategy ==
Of the twenty possible first moves in chess, author and grandmaster Edmar Mednis argues that 1.f3 is the worst. Grandmaster Benjamin Finegold teaches "Never play f3". In his text on openings, Paul van der Sterren considered 1.f3 beneath mention by name:

Then there are those moves with which White really tries to shoot himself in the foot, like 1.f3 or 1.g4. Out of loyalty to those unfortunates who have occasionally indulged in these strange moves in their youth, I shall not even give you the names of these 'openings'.

— van der Sterren, on 1.f3

The move does exert influence over the central square e4, but the same or more ambitious goals can be achieved with almost any other first move. The move 1.f3 does not develop a piece, opens no lines for pieces, and actually hinders the development of White's king knight by denying it its most natural square, f3. It also weakens White's kingside pawn structure, opens the e1–h4 diagonal against White's uncastled king, and opens the g1–a7 diagonal against White's potential kingside castling position.

Since 1.f3 is a poor move, it is not played often. Nonetheless, it is probably not the rarest opening move. After 1.f3 e5 some players even continue with the nonsensical 2.Kf2, one of several sequences of opening moves known as the Bongcloud Attack. It is also known as the Fried Fox Attack, Wandering King Opening, The Hammerschlag, Tumbleweed, the Pork Chop Opening, or the Half Bird as it is often called in the United Kingdom, due to its opening move f3 being half that of the f4 employed in Bird's Opening. One example of this is the game Simon Williams beating Martin Simons in the last round of the British Championship 1999, where Williams had nothing to play for. In 2020, Magnus Carlsen played 2.Kf2 against Wesley So in a blitz game, for the psychological effect. So commented, "It's hard to forget the game when someone plays f3 and Kf2 and just crushes you. That's so humiliating." Also played is 2.e4, called the King's Head Opening.

Black can secure a comfortable advantage by the normal means – advancing central pawns and rapidly developing pieces to assert control over the centre. If Black replies 1...e5, the game might proceed into a passive line known as the Blue Moon Defence. It usually occurs after the moves 1.f3 e5 2.Nh3 d5 3.Nf2 (avoiding 3...Bxh3 4.gxh3 weakening the kingside) 3...Nf6 4.e3 Nc6 5.Be2 Bc5 6.0-0 0-0. White has no stake in the centre, but hopes to make a hole to break into.

If White plays poorly and leaves too many lines open against their king after 2.Kf2, they might be quickly checkmated. One example: 1.f3 d5 2.Kf2 e5 (Black places two pawns in the centre to prepare for quick development) 3.e4 Bc5+ 4.Kg3 Qg5#.

== Fool's mate ==
Position: a8 black rook, b8 black knight, c8 black bishop, e8 black king, f8 black bishop, g8 black knight, h8 black rook, a7 black pawn, b7 black pawn, c7 black pawn, d7 black pawn, f7 black pawn, g7 black pawn, h7 black pawn, e5 black pawn, g4 white pawn, h4 black queen, f3 white pawn, a2 white pawn, b2 white pawn, c2 white pawn, d2 white pawn, e2 white pawn, h2 white pawn, a1 white rook, b1 white knight, c1 white bishop, d1 white queen, e1 white king, f1 white bishop, g1 white knight, h1 white rook

The Barnes Opening can lead to the fool's mate: 1.f3 e5 2.g4 Qh4#. Of all of White's legal moves after 1.f3 e5, only one allows mate in one, while another, 2.h3, allows mate in two: 2...Qh4+ 3.g3 Qxg3#.

== See also ==
- Barnes Defence
- List of chess openings
- List of chess openings named after people
