= Jules Arnous de Rivière =

French chess player (1830–1905)

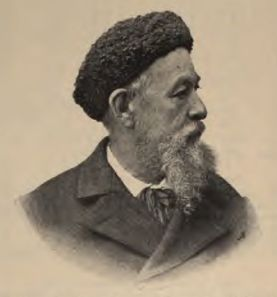
Jules Arnous de Rivière in 1904

Jules Arnous de Rivière (4 May 1830 – 11 September 1905) was the strongest French chess player from the late 1850s through the late 1870s. He is best known today for playing many games with Paul Morphy when the American champion visited Paris in 1858 and 1863.

Born in Nantes to a French father William Henri Arnous-Rivière and an Irish mother Marie Tobin. His grandfather baron Jean-Joseph Arnous-Rivière from an old Breton family of Nantes have been ennobled by king Charles X in 1828.

Arnous-Rivière finished sixth of 13 in the 1867 Paris international tournament organized in conjunction with the Exposition Universelle. Although he finished well below the strongest foreign masters, he was ahead of fellow Parisian, Polish-born Samuel Rosenthal. Arnous-Rivière had success in some minor tournaments in Paris: third in 1880, 2nd= in 1881, second in 1882–3, and third in the Café de la Régence tournament of 1896.

Arnous-Rivière fared poorly in his casual games against Morphy, but did well in more formal match play. He lost to Serafino Dubois (+8-21=3) in 1855, and Gustav Neumann (+3-7=2) in 1864, but he drew with Ignatz von Kolisch (5:5) in 1859, and defeated Thomas Wilson Barnes in London (+5−2=0) and Paul Journoud in Paris (+7−2=1) in 1860, and Johann Löwenthal (+2−0=0) in Paris in 1867. He also lost a close match to Mikhail Chigorin by +4−5=1 in 1883.

Arnous-Rivière's writings included several chess columns and books on billiards and roulette. He also invented many games.

He married 27 October 1858 to Joséphine de Coulhac Mazérieux (1834–1921) and had three children: William Arnous-Rivière (1860–1904), Hélène Arnous-Rivière (1862–?) and Jacques Arnous-Rivière (1874–1919). Hélène Arnous-Rivière married Baron Christian-Hubert von Pfeffel; her great-grandson is British politician Stanley Johnson, father of former British Prime Minister Boris Johnson.

Arnous-Rivière died in Paris in 1905.

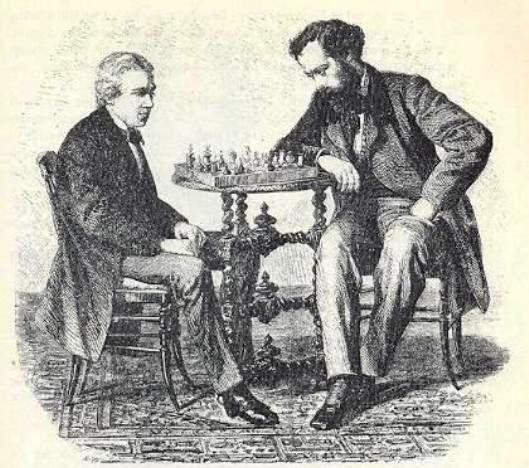
De Rivière (right) playing with Paul Morphy, Paris 1858
