= Paul Journoud =

French chess player and editor

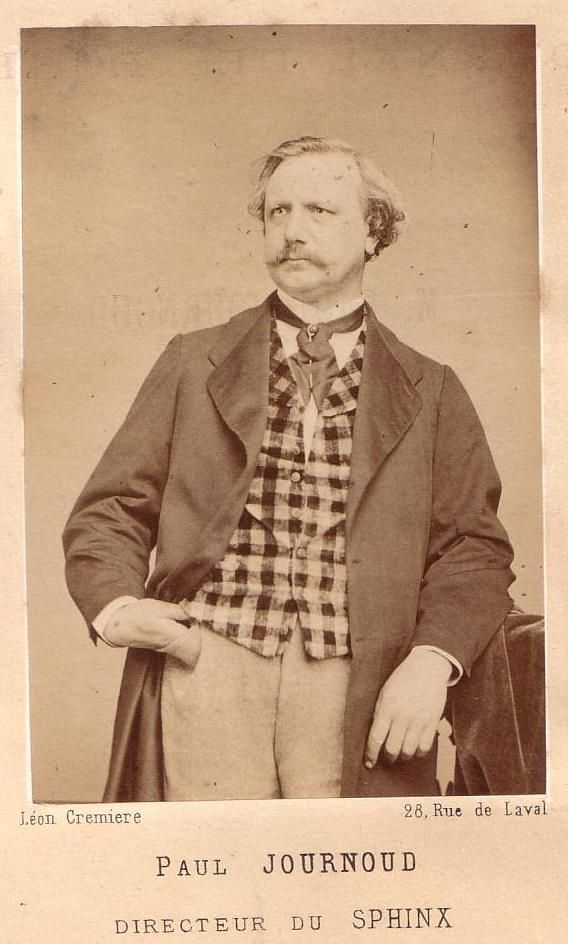
Paul Journoud.

Paul Journoud (January 1821, Lyon – December 1882, Paris) was a French chess master and editor.

He was a member of the Café de la Régence chess club in Paris, and one of leading French masters in the 1850s/1860s. Journoud lost all games to Paul Morphy, which all took place during his first visit in Paris in 1858, although won a consultation game against the American grandmaster playing together with Jules Arnous de Rivière. He lost matches against de Rivière (+4 –9 =2) at Paris 1859, and Adolf Anderssen (+1 –3 =1) at Paris 1860. Among others, he played an equal match with Alexander Petrov at Paris 1863.

He was an editor of several chess periodicals: La Régence (1860), La Nouvelle Régence (1861–1864), Le Palamède Français (1864), and Le Sphinx (1865–1867).
