= Steinitz Memorial =

Chess tournament

The Steinitz Memorial was a blitz chess tournament held from May 15 to May 17, 2020, in honor of the first recognized world chess champion Wilhelm Steinitz. The prize pool was €30,000.

Grandmasters participated in the tournament, among men Magnus Carlsen, Alexander Grischuk, Bu Xiangzhi, Peter Svidler, Jeffery Xiong, Daniil Dubov, Shakhriyar Mamedyarov, Lê Quang Liêm, Anton Korobov, David Antón Guijarro; among women are Ekaterina Lagno, Lei Tingjie, Alexandra Kosteniuk, Tan Zhongyi, Antoaneta Stefanova, Marie Sebag, Zhansaya Abdumalik, Elisabeth Pähtz, Deysi Cori.

The tournament was held on the technical site of Chess24.com. The winner among men was then-world chess champion Magnus Carlsen, among women — Ekaterina Lagno.

== Links ==
- Carlsen and Lagno win FIDE Online Steinitz Memorial
