= John Owen (chess player) =

English cleric and chess player (1827–1901)

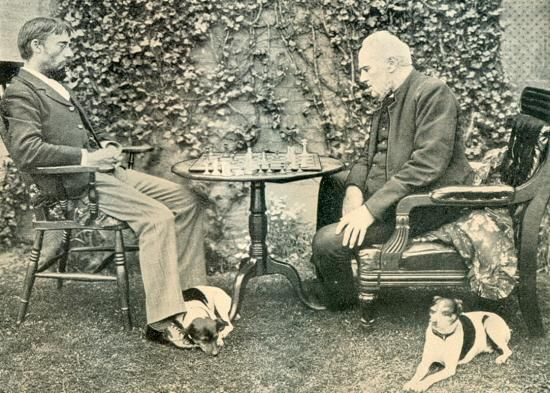
Burn and Owen

John Owen (8 April 1827 – 24 November 1901) was an English vicar and amateur chess master. He ranked among the world's top ten chess players for certain periods of the 1860s. He was a major figure in English chess from the mid-1850s to the 1890s.

== Biography ==
Owen was born in Marchington, and obtained his early schooling at Repton School, Derbyshire. In 1850 he graduated from Trinity College, Cambridge, and received his M.A. from Cambridge three years later. He was ordained by the Church of England in 1851, and served as perpetual curate of Hooton, Cheshire from 1862 to his retirement in 1900.

In 1858 he won a chess game against the young American master Paul Morphy, the world's best player, who was then touring Europe. This led to a match between the two. Despite being given odds of pawn and the move (meaning he started the game with an extra pawn and always moved first), Owen lost the match 6–1, never winning a game.

His performance in the very strong 1862 London tournament, the first international round-robin event (in which each participant plays every other) was more impressive. He finished third, ahead of future world champion Wilhelm Steinitz, and was the only player to win against the eventual tournament winner, Adolf Anderssen. Louis Paulsen placed second. This result was arguably Owen's top lifetime chess achievement.

Owen continued to play frequently and often successfully in British tournaments into the 1890s, and performed strongly in several matches against top British players, who were essentially chess professionals. He never competed outside the British Isles. He died in Twickenham.

== Legacy ==
Owen is the eponym of Owen's Defence, a chess opening characterised by the moves 1.e4 b6. Owen was the first strong player to play this frequently, including in his victory over Morphy.
