= Eduard Jenay =

Austrian chess player

Eduard Jenay was an Austrian chess master.

Jenay was a Viennese liberal who played at Café bei Neuner in der Plankengassecafé, while conservatives and military officers would never enter it in the 1840s.

He lost matches to Adolf Anderssen (3.5 : 4.5) at London 1851, and Ignatz von Kolisch (1 : 7) at Vienna 1859, and drew with Wilhelm Steinitz (2 : 2) at Vienna 1860. He took second, behind Carl Hamppe and ahead of Steinitz, at Vienna (Wiener Schachgesellschaft) 1859.
