= Alexander Beaufort Meek =

American politician

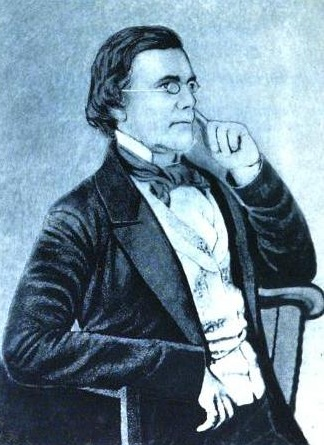
Alexander Beaufort Meek

Alexander Beaufort Meek (July 17, 1814 (Columbia, South Carolina) – November 1, 1865 (Columbus, Mississippi) was an American politician, lawyer, judge, and chess player. He also was a writer of historical and literary essays, and poetry. He served as Alabama Attorney General in 1836. He played several chess games against Paul Morphy.

== Works ==
- An Oration Delivered before the Society of the Alumni of the University of Alabama at its First Anniversary, December 17, 1836
- The South West: Its History, Character, and Prospects: A Discourse for the Eighth Anniversary of the Erosophic Society of the University of Alabama, December 7, 1839, Tuscaloosa, C. B. Baldwin, Press, 1840, 40 p.
- Americanism in Literature. An Oration before the Phi Kappa and Demosthenian Societies of the University of Georgia, at Athens, August 8, 1844, Charleston, Burges and James, printers, 1844, 39 p.
- The Red Eagle: A Poem of the South, New York, D. Appleton & Company, 1855, 108 p.
  - Montgomery, Ala., The Paragon Press, 1914
- Romantic Passages in Southwestern History: Including Orations, Sketches, and Essays, New York, Mobile, S.H. Goetzel & Company, 1857, 330 p.
  - Spartanburg, S.C. : Reprint Company, 1975
- Songs and Poems of the South, New York Mobile, Alabama: S. H. Goetzel & Company, 1857, 282 p.

Legal offices
Preceded by Peter Martin	Attorney General of Alabama; 1836	Succeeded by John D. Phelan
