= Steinitz Variation =

Chess openings

The name Steinitz Variation (or similar) is applied to several chess openings introduced and practiced, or adopted and advocated by Wilhelm Steinitz, the first officially recognized World Chess Champion.

== Openings ==
- Steinitz Variation in the Caro–Kann Defence: 1.e4 c6 2.d4 d5 3.Nc3 dxe4 4.Nxe4 Nd7 (Note: Also called the Nimzowitsch Variation or the Smyslov Variation.)
- Steinitz Variation in the Evans Gambit: 1.e4 e5 2.Nf3 Nc6 3.Bc4 Bc5 4.b4 Bxb4 5.c3 Bc5 6.d4 exd4 7.0-0 d6 8.cxd4 Bb6 9.Nc3 Na5 10.Bg5 f6 11.Be3
- Steinitz Variation in the Evans Gambit: 1.e4 e5 2.Nf3 Nc6 3.Bc4 Bc5 4.b4 Bxb4 5.c3 Ba5 6.0-0 Qf6
- Steinitz Variation in the French Defence: 1.e4 e6 2.d4 d5 3.Nc3 Nf6 4.e5
- Steinitz Variation in the French Defence: 1.e4 e6 2.d4 d5 3.e5 c5 4.dxc5
- Steinitz Attack in the French Defence: 1.e4 e6 2.e5
- Steinitz Defence to the Giuoco Piano: 1.e4 e5 2.Nf3 Nc6 3.Bc4 Bc5 4.0-0 Nf6 5.d3 d6 6.Bg5 h6 7.Bh4 g5
- Steinitz Variation in the Giuoco Piano: 1.e4 e5 2.Nf3 Nc6 3.Bc4 Bc5 4.c3 Nf6 5.d4 exd4 6.cxd4 Bb4+ 7.Nc3 Nxe4 8.0-0 Bxc3 9.bxc3 d5 10.Ba3
- Steinitz Variation in the King's Gambit: 1.e4 e5 2.f4 exf4 3.Bc4 Ne7
- Steinitz Attack in the Petrov's Defence: 1.e4 e5 2.Nf3 Nf6 3.d4
- Steinitz Variation in the Petrov's Defence: 1.e4 e5 2.Nf3 Nf6 3.d4 exd4 4.e5 Ne4 5.Qe2
- Steinitz Variation in the Philidor Defence: 1.e4 e5 2.Nf3 d6 3.Bc4 Be7 4.c3
- Steinitz Variation in the Ponziani Opening: 1.e4 e5 2.Nf3 Nc6 3.c3 d5 4.Qa4 f6
- Steinitz Variation in the Queen's Gambit Accepted: 1.d4 d5 2.c4 dxc4 3.Nf3 Nf6 4.e3 e6 5.Bxc4 c5 6.0-0 cxd4
- Steinitz Countergambit in the Queen's Pawn Game: 1.d4 d5 2.Bf4 c5
- Steinitz Defence to the Ruy Lopez: 1.e4 e5 2.Nf3 Nc6 3.Bb5 d6
- Steinitz Defence Deferred to the Ruy Lopez: 1.e4 e5 2.Nf3 Nc6 3.Bb5 a6 4.Ba4 d6
- Steinitz Defence Doubly Deferred to the Ruy Lopez: 1.e4 e5 2.Nf3 Nc6 3.Bb5 a6 4.Ba4 Nf6 5.0-0 d6 (Note: Also called the Russian Defence.)
- Steinitz Variation in the Scotch Game: 1.e4 e5 2.Nf3 Nc6 3.d4 exd4 4.Nxd4 Qh4 (Note: Steinitz favored this move and it is commonly identified as a Steinitz Variation in books; however, it originated with English player Wellington Pulling in the 1830s and is named the Pulling Counterattack.) 5.Nc3
- Steinitz Variation in the Sicilian Defence: 1.e4 c5 2.g3
- Steinitz Variation in the Three Knights Opening: 1.e4 e5 2.Nf3 Nc6 3.Nc3 g6
- Steinitz Variation in the Two Knights Defense: 1.e4 e5 2.Nf3 Nc6 3.Bc4 Nf6 4.Ng5 d5 5.exd5 Na5 6.Bb5+ c6 7.dxc6 bxc6 8.Be2 h6 9.Nh3
- Steinitz Variation in the Vienna Game: 1.e4 e5 2.Nc3 Nf6 3.f4 d5 4.d3
- Steinitz Gambit in the Vienna Game: 1.e4 e5 2.Nc3 Nc6 3.f4 exf4 4.d4

== Illustrations ==
Steinitz Variation
in the Caro–Kann Defence

Position: a8 black rook, c8 black bishop, d8 black queen, e8 black king, f8 black bishop, g8 black knight, h8 black rook, a7 black pawn, b7 black pawn, d7 black knight, e7 black pawn, f7 black pawn, g7 black pawn, h7 black pawn, c6 black pawn, d4 white pawn, e4 white knight, a2 white pawn, b2 white pawn, c2 white pawn, f2 white pawn, g2 white pawn, h2 white pawn, a1 white rook, c1 white bishop, d1 white queen, e1 white king, f1 white bishop, g1 white knight, h1 white rook

1.e4 c6 2.d4 d5 3.Nc3 dxe4 4.Nxe4 Nd7 (also called the Nimzowitsch Variation or the Smyslov Variation)
Steinitz Variation
in the Evans Gambit

Position: a8 black rook, c8 black bishop, d8 black queen, e8 black king, g8 black knight, h8 black rook, a7 black pawn, b7 black pawn, c7 black pawn, g7 black pawn, h7 black pawn, b6 black bishop, d6 black pawn, f6 black pawn, a5 black knight, c4 white bishop, d4 white pawn, e4 white pawn, c3 white knight, e3 white bishop, f3 white knight, a2 white pawn, f2 white pawn, g2 white pawn, h2 white pawn, a1 white rook, d1 white queen, f1 white rook, g1 white king

1.e4 e5 2.Nf3 Nc6 3.Bc4 Bc5 4.b4 Bxb4 5.c3 Bc5 6.d4 exd4 7.0-0 d6 8.cxd4 Bb6 9.Nc3 Na5 10.Bg5 f6 11.Be3
Steinitz Variation
in the Evans Gambit

Position: a8 black rook, c8 black bishop, e8 black king, g8 black knight, h8 black rook, a7 black pawn, b7 black pawn, c7 black pawn, d7 black pawn, f7 black pawn, g7 black pawn, h7 black pawn, c6 black knight, f6 black queen, a5 black bishop, e5 black pawn, c4 white bishop, e4 white pawn, c3 white pawn, f3 white knight, a2 white pawn, d2 white pawn, f2 white pawn, g2 white pawn, h2 white pawn, a1 white rook, b1 white knight, c1 white bishop, d1 white queen, f1 white rook, g1 white king

1.e4 e5 2.Nf3 Nc6 3.Bc4 Bc5 4.b4 Bxb4 5.c3 Ba5 6.0-0 Qf6
Steinitz Variation
in the French Defence

Position: a8 black rook, b8 black knight, c8 black bishop, d8 black queen, e8 black king, f8 black bishop, h8 black rook, a7 black pawn, b7 black pawn, c7 black pawn, f7 black pawn, g7 black pawn, h7 black pawn, e6 black pawn, f6 black knight, d5 black pawn, e5 white pawn, d4 white pawn, c3 white knight, a2 white pawn, b2 white pawn, c2 white pawn, f2 white pawn, g2 white pawn, h2 white pawn, a1 white rook, c1 white bishop, d1 white queen, e1 white king, f1 white bishop, g1 white knight, h1 white rook

1.e4 e6 2.d4 d5 3.Nc3 Nf6 4.e5
Steinitz Variation
in the French Defence

Position: a8 black rook, b8 black knight, c8 black bishop, d8 black queen, e8 black king, f8 black bishop, g8 black knight, h8 black rook, a7 black pawn, b7 black pawn, f7 black pawn, g7 black pawn, h7 black pawn, e6 black pawn, c5 white pawn, d5 black pawn, e5 white pawn, a2 white pawn, b2 white pawn, c2 white pawn, f2 white pawn, g2 white pawn, h2 white pawn, a1 white rook, b1 white knight, c1 white bishop, d1 white queen, e1 white king, f1 white bishop, g1 white knight, h1 white rook

1.e4 e6 2.d4 d5 3.e5 c5 4.dxc5
Steinitz Attack
in the French Defence

Position: a8 black rook, b8 black knight, c8 black bishop, d8 black queen, e8 black king, f8 black bishop, g8 black knight, h8 black rook, a7 black pawn, b7 black pawn, c7 black pawn, d7 black pawn, f7 black pawn, g7 black pawn, h7 black pawn, e6 black pawn, e5 white pawn, a2 white pawn, b2 white pawn, c2 white pawn, d2 white pawn, f2 white pawn, g2 white pawn, h2 white pawn, a1 white rook, b1 white knight, c1 white bishop, d1 white queen, e1 white king, f1 white bishop, g1 white knight, h1 white rook

1.e4 e6 2.e5
Steinitz Defence
to the Giuoco Piano

Position: a8 black rook, c8 black bishop, d8 black queen, e8 black king, h8 black rook, a7 black pawn, b7 black pawn, c7 black pawn, f7 black pawn, c6 black knight, d6 black pawn, f6 black knight, h6 black pawn, c5 black bishop, e5 black pawn, g5 black pawn, c4 white bishop, e4 white pawn, h4 white bishop, d3 white pawn, f3 white knight, a2 white pawn, b2 white pawn, c2 white pawn, f2 white pawn, g2 white pawn, h2 white pawn, a1 white rook, b1 white knight, d1 white queen, f1 white rook, g1 white king

1.e4 e5 2.Nf3 Nc6 3.Bc4 Bc5 4.0-0 Nf6 5.d3 d6 6.Bg5 h6 7.Bh4 g5
Steinitz Variation
in the Giuoco Piano

Position: a8 black rook, c8 black bishop, d8 black queen, e8 black king, h8 black rook, a7 black pawn, b7 black pawn, c7 black pawn, f7 black pawn, g7 black pawn, h7 black pawn, c6 black knight, d5 black pawn, c4 white bishop, d4 white pawn, e4 black knight, a3 white bishop, c3 white pawn, f3 white knight, a2 white pawn, f2 white pawn, g2 white pawn, h2 white pawn, a1 white rook, d1 white queen, f1 white rook, g1 white king

1.e4 e5 2.Nf3 Nc6 3.Bc4 Bc5 4.c3 Nf6 5.d4 exd4 6.cxd4 Bb4+ 7.Nc3 Nxe4 8.0-0 Bxc3 9.bxc3 d5 10.Ba3
Steinitz Variation
in the King's Gambit

Position: a8 black rook, b8 black knight, c8 black bishop, d8 black queen, e8 black king, f8 black bishop, h8 black rook, a7 black pawn, b7 black pawn, c7 black pawn, d7 black pawn, e7 black knight, f7 black pawn, g7 black pawn, h7 black pawn, c4 white bishop, e4 white pawn, f4 black pawn, a2 white pawn, b2 white pawn, c2 white pawn, d2 white pawn, g2 white pawn, h2 white pawn, a1 white rook, b1 white knight, c1 white bishop, d1 white queen, e1 white king, g1 white knight, h1 white rook

1.e4 e5 2.f4 exf4 3.Bc4 Ne7
Steinitz Attack
in the Petrov's Defence

Position: a8 black rook, b8 black knight, c8 black bishop, d8 black queen, e8 black king, f8 black bishop, h8 black rook, a7 black pawn, b7 black pawn, c7 black pawn, d7 black pawn, f7 black pawn, g7 black pawn, h7 black pawn, f6 black knight, e5 black pawn, d4 white pawn, e4 white pawn, f3 white knight, a2 white pawn, b2 white pawn, c2 white pawn, f2 white pawn, g2 white pawn, h2 white pawn, a1 white rook, b1 white knight, c1 white bishop, d1 white queen, e1 white king, f1 white bishop, h1 white rook

1.e4 e5 2.Nf3 Nf6 3.d4
Steinitz Variation
in the Petrov's Defence

Position: a8 black rook, b8 black knight, c8 black bishop, d8 black queen, e8 black king, f8 black bishop, h8 black rook, a7 black pawn, b7 black pawn, c7 black pawn, d7 black pawn, f7 black pawn, g7 black pawn, h7 black pawn, e5 white pawn, d4 black pawn, e4 black knight, f3 white knight, a2 white pawn, b2 white pawn, c2 white pawn, e2 white queen, f2 white pawn, g2 white pawn, h2 white pawn, a1 white rook, b1 white knight, c1 white bishop, e1 white king, f1 white bishop, h1 white rook

1.e4 e5 2.Nf3 Nf6 3.d4 exd4 4.e5 Ne4 5.Qe2
Steinitz Variation
in the Philidor Defence

Position: a8 black rook, b8 black knight, c8 black bishop, d8 black queen, e8 black king, g8 black knight, h8 black rook, a7 black pawn, b7 black pawn, c7 black pawn, e7 black bishop, f7 black pawn, g7 black pawn, h7 black pawn, d6 black pawn, e5 black pawn, c4 white bishop, e4 white pawn, c3 white pawn, f3 white knight, a2 white pawn, b2 white pawn, d2 white pawn, f2 white pawn, g2 white pawn, h2 white pawn, a1 white rook, b1 white knight, c1 white bishop, d1 white queen, e1 white king, h1 white rook

1.e4 e5 2.Nf3 d6 3.Bc4 Be7 4.c3
Steinitz Variation
in the Ponziani Opening

Position: a8 black rook, c8 black bishop, d8 black queen, e8 black king, f8 black bishop, h8 black rook, a7 black pawn, b7 black pawn, c7 black pawn, g7 black pawn, h7 black pawn, c6 black knight, f6 black pawn, d5 black pawn, e5 black pawn, a4 white queen, e4 white pawn, c3 white pawn, f3 white knight, a2 white pawn, b2 white pawn, d2 white pawn, f2 white pawn, g2 white pawn, h2 white pawn, a1 white rook, b1 white knight, c1 white bishop, e1 white king, f1 white bishop, h1 white rook

1.e4 e5 2.Nf3 Nc6 3.c3 d5 4.Qa4 f6
Steinitz Variation
in the Queen's Gambit Accepted

Position: a8 black rook, b8 black knight, c8 black bishop, d8 black queen, e8 black king, f8 black bishop, h8 black rook, a7 black pawn, b7 black pawn, f7 black pawn, g7 black pawn, h7 black pawn, e6 black pawn, f6 black knight, c4 white bishop, d4 black pawn, e3 white pawn, f3 white knight, a2 white pawn, b2 white pawn, f2 white pawn, g2 white pawn, h2 white pawn, a1 white rook, b1 white knight, c1 white bishop, d1 white queen, f1 white rook, g1 white king

1.d4 d5 2.c4 dxc4 3.Nf3 Nf6 4.e3 e6 5.Bxc4 c5 6.0-0 cxd4
Steinitz Countergambit
in the Queen's Pawn Game

Position: a8 black rook, b8 black knight, c8 black bishop, d8 black queen, e8 black king, f8 black bishop, g8 black knight, h8 black rook, a7 black pawn, b7 black pawn, e7 black pawn, f7 black pawn, g7 black pawn, h7 black pawn, c5 black pawn, d5 black pawn, d4 white pawn, f4 white bishop, a2 white pawn, b2 white pawn, c2 white pawn, e2 white pawn, f2 white pawn, g2 white pawn, h2 white pawn, a1 white rook, b1 white knight, d1 white queen, e1 white king, f1 white bishop, g1 white knight, h1 white rook

1.d4 d5 2.Bf4 c5
Steinitz Defence
to the Ruy Lopez

Position: a8 black rook, c8 black bishop, d8 black queen, e8 black king, f8 black bishop, g8 black knight, h8 black rook, a7 black pawn, b7 black pawn, c7 black pawn, f7 black pawn, g7 black pawn, h7 black pawn, c6 black knight, d6 black pawn, b5 white bishop, e5 black pawn, e4 white pawn, f3 white knight, a2 white pawn, b2 white pawn, c2 white pawn, d2 white pawn, f2 white pawn, g2 white pawn, h2 white pawn, a1 white rook, b1 white knight, c1 white bishop, d1 white queen, e1 white king, h1 white rook

1.e4 e5 2.Nf3 Nc6 3.Bb5 d6
Steinitz Defence Deferred
to the Ruy Lopez

Position: a8 black rook, c8 black bishop, d8 black queen, e8 black king, f8 black bishop, g8 black knight, h8 black rook, b7 black pawn, c7 black pawn, f7 black pawn, g7 black pawn, h7 black pawn, a6 black pawn, c6 black knight, d6 black pawn, e5 black pawn, a4 white bishop, e4 white pawn, f3 white knight, a2 white pawn, b2 white pawn, c2 white pawn, d2 white pawn, f2 white pawn, g2 white pawn, h2 white pawn, a1 white rook, b1 white knight, c1 white bishop, d1 white queen, e1 white king, h1 white rook

1.e4 e5 2.Nf3 Nc6 3.Bb5 a6 4.Ba4 d6
Steinitz Defence Doubly Deferred
to the Ruy Lopez

Position: a8 black rook, c8 black bishop, d8 black queen, e8 black king, f8 black bishop, h8 black rook, b7 black pawn, c7 black pawn, f7 black pawn, g7 black pawn, h7 black pawn, a6 black pawn, c6 black knight, d6 black pawn, f6 black knight, e5 black pawn, a4 white bishop, e4 white pawn, f3 white knight, a2 white pawn, b2 white pawn, c2 white pawn, d2 white pawn, f2 white pawn, g2 white pawn, h2 white pawn, a1 white rook, b1 white knight, c1 white bishop, d1 white queen, f1 white rook, g1 white king

1.e4 e5 2.Nf3 Nc6 3.Bb5 a6 4.Ba4 Nf6 5.0-0 d6
Steinitz Variation
in the Scotch Game

Position: a8 black rook, c8 black bishop, e8 black king, f8 black bishop, g8 black knight, h8 black rook, a7 black pawn, b7 black pawn, c7 black pawn, d7 black pawn, f7 black pawn, g7 black pawn, h7 black pawn, c6 black knight, d4 white knight, e4 white pawn, h4 black queen, c3 white knight, a2 white pawn, b2 white pawn, c2 white pawn, f2 white pawn, g2 white pawn, h2 white pawn, a1 white rook, c1 white bishop, d1 white queen, e1 white king, f1 white bishop, h1 white rook

1.e4 e5 2.Nf3 Nc6 3.d4 exd4 4.Nxd4 Qh4 5.Nc3
Steinitz Variation
in the Sicilian Defence

Position: a8 black rook, b8 black knight, c8 black bishop, d8 black queen, e8 black king, f8 black bishop, g8 black knight, h8 black rook, a7 black pawn, b7 black pawn, d7 black pawn, e7 black pawn, f7 black pawn, g7 black pawn, h7 black pawn, c5 black pawn, e4 white pawn, g3 white pawn, a2 white pawn, b2 white pawn, c2 white pawn, d2 white pawn, f2 white pawn, h2 white pawn, a1 white rook, b1 white knight, c1 white bishop, d1 white queen, e1 white king, f1 white bishop, g1 white knight, h1 white rook

1.e4 c5 2.g3
Steinitz Variation
in the Three Knights Opening

Position: a8 black rook, c8 black bishop, d8 black queen, e8 black king, f8 black bishop, g8 black knight, h8 black rook, a7 black pawn, b7 black pawn, c7 black pawn, d7 black pawn, f7 black pawn, h7 black pawn, c6 black knight, g6 black pawn, e5 black pawn, e4 white pawn, c3 white knight, f3 white knight, a2 white pawn, b2 white pawn, c2 white pawn, d2 white pawn, f2 white pawn, g2 white pawn, h2 white pawn, a1 white rook, c1 white bishop, d1 white queen, e1 white king, f1 white bishop, h1 white rook

1.e4 e5 2.Nf3 Nc6 3.Nc3 g6
Steinitz Variation
in the Two Knights Defense

Position: a8 black rook, c8 black bishop, d8 black queen, e8 black king, f8 black bishop, h8 black rook, a7 black pawn, f7 black pawn, g7 black pawn, c6 black pawn, f6 black knight, h6 black pawn, a5 black knight, e5 black pawn, h3 white knight, a2 white pawn, b2 white pawn, c2 white pawn, d2 white pawn, e2 white bishop, f2 white pawn, g2 white pawn, h2 white pawn, a1 white rook, b1 white knight, c1 white bishop, d1 white queen, e1 white king, h1 white rook

1.e4 e5 2.Nf3 Nc6 3.Bc4 Nf6 4.Ng5 d5 5.exd5 Na5 6.Bb5+ c6 7.dxc6 bxc6 8.Be2 h6 9.Nh3
Steinitz Variation
in the Vienna Game

Position: a8 black rook, b8 black knight, c8 black bishop, d8 black queen, e8 black king, f8 black bishop, h8 black rook, a7 black pawn, b7 black pawn, c7 black pawn, f7 black pawn, g7 black pawn, h7 black pawn, f6 black knight, d5 black pawn, e5 black pawn, e4 white pawn, f4 white pawn, c3 white knight, d3 white pawn, a2 white pawn, b2 white pawn, c2 white pawn, g2 white pawn, h2 white pawn, a1 white rook, c1 white bishop, d1 white queen, e1 white king, f1 white bishop, g1 white knight, h1 white rook

1.e4 e5 2.Nc3 Nf6 3.f4 d5 4.d3
Steinitz Gambit
in the Vienna Game

Position: a8 black rook, c8 black bishop, d8 black queen, e8 black king, f8 black bishop, g8 black knight, h8 black rook, a7 black pawn, b7 black pawn, c7 black pawn, d7 black pawn, f7 black pawn, g7 black pawn, h7 black pawn, c6 black knight, d4 white pawn, e4 white pawn, f4 black pawn, c3 white knight, a2 white pawn, b2 white pawn, c2 white pawn, g2 white pawn, h2 white pawn, a1 white rook, c1 white bishop, d1 white queen, e1 white king, f1 white bishop, g1 white knight, h1 white rook

1.e4 e5 2.Nc3 Nc6 3.f4 exf4 4.d4
