= Samuel Boden =

English chess player

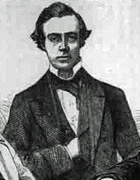
Samuel Boden

Samuel Standidge Boden (born 4 May 1826 in East Retford, Nottinghamshire; d. 13 January 1882 in Bedford Square, London) was an English professional chess master.

The mating pattern "Boden's Mate" was named after the mate that occurred in one of his games, Schulder–Boden, London 1853. However, the mate was known previously from the game Horwitz–Popert, Hamburg 1844. There is also a line in the Philidor Defence named after him, based on one of his games against Paul Morphy.

Morphy was of the opinion that Boden was the strongest English master, even though Barnes had a better record against him than Boden.

He was the author of A Popular Introduction to the Study and Practice of Chess, published anonymously in 1851.
