= Paul Morphy =

American chess player (1837–1884)

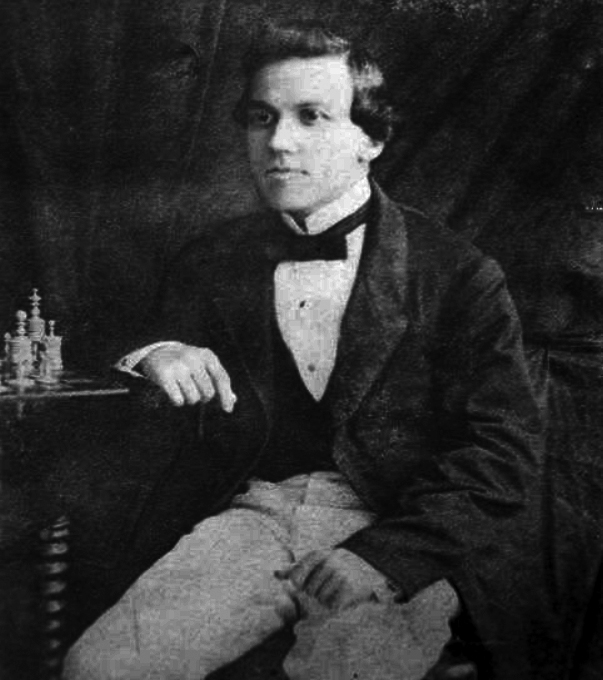
- Morphy in Philadelphia, 1859

Personal information
- Born: June 22, 1837 New Orleans, Louisiana, U.S.
- Died: July 10, 1884 (aged 47) New Orleans, Louisiana, U.S.

Chess career
- Country: United States
- Years active: 1857–1859

Paul Charles Morphy (June 22, 1837 – July 10, 1884) was an American chess player. During his brief career in the late 1850s, Morphy was acknowledged as the world's greatest chess master. Later commentators have concluded that he was far ahead of his time.

A prodigy, Morphy emerged onto the chess scene in 1857 by convincingly winning the First American Chess Congress, winning each match by a large margin. He then traveled to Europe, residing for a time in England and France while challenging the continent's top players. He played matches with most of the leading English and French players, as well as the German Adolf Anderssen—again winning all matches by large margins. In 1859, Morphy returned to the United States, before ultimately abandoning competitive chess and receding from public view.

== Biography ==
=== Early life ===
Morphy was born in New Orleans to a prominent wealthy family. His father Alonzo Morphy, of Spanish and Irish ancestry, was a lawyer. He later served as a Louisiana state legislator, Attorney General, and a Louisiana State Supreme Court Justice. Morphy's mother, Louise Thérèse Felicitie Thelcide Le Carpentier, was a musically talented woman from a prominent French Creole family. Paul grew up in an atmosphere of cultivated, genteel civility, where chess and music were the typical highlights of a Sunday home gathering.

Sources differ about when and how Morphy learned to play chess. According to his uncle, Ernest Morphy, no one formally taught the young Morphy how to play chess; rather, he simply learned by watching others play. After observing Ernest and Alonzo abandon what had been a lengthy game, conceding that it was a draw—Paul spoke up, stating that Ernest should have won. This surprised the two men, who had not realized that Paul knew the rules of the game, let alone any notion of strategy. They were even more surprised when Paul proved his claim by resetting the pieces and demonstrating the win his uncle had missed. Biographer Frederick Milnes Edge dismisses this anecdote as apocryphal, however. In 1845, Ernest acted as the second for Eugène Rousseau in his match against Charles H. Stanley, and took the young Paul along with him.

=== Childhood victories ===
By 1846, the nine-year-old Morphy was considered one of the best players in New Orleans. That year, General Winfield Scott visited the city while on his way to the war with Mexico. He informed his hosts that he wanted to spend an evening playing chess against a strong local opponent. While he only played infrequently, Scott enjoyed chess and considered himself to be a formidable player. The arrangements were made, and a game was set up after dinner. When Morphy was brought in, Scott initially took offense to a child being offered as his opponent, believing he was being made fun of. However, after being assured that his wishes had been scrupulously obeyed, and that Morphy was a chess prodigy who would prove his skill, Scott agreed to play. Morphy easily defeated Scott in both of the games they played, ending the second game by announcing a forced checkmate after only six moves.

During 1848 and 1849, Morphy competed against the leading players in New Orleans. He played at least fifty games against Eugène Rousseau, considered to be the strongest of Morphy's opponents during this era, and lost at most five. In 1850, Hungarian chess master Johann Löwenthal visited New Orleans. Löwenthal, a refugee of the Hungarian revolution of 1848, had visited various American cities and competed successfully against the best local players. He accepted an invitation to Judge Morphy's house to play against Paul, now twelve years old. Löwenthal soon realized he was facing a formidable opponent: each time Morphy made a good move, Löwenthal's eyebrows shot up in a manner described by Ernest Morphy as "comique". Löwenthal played three games against Morphy during his stay in New Orleans, with sources recording him as either having two losses and one draw, or as losing all three games. (Note: One of the games was given as a draw in Sergeant's Morphy's Games of Chess (1957), taken from Löwenthal's collection of Morphy's games (1860), but Lawson (1976) considers that the correct score was that published by other sources, such as the New York Clipper, in 1856, as submitted for publication by Ernest Morphy.)

=== Schooling and the First American Chess Congress ===
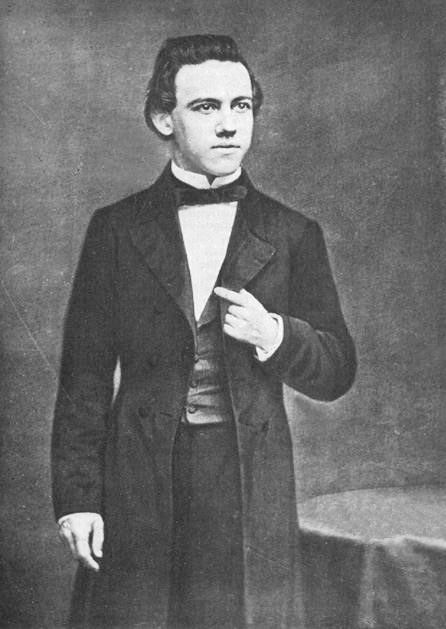
Morphy in 1857, studio of Mathew Brady

Beginning in 1850, Morphy played relatively little chess for a number of years, instead focusing on his education. Diligent in his studies, he received a bachelor's degree in 1854 from Spring Hill College in Mobile, Alabama, with his graduating thesis detailing what he saw as the narrow logical limits on justifications for war and secession by the southern states. He proceeded to spend an additional year on campus studying mathematics and philosophy, and in May 1855 was awarded a master's degree with the highest honors.

Morphy went on to study law at the University of Louisiana (now Tulane University), receiving an LL.B. degree on April 7, 1857. It has been claimed that Morphy memorized the complete Louisiana Civil Code during the course of his studies. Morphy's father had died suddenly, in November of 1856.

Not yet the required age to practice law, Morphy found himself with free time after graduation. That year, he received an invitation to participate in the First American Chess Congress, to be held from October 6 to November 10, 1857, in New York. Morphy initially declined, but later changed his mind at the urging of Alexander Beaufort Meek, a judge and close family friend. The main event of the Congress was a 16-man knockout tournament, with each round consisting of short multi-game matches contested by the opponents. Also competing was the strong German chess master Louis Paulsen, who was already aware of Morphy's talent, and said openly beforehand that he would be the tournament's victor. Moreover, while the competition was underway Paulsen repeatedly stated that if Morphy were to visit Europe, he could prove his status as the game's greatest living player. As predicted by Paulsen, Morphy defeated James Thompson in the first round, his family friend Meek in the quarter-finals, the German master Theodor Lichtenhein in the semifinals, and ultimately Paulsen himself in the finals, to win the tournament's grand prize.

After his victory, Morphy was immediately hailed as the chess champion of the United States, but he appeared to be unaffected by his sudden fame. According to the December 1857 issue of Chess Monthly, "his genial disposition, his unaffected modesty and gentlemanly courtesy have endeared him to all his acquaintances." While staying in New York during the fall of 1857, Morphy played 261 games, both with and without odds. In regular games, Morphy's overall record was 87 wins, 8 draws, and 5 losses.

Also in 1857, Morphy founded the Chess Club of New Orleans, becoming its first President. Early in the following year, he was recruited by Daniel Fiske to serve as co-editor of his Chess Monthly publication, a position he held until the end of 1860.

=== Europe ===
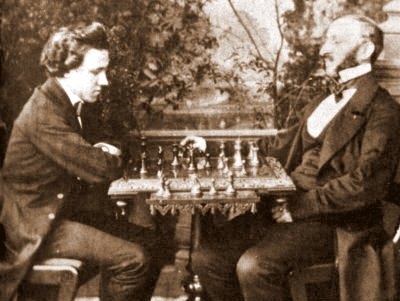
Morphy vs. Löwenthal, 1858

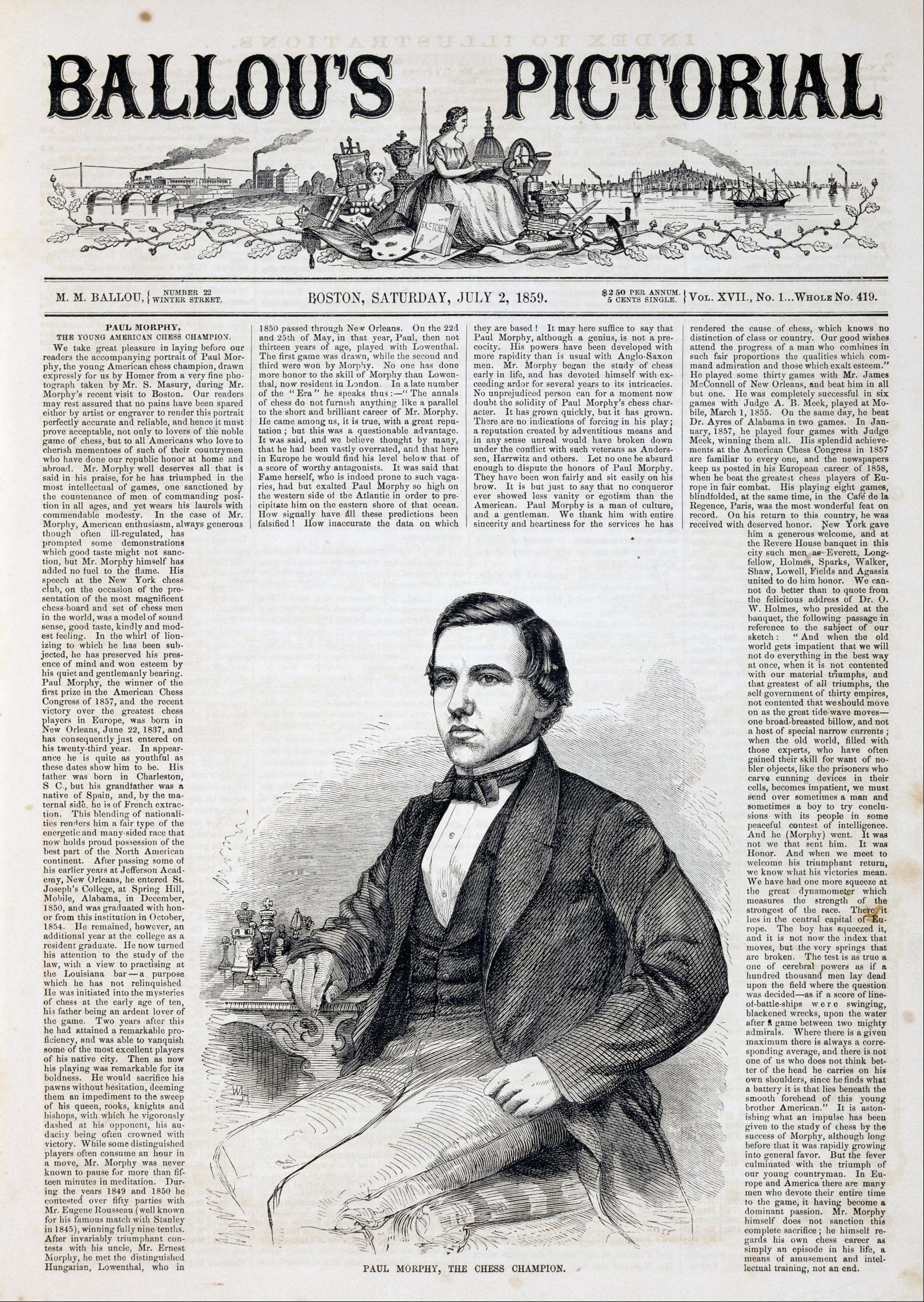
Engraving of Paul Morphy by Winslow Homer appearing in Ballou's Pictorial (1859)

Up to this time, Morphy was not well known or highly regarded in Europe. Despite his dominance of the American chess scene, the quality of his opponents was relatively low compared to Europe, where most of the best chess players lived. European opinion was that they should not have to make the journey to the United States to play a young and relatively unknown player, especially as the United States had few other quality players to make such a trip worthwhile.

The American Chess Association, it is reported, are about to challenge any player in Europe to contest a match with the young victor in the late passage at arms, for from $2,000 to $5,000 a side, the place of meeting being New York. If the battle-ground were to be London or Paris, there can be little doubt, we apprehend, that a European champion would be found; but the best players in Europe are not chess professionals, but have other and more serious avocations, the interests of which forbid such an expenditure of time as is required for a voyage to the United States and back again.

— The Illustrated London News, December 26, 1857

Morphy returned to his home city with no further action. The New Orleans Chess Club determined that a direct challenge should be made to European champion Howard Staunton.

Sir,—On behalf of the New Orleans Chess Club, and in compliance with the instructions of that body, we the undersigned committee, have the honor to invite you to visit our city, and there meet Mr. Paul Morphy in a chess match ...

... it was suggested that Mr. Morphy, the winner at the late Congress and the present American champion, should cross the ocean, and boldly encounter the distinguished magnates of the transatlantic chess circles; but it unfortunately happens that serious family reasons forbid Mr. Morphy, for the present, to entertain the thought of visiting Europe. It, therefore, becomes necessary to arrange, if possible, a meeting between the latter and the acknowledged European champion, in regard to whom there can be no scope for choice or hesitation—the common voice of the chess world pronounces your name ...

— New Orleans Chess Club to Howard Staunton, February 4, 1858

Staunton made an official reply through The Illustrated London News, stating that it was not possible for him to travel to the United States and that Morphy must come to Europe if he wished to challenge him and other European chess players.

... The terms of this cartel are distinguished by extreme courtesy, and with one notable exception, by extreme liberality also. The exception in question, however (we refer to the clause which stipulates that the combat shall take place in New Orleans!) appears to us utterly fatal to the match ...

... If Mr. Morphy—for whose skill we entertain the liveliest admiration—be desirous to win his spurs among the chess chivalry of Europe, he must take advantage of his purposed visit next year; he will then meet in this country, in France, in Germany, and in Russia, many champions whose names must be as household words to him, ready to test and do honor to his prowess.

— The Illustrated London News, April 3, 1858

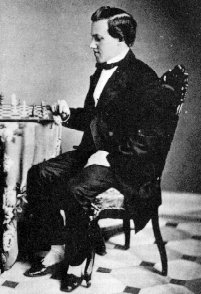
Morphy in 1859

Eventually, Morphy went to Europe to play Staunton and other chess greats. Morphy made numerous attempts at setting up a match with Staunton, but none ever came through. Staunton was later criticized for avoiding a match with Morphy, although his peak as a player had been in the 1840s and he was considered past his prime by the late 1850s. Staunton is known to have been working on his edition of the complete works of Shakespeare at the time, but he also competed in a chess tournament during Morphy's visit. Staunton later blamed Morphy for the failure to have a match, suggesting among other things that Morphy lacked the funds required for match stakes—a most unlikely charge given Morphy's popularity. Morphy also remained resolutely opposed to playing chess for money, reportedly due to family pressure.

Seeking new opponents, Morphy crossed the English Channel to France. At Paris's Café de la Régence, the center of French chess, Morphy soundly defeated resident chess professional Daniel Harrwitz. While there, he also defeated eight opponents in blindfolded simultaneous exhibitions.

In Paris, Morphy suffered from a bout of gastroenteritis. In accordance with the medical wisdom of the time, he was treated with leeches, resulting in his losing a significant amount of blood. Although too weak to stand up unaided, Morphy insisted on going ahead with a match against the visiting German master Adolf Anderssen, considered by many to be Europe's leading player. The match between Morphy and Anderssen took place between December 20, 1858, and December 28, 1858, when Morphy was still only 21 years of age. Despite his illness Morphy triumphed easily, winning seven while losing two, with two draws. When asked about his defeat, Anderssen claimed to be out of practice, but also admitted that Morphy was in any event the stronger player and that he was fairly beaten. Anderssen also attested that in his opinion, Morphy was the strongest player ever to play the game, even stronger than the famous French champion La Bourdonnais.

Morphy gave numerous simultaneous exhibitions in both England and France, sometimes while blindfolded, in which he regularly played and defeated eight opponents at a time.

=== Hailed as champion ===
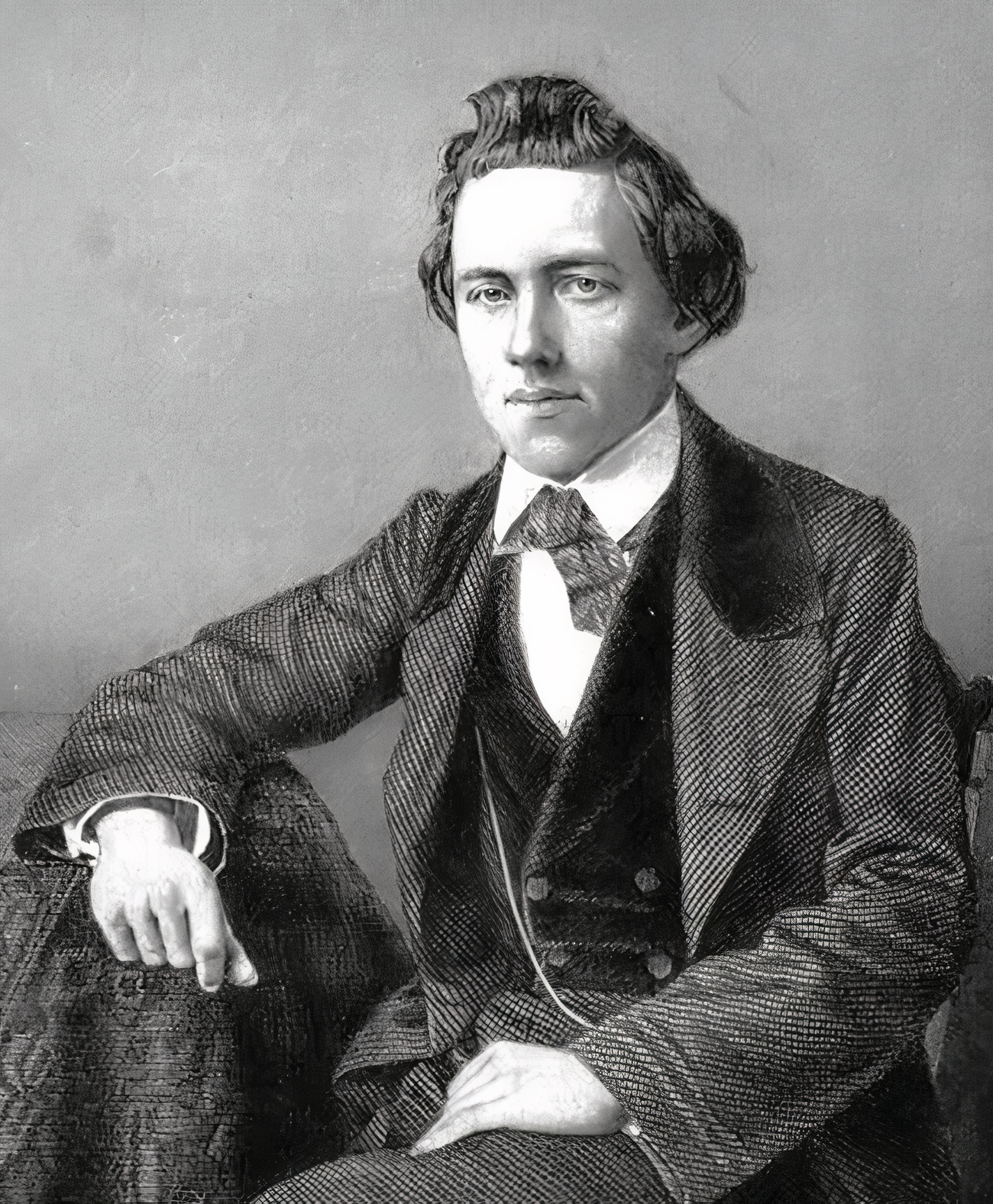
1859 engraving of Morphy, by Daniel Pound

Still only 21 years old, Morphy was now quite famous. While in Paris, he was sitting in his hotel room one evening, chatting with his companion Frederick Edge, when they had an unexpected visitor. "I am Prince Galitzin; I wish to see Mr. Morphy", the visitor said, according to Edge. Morphy identified himself to the visitor. "No, it is not possible!" the prince exclaimed, "You are too young!" Prince Galitzin then explained that he was in the frontiers of Siberia when he had first heard of Morphy's "wonderful deeds". He explained, "One of my suite had a copy of the chess paper published in Berlin, the Schachzeitung, and ever since that time I have been wanting to see you." He then told Morphy that he must go to Saint Petersburg, Russia, because the chess club in the Imperial Palace would receive him with enthusiasm.

Morphy offered to play a match with Harrwitz, giving odds of pawn and move, and even offered to find stakes to back his opponent, but the offer was declined. Morphy then declared that he would play no more formal matches, with anyone, without giving at least those odds.

In Europe, Morphy was generally hailed as world chess champion. In Paris, at a banquet held in his honor on April 4, 1859, a laurel wreath was placed over the head of a bust of Morphy, carved by the sculptor Eugène-Louis Lequesne. Morphy was declared by St. Amant "the first Chess player in the whole world". At a similar gathering in London, where he returned in the spring of 1859, Morphy was again proclaimed "the Champion of the Chess World". He may also have been invited to a private audience with Queen Victoria. At a simultaneous match against five masters, Morphy won two games against Jules Arnous de Rivière and Henry Edward Bird, drew two games with Samuel Boden and Johann Jacob Löwenthal, and lost one to Thomas Wilson Barnes.

Upon his return to America, the accolades continued as Morphy toured the major cities on his way home. At the University of the City of New York, on May 29, 1859, John Van Buren, son of President Martin Van Buren, ended a testimonial presentation by proclaiming, "Paul Morphy, Chess Champion of the World". In Boston, at a banquet attended by Henry Wadsworth Longfellow, Louis Agassiz, Boston mayor Frederic W. Lincoln Jr., and Harvard president James Walker, Dr. Oliver Wendell Holmes toasted "Paul Morphy, the world's Chess Champion". Consumer products including the "Morphy Hat" and the "Morphy Cigar" were named for him, as was the Morphy Baseball Club in Brooklyn.

At the New York testimonial dinner, Morphy made an assessment of chess that has been widely paraphrased:

Chess never has been and never can be aught but a recreation. It should not be indulged in to the detriment of other and more serious avocations—should not absorb the mind or engross the thoughts of those who worship at its shrine; but should be kept in the background and restrained within its proper province.

Nowadays this may seem ironic or even paradoxical in light of Morphy's dedication to chess. But at the time, Morphy's remarks did not cause surprise.

Morphy was engaged to write a series of chess columns for the New York Ledger, which started in August 1859. They consisted primarily of annotating games of the La Bourdonnais – McDonnell chess matches of 25 years before, plus a few of Morphy's own games. The column ended in August 1860.

=== Retirement from chess and later life ===
After returning home in 1859, Morphy intended to start a career in law. He did not immediately cease playing serious chess; on a visit to Cuba in 1864, he played a number of games with leading players of that country, including Celso Golmayo Zúpide, the champion, all at odds of a knight. For the rest of his life, Morphy would not compete in another tournament or serious match without odds, a stipulation he would stress repeatedly.

Morphy was late to start his law career, not having done so by the time the American Civil War broke out in 1861. His brother Edward had joined the army of the Confederacy at the very beginning of the war, while his mother and sisters had taken up residence in Paris. Not much is known about Morphy's Civil War service; David Lawson cites contemporary reports that Morphy had briefly been on the staff of Pierre Beauregard, as well as being seen at the First Battle of Manassas. Lawson also recounts a recollection by a Richmond resident in 1861 describing Morphy as being "an officer on Beauregard's staff". Other sources indicate that Beauregard considered Morphy to be unqualified, but that he had indeed applied for a staff position. During the war, he spent time both in New Orleans and abroad, spending time in Havana (1862, 1864) and Paris (1863).

After the war, Morphy remained unable to build a successful law practice. According to records, Morphy attempted at least three times to open and advertise a law office, with each endeavor ultimately being abandoned. It has been speculated that his celebrity as a chess player worked against him, overshadowing his attempted practice. Financially secure thanks to his family's fortune, Morphy essentially spent the rest of his life in idleness. When asked by admirers to return to chess competition, he refused. In 1883, Morphy encountered Wilhelm Steinitz on the street while Steinitz was visiting New Orleans, but declined to discuss chess with him.

=== Mental illness ===
Morphy showed signs of deteriorating mental health in his final years. By 1875, his mother, brother and a friend tried to admit him to a Catholic sanitarium, but Morphy was so well able to argue for his rights and sanity that they sent him away. Morphy had shown signs of a persecution complex; he sued his brother-in-law, for example, and tried to provoke a duel with a friend. Hertan notes that it is not easy to determine just when this behavior began, or what might have triggered it, but gives as an example some incidents described in a letter by Charles J. Woodbury to The Hartford Times in 1873. By 1879, according to a letter to the Cincinnati Commercial from a Dr. L. P. Merideth, Morphy was talking to himself and responding to imaginary salutations.

Ernest Jones published an article of psychoanalytic discussion of Morphy. Reuben Fine published a longer article in which Morphy was mentioned. Both articles have been criticized for the use of unreliable historical sources.

Fine wrote that Morphy "arranged women's shoes into a semi-circle around his bed", and this has been widely copied and embellished upon. But it is a misquotation from a booklet written by Morphy's niece, Regina Morphy-Voitier. She wrote:

Now we come to the room which Paul Morphy occupied, and which was separated from his mother's by a narrow hall. Morphy's room was always kept in perfect order, for he was very particular and neat, yet this room had a peculiar aspect and at once struck the visitor as such, for Morphy had a dozen or more pairs of shoes of all kinds which he insisted in keeping arranged in a semi-circle in the middle of the room, explaining with his sarcastic smile that in this way, he could at once lay his hands on the particular pair he desired to wear. In a huge porte-manteau he kept all his clothes which were at all times neatly pressed and creased.

Fine incorrectly claimed that the shoes described were women's shoes instead of Morphy's own. But in any case, Hertan dismisses the psychoanalytical studies:

While Freudian Psychoanalysis still has many adherents, no credible Psychotherapist today ascribes a Major Mental Illness to internal conflicts; the biochemical basis of Psychotic Disorders is too well understood.

=== Death ===
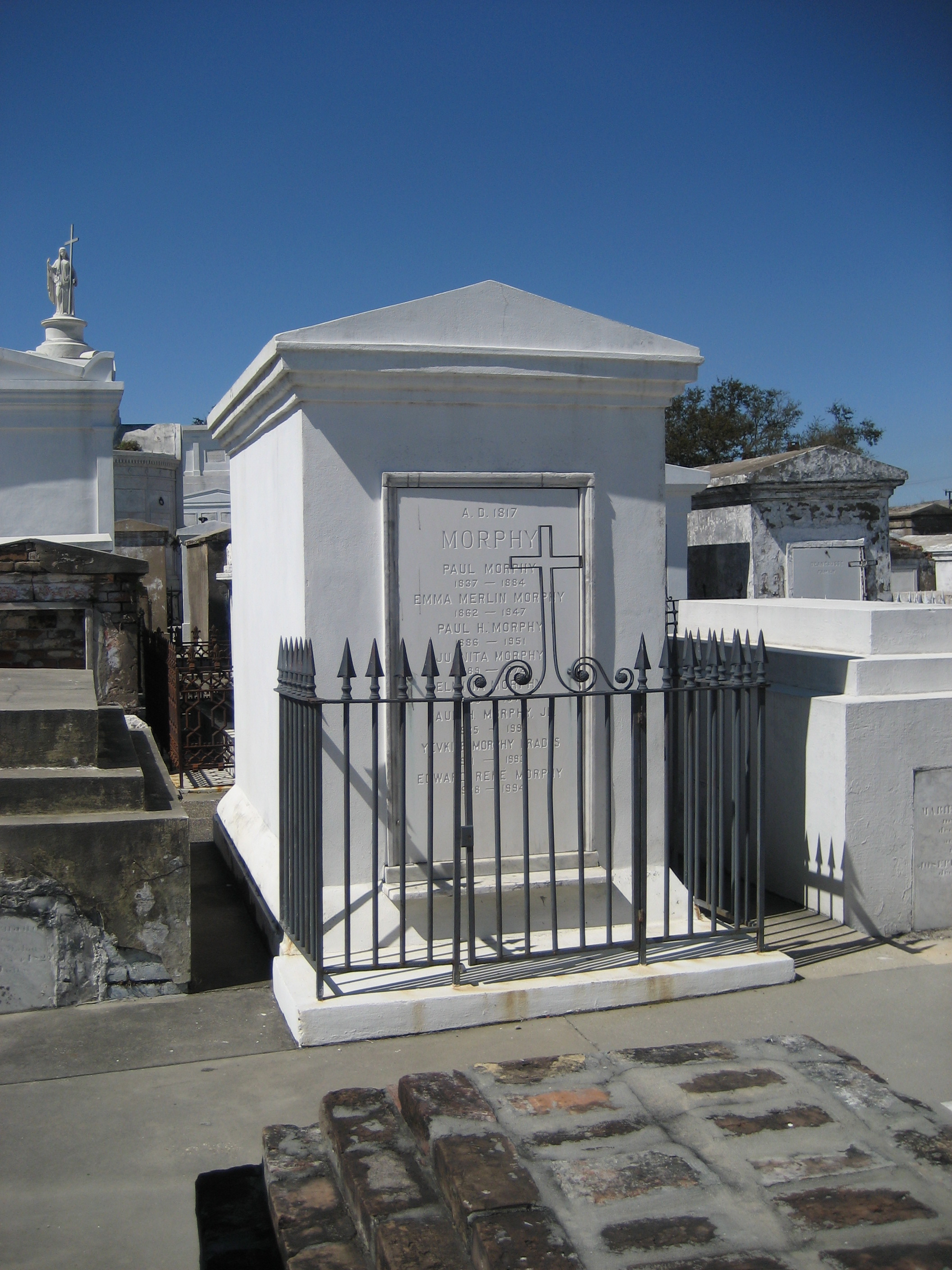
Morphy's crypt in Saint Louis Cemetery No. 1

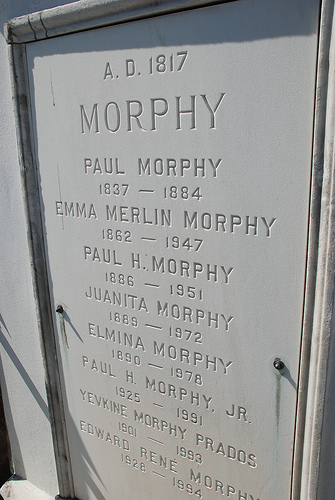
Morphy's gravestone

On the afternoon of July 10, 1884, Morphy was found dead in his bathtub in New Orleans at the age of 47. The cause of death was described as congestion of the brain brought on by entering cold water after a long walk in the midday heat. (Note: Congestion of the brain is no longer used as a diagnosis; Morphy may have suffered a stroke.) A lifelong Catholic, Morphy was buried in the family tomb in Saint Louis Cemetery No. 1, New Orleans, Louisiana. The mansion was sold by the family in 1891, and later became the site of the restaurant Brennan's.

== Style of play ==
With the White pieces, Morphy opted for 1.e4 except in a few games played at odds. He favored gambits such as the King's Gambit and Evans Gambit. With the Black pieces, Morphy usually answered 1.e4 with 1...e5. In the Spanish Game, the Morphy Defense (1.e4 e5 2.Nf3 Nc6 3.Bb5 a6), the most popular response for Black, is named for him. When playing against 1.d4 as Black, he favored the Dutch Defense (1...f5), but also tried the Queen's Gambit Declined. In his notes to the games of the La Bourdonnais – McDonnell chess matches he criticized the Sicilian Defense (1.e4 c5) and Queen's Gambit (1.d4 d5 2.c4); the only recorded instance of Morphy playing the Sicilian Defense as Black was during a game against Löwenthal in 1858. According to Garry Kasparov,

[Morphy] became the most erudite player of his time. Fluent in French, English, Spanish, and German, he read Philidor's L'analyse, the Parisian magazine La Régence, Staunton's Chess Player's Chronicle, and possibly also Anderssen's Schachzeitung (at least, he knew all of Anderssen's published games). He studied Bilguer's 400-page Handbuch—which consisted partly of opening analyses in tabular form, and also Staunton's Chess Player's Handbook.

Morphy approached the game more seriously than even his strongest contemporaries. As Anderssen noted,

I cannot describe better the impression that Morphy made on me than by saying that he treats chess with the earnestness and conscientiousness of an artist. With us, the exertion that a game requires is only a matter of distraction, and lasts only as long as the game gives us pleasure; with him, it is a sacred duty. Never is a game of chess a mere pastime for him, but always a problem worthy of his steel, always a work of vocation, always as if an act by which he fulfills part of his mission.

While Morphy generally played quickly, he "knew also how to be slow, as in some of his match-games with Anderssen". Morphy played before the advent of time controls, and sometimes faced opponents who played very slowly. During the second game of their match in the First American Chess Congress finals, Paulsen required eleven hours for his moves.

Löwenthal and Anderssen both later remarked that Morphy was very hard to beat, since he knew how to defend well and would draw or even win games despite getting into bad positions. At the same time, he was deadly when given a promising position. Anderssen especially commented on this, saying that, after one bad move against Morphy, one might as well resign. Explaining his poor record facing Morphy, Anderssen said "[Morphy] wins his games in Seventeen moves, and I in Seventy. But that is only natural".

== Legacy ==
Garry Kasparov posited that Morphy's historical merit lay in his realizing the relevance of three principles that would be vital in later analysis of the game: rapid development, domination of the center, and creation of open files. These principles were only formulated in the theoretical work of Wilhelm Steinitz a quarter-century later. Kasparov maintained that Morphy can be considered both the "forefather of modern chess" and "the first swallow – the prototype of the strong 20th-century grandmaster". World champions Kasparov, Viswanathan Anand, and Max Euwe have stated that Morphy's play was far ahead of its time. Euwe moreover described Morphy as "a chess genius in the most complete sense of the term".

Bobby Fischer ranked Morphy among the ten greatest chess players of all time, and described him as "perhaps the most accurate player who ever lived". He noted that "Morphy [...] had enormous talent", and stated that he had the talent to defeat top players of any era. Reuben Fine disagreed with Fischer's assessment: "[Morphy's] glorifiers went on to urge that he was the most brilliant genius who had ever appeared. [...] But if we examine Morphy's record and games critically, we cannot justify such extravaganza. And we are compelled to speak of it as the Morphy myth. [...] He was so far ahead of his rivals that it is hard to find really outstanding examples of his skill... Even if the myth has been destroyed, Morphy remains one of the giants of chess history."

Due to his early exit from the game despite his unprecedented talent, Morphy has been called "The Pride and Sorrow of Chess". This epithet has often been credited to Sheriff Walter Cook Spens, chess editor of the Glasgow Weekly Herald, but it is unclear when it first appeared in print.

A heavily fictionalized account of Morphy's life is presented in Frances Parkinson Keyes' 1960 novel The Chess Players: A Novel of New Orleans and Paris. Morphy is mentioned in Walter Tevis's 1983 novel The Queen's Gambit, as well as in the 2020 miniseries adaptation produced by Netflix, as the favorite player of Beth Harmon, a chess prodigy and the novel's protagonist. Fritz Leiber's 1974 short story "Midnight by the Morphy Watch" centers on the supernatural properties imbued within a pocket watch once owned by Morphy.

== Results ==
Games at odds, blindfold games, and consultation games are not listed.

Selected head-to-head records prior to the First American Chess Congress
Date	Opponent	W	L	D	Location
1849–1850	Eugène Rousseau (Note: Figures are estimated.)	45	5	0	New Orleans
1849–1852	James McConnell	29	1	0	New Orleans
1850	Johann Löwenthal	2	0	1	New Orleans
1855	Alexander Beaufort Meek	6	0	0	Mobile, Alabama
1855	T. Ayers	2	0	0	Mobile, Alabama
1857	Alexander Beaufort Meek	4	0	0	Mobile, Alabama

Results from the First American Chess Congress (1857)
	Opponent	W	L	D
First round	James Thompson	3	0	0
Quarter-final	Alexander Beaufort Meek	3	0	0
Semi-final	Theodor Lichtenhein	3	0	1
Final	Louis Paulsen	5	1	2

Games played at the First American Chess Congress outside the main tournament
Opponent	W	L	D
Samuel Robert Calthrop	1	0	0
Lewis Elkin	1	0	0
Daniel Willard Fiske	3	0	0
William James Appleton Fuller	2	0	0
George Hammond	7	1	0
Hiram Kennicott	1	0	0
Theodor Lichtenhein	1	0	2
Napoleon Marache	3	0	0
Charles Mead	1	0	0
Alexander Beaufort Meek	2	0	0
Hardman Montgomery	1	0	0
David Parry	1	0	0
Louis Paulsen	3	0	1
Frederick Perrin	1	0	2
Benjamin Raphael	1	0	0
John William Schulten	23	1	0
Moses Solomons	2	0	0
Charles Henry Stanley	12	1	0
James Thompson	5	0	0

Games played in England (1858)
Opponent	W	L	D
Edward Löwe	6	0	0
Thomas Hampton	2	0	0
Thomas Barnes	19	7	0
Samuel Boden	6	1	3
James Kipping	2	0	0
George Webb Medley	3	0	0
Augustus Mongredien	2	0	0
John Owen	4	1	0
Johann Löwenthal (Note: Match.)	9	3	2
Henry Edward Bird	10	1	1

Games played in France (1858–1859)
Opponent	W	L	D
Daniel Harrwitz	5	2	1
Paul Journoud	12	0	0
Henri Baucher	2	0	0
Wincenty Budzyński	7	0	0
Jean Adolphe Laroche	5	0	2
Jules Arnous de Rivière	6	1	1
Adolf Anderssen	7	2	2
Adolf Anderssen	5	1	0
Augustus Mongredien	7	0	1
Franz Schrüfer	1	0	0

Games played after return to the United States
Date	Opponent	W	L	D	Location
1859	Johann Löwenthal	1	1	1	(United Kingdom) London
1862	Félix Sicre	1	0	0	(Spanish Empire) Havana
1863	Jules Arnous de Rivière	13	5	0	(France) Paris

== Notable games ==
=== Louis Paulsen vs. Morphy, First American Chess Congress final (1857) ===
Morphy defeats his main rival in the First American Chess Congress. Notes are excerpted from those by Kasparov.

1. e4 e5 2. Nf3 Nc6 3. Nc3 Nf6 4. Bb5 Bc5 5. 0-0 0-0 Morphy sacrifices a pawn. 6. Nxe5 Re8 7. Nxc6?! 7.Nf3! gives an advantage. 7... dxc6 8. Bc4 b5 But not immediately 8...Nxe4? in view of 9.Nxe4 Rxe4 10.Bxf7+ Kxf7 11.Qf3+ 9. Be2 Nxe4 10. Nxe4 Rxe4 11. Bf3 Re6 12. c3? A simply hideous move: who would think of allowing the queen in at d3? Especially since 12.d3 retains a normal position. 12... Qd3! 13. b4 Bb6 14. a4 bxa4 15. Qxa4 Bd7? Black could have played 15...Bb7! maintaining control of a6. 16. Ra2? The queen should have been dislodged from d3 by 16.Qa6!. 16... Rae8 With the threat of ...Qxf1+. 17. Qa6 Qxf3!! 18. gxf3 Rg6+ 19. Kh1 Bh3 20. Rd1 20.Rg1? Rxg1+ 21.Kxg1 Re1+ 20... Bg2+ 21. Kg1 Bxf3+ 22. Kf1 Bg2+ The 'quiet' 22...Rg2! would have won more quickly: 23.Qd3 Rxf2+ 24.Kg1 Rg2+ 25.Kh1 Rg1 mate (Zukertort). 23. Kg1 Bh3+ Black could have mated by 23...Be4+ 24.Kf1 Bf5! 25.Qe2 Bh3+ 26.Ke1 Rg1 (Bauer). 24. Kh1 Bxf2 25. Qf1 Bxf1 26. Rxf1 Re2 27. Ra1 Rh6 28. d4 Be3 0–1 White resigned.

=== The Opera Game: Morphy vs. Duke of Brunswick and Count Isouard (1858) ===
During Morphy's stay in Paris, he played a casual game at the Italian Opera House against the Duke of Brunswick and Count Isouard. While Morphy's opponents were not the strongest, this later became a well-known game due to its beauty and instructive value, often used by chess teachers to demonstrate how to use tempo, develop pieces, and generate threats.

=== Morphy vs. Adolf Anderssen, game 9 (1858) ===
In the ninth game of their match, Morphy launches a sacrificial attack against Anderssen's Sicilian defense, winning in 17 moves. Notes are excerpted from those by Kasparov.

1. e4 c5 2. d4 cxd4 3. Nf3 Nc6 4. Nxd4 e6 5. Nb5 d6 It is hard to believe that this modern tabiya occurred a century and a half ago! 6. Bf4 Fischer's favourite, but later everyone began preferring Karpov's favourite move 6.c4. 6... e5 7. Be3 f5? More than a hundred years were required, in order to show that after 7...Nf6 8.Bg5 Be6 Black has nothing to worry about, for example: 9.N1c3 a6 10.Bxf6 gxf6 11.Na3 d5! etc. (Fischer–Petrosian, Buenos Aires 1st match-game 1971). However, Anderssen with his aggressive style wanted to hasten a crisis in the centre: previously such methods had always worked for him. 8. N1c3! Morphy sensed that chess logic was on his side, and he found an immediate refutation of Black's premature activity. 8... f4 If 8...a6, then 9.Nd5! axb5 10.Bb6 Qh4 11.Nc7+ Kd7 12.Nxa8 Qxe4+ 13.Qe2 is decisive. 9. Nd5! fxe3 10. Nbc7+ Kf7 11. Qf3+ 11.Nxa8 was probably stronger, but Morphy did not want to divert his sights from the enemy king. 11... Nf6 12. Bc4 Nd4! 13. Nxf6+ d5! 14. Bxd5+ Kg6? White would have been caused more problems by Zukertort's suggestion of 14...Ke7. 15. Qh5+ Kxf6 16. fxe3! Nxc2+ This loses immediately, but 16...Qxc7 would merely have prolonged the agony: 17.Rf1+ (much clearer than Maróczy's suggestion of 17.exd4 Ke7 18.0-0-0) 17...Nf5 18.Rxf5+! Bxf5 19.Qxf5+ Ke7 20.Qe6+ Kd8 21.0-0-0! Bd6 22.Bxb7 etc. 17. Ke2 1–0 Black resigned in view of the continuation 17...Nxa1 18.Rf1+ Ke7 19.Qxe5+ Kd7 20.Be6+ Kc6 21.Rc1+ Kb6 22.Qb5 mate.

== See also ==
- List of chess games
- Morphy number – connections of chess players to Morphy

== Notes ==
Awards and achievements
Preceded by Charles Stanley	United States Chess Champion; 1857–1871	Succeeded by George H. Mackenzie
