= Augustus Mongredien =

English merchant, writer and chess master

- Augustus Mongredien (right) with George Walker (center) and William Lewis (left).
- Born: 1807; London, England
- Died: 30 March 1888 (aged 80–81); London, England
- Occupation: corn merchant
- Known for: Chess master

Augustus Mongredien (1807–1888) was a corn merchant, also known as a political economist and writer. He was a leading amateur British chess master.

== Life ==
He was born in London in 1807, of French parents. His father was a French officer who fled to England after Bonaparte's coup d'état in 1798.

He was educated in the Roman Catholic college at Penn, Buckinghamshire, and continued his studies long after leaving the institution. He entered commercial life at an early age, and was the owner of the first screw steamers to the Levant.

In 1859, he became a member of the firm of H. J. Johnston & Co., and when it was broken up in 1864 he began as a cornbroker on his own account. In 1862, he purchased Heatherside, Surrey.

Gradually he withdrew from business and devoted most of his attention to literary pursuits. He had joined the National Political Union in 1831, as well as a spinoff organization, The Radical Club, in 1833 and in 1872 he was elected a member of the Cobden Club, under the auspices of which society several of his treatises were published.

He thoroughly grasped the free-trade question, and expounded his views on the most difficult problems of political economy with great lucidity. He was a good musician and an excellent botanist. He was elected president of the Chess Club in 1839. He had a colloquial knowledge of seven languages, could recite many pages of the Koran, and spoke modern Greek like a native. Mr. Gladstone, in recognition of his merits, placed his name on the Civil Pension List.

Mongredien died at Forest Hill, London, on 30 March 1888.

== Chess career ==
In 1859 Mongredien played a chess match against Paul Morphy. After drawing the first game, he lost the next seven on the trot, losing the match 7.5-0.5. In 1862 he played in chess's first international round-robin tournament (in which each participant plays every other) in London, finishing 11th of 14 with 3/13.

== Works ==
Mongredien wrote on free trade and botanical subjects. His principal works are :

1. Trees and Shrubs for English Plantations; a selection and description of the most Ornamental Trees and Shrubs, Native and Foreign, which will flourish in the Open Air in our Climate .... with Illustrations, London, 8vo.
2. England's Foreign Policy; an Enquiry as to whether we should continue a Policy of Intervention, London, 8vo.
3. The Heatherside Manual of Hardy Trees and Shrubs, London, 1874-5, 8vo.
4. Frank Allerton. An Autobiography, 3 vols. London, 1878, 8vo.
5. Free Trade and English Commerce, 2nd edit. London [1879], 8vo; answered by F. J. B. Hooper, 1880; and in Half-a-pair of Scissors; or what is our (so-called) Free Trade ? (anon.), Manchester, 1885.
6. The Western Farmer of America, London, 1880, 8vo, reprinted 1886; replied to by T. H. Dudley and J. W. Hinton.
7. History of the Free Trade Movement in England, London, 1881, 8vo, translated into French by H. Gravez, Paris, 1885, 8vo.
8. Pleas for Protection examined, London, 1882, 8vo; reprinted 1888.
9. Wealth-Creation, London, 1882, 8vo.
10. The Suez Canal Question, 1883, 8vo.
11. Trade Depression, recent and present [1885], 8vo.
12. On the Displacement of Labour and Capital, 1886, 8vo.

== Sources ==
- Howe, A. C. "Mongredien, Augustus". Oxford Dictionary of National Biography (online ed.). Oxford University Press. doi:10.1093/ref:odnb/18954. (Subscription, Wikipedia Library access or UK public library membership required.)
