= Charles Johnson Woodbury =

American lecturer and poet (1844–1927)

Charles Johnson Woodbury (September 15, 1844 – May 13, 1927) was American manufacturer, lecturer and poet.

== Biography ==
Woodbury was born on September 15, 1844. A Williams College graduate, he met Ralph Waldo Emerson on November 7, 1865, when he lectured for one day, but stayed for a week because of positive reception from students. Woodbury and Emerson became acquaintances, which Woodbury used their time to write Talks With Ralph Waldo Emerson. He died on May 13, 1927, aged 83, in Oakland, California.
