= Thomas Wilson Barnes =

English chess player

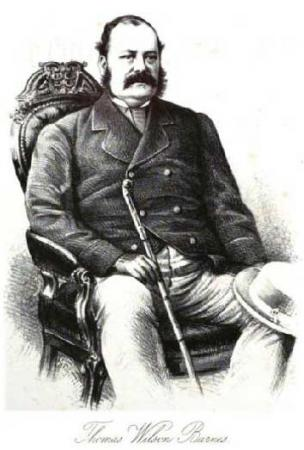
- Thomas Wilson Barnes

Personal information
- Born: 1825
- Died: 20 August 1874 (aged 48–49)

Chess career
- Country: England

Thomas Wilson Barnes (1825–1874) was an English chess master, one of the leading British masters of his time.

== Chess history ==
Barnes was one of the leading British chess masters at the time of Paul Morphy's visit to the UK in 1858. Barnes had the best record against Morphy during his visit, winning eight games and losing nineteen (Brace 1977). The only tournament he played in was London in 1862, where he finished in the middle of the field (Hooper & Whyld 1992), (Golombek 1976:148).

== Openings named for Barnes ==
A variation of the Ruy Lopez opening called the Barnes Defence was named after him: 1.e4 e5 2.Nf3 Nc6 3.Bb5 g6 (this is also sometimes known as the Smyslov Defence). A much more dubious variation named for him is Barnes Defence, 1.e4 f6 which he played against Anderssen and Morphy, beating the latter. Barnes Opening, 1.f3, also bears his name. Opening with the f-pawn served his preference to sidestep existing opening knowledge.

== Death ==
Barnes went on a diet and lost 130 pounds (9st 4 lb, approx. 59 kg) in 10 months, which resulted in his death. Barnes was buried 5 days after his death at the Brompton cemetery in London.
