= La Bourdonnais–McDonnell chess matches =

1834 series in London, England

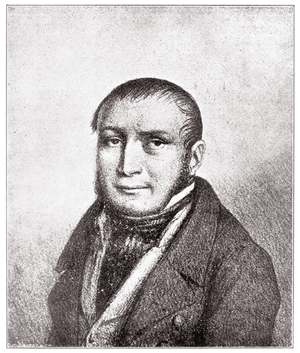
La Bourdonnais

In 1834, chess masters Louis-Charles Mahé de La Bourdonnais of France and Alexander McDonnell of Ireland played a series of chess matches. These matches confirmed La Bourdonnais as the leading chess player in the world. Having been played decades before the title of World Chess Champion existed, they are sometimes seen as having unofficially decided the world's best player.

It was the first match of importance in the history of chess and is sometimes referred to today as the World Championship of 1834. The games were published widely, and were annotated and discussed by enthusiasts all over Europe. In the course of the mammoth encounter, both players introduced several new innovations, a few of which are still seen today. McDonnell, for instance, introduced the McDonnell Gambit variation of the already popular King's Gambit. Considered obsolete by MCO (Modern Chess Openings), this variation is rarely seen today.

La Bourdonnais won the first, third, fourth and fifth matches; McDonnell won the second match, and the sixth was abandoned with McDonnell leading. The overall score was 45 wins to La Bourdonnais, 27 wins to McDonnell, and 13 draws.

== Background ==
De La Bourdonnais was considered the world's leading player from 1821, when he surpassed his mentor Alexandre Deschapelles. In 1823 La Bourdonnais defeated William Lewis, Britain's leading player, in a match in London, and in the spring of 1825 he played and defeated the best players that England had to offer. Nine years later he returned to London when a challenge was issued on McDonnell's behalf.

== La Bourdonnais and McDonnell matches ==
Match summary
Match	La Bourdonnais	draw	McDonnell	Winner
1	16	4	5	La Bourdonnais
2	4	0	5	McDonnell
3	6	1	5	La Bourdonnais
4	8	7	3	La Bourdonnais
5	7	1	4	La Bourdonnais
6	4	0	5	unfinished
Total	45	13	27	

Between June and October 1834 La Bourdonnais and McDonnell played a series of six matches, a total of eighty-five games, at the Westminster Chess Club in London. The games were recorded for posterity by the club's elderly founder William Greenwood Walker, who remained by McDonnell's side for almost the entire duration of the match. Play generally began around noon, some of the games taking more than seven hours to complete. La Bourdonnais knew no English and McDonnell knew no French. It is said that the only word they exchanged during their historic encounter was "check!”

After each game, McDonnell would return to his room exhausted, where he would spend hours pacing back and forth in a state of nervous agitation. Meanwhile, La Bourdonnais would be downstairs regaling himself at the chessboard. He would continue to play till long after midnight, smoking cigars, drinking punch and gambling. One night he reportedly played forty games before going to bed, even though he had to face McDonnell the following morning.

McDonnell and La Bourdonnais were evenly matched in their abilities across the board, but wildly contrasted in their styles of play. The Frenchman was renowned for the rapidity of his play, often replying to his opponent's moves within seconds, whereas the Irishman sometimes took as many as two hours to make a single move. But despite his deliberation, McDonnell was a reckless player. Where the Frenchman preferred to err on the side of caution, the Irishman could not resist embarking on wild and often ill-considered attacks, something which told against him during their encounter.

The characters of the two men were also very different. La Bourdonnais was an ebullient and garrulous individual. When winning, he grew talkative and affable; but when things went against him, he "swore tolerably round oaths in a pretty audible voice", as Walker recorded. McDonnell on the other hand was observed to be taciturn and imperturbable. Winning or losing, he betrayed little emotion at the table, a habit which seemingly unnerved his explosive opponent.

In the first match of the series McDonnell's lack of big-match experience told against him and he was heavily defeated by sixteen games to five, with four draws (+5 -16 =4). But he quickly recovered from this setback and went on to win the second match by five games to four (+5 -4).

Although the title of World Chess Champion was not created until 1886 (with Wilhelm Steinitz as the first champion), the Labourdonnais-McDonnell matches are often regarded in retrospect as an unofficial World Championship.

La Bourdonnais won the third match, by a score of +6 -5 =1. He also won the fourth and fifth matches +8 -3 and +7 -4 respectively. The final match was abandoned in obscure circumstances. Apparently La Bourdonnais was forced to return to France to deal with his creditors. McDonnell was leading +5 -4 at the time. It seems the players had a loose agreement to continue the match at a later date. Another story suggests that La Bourdonnais gave McDonnell odds of a three-game lead, with the first player to reach eight victories being declared the winner, but this is unlikely and impossible to confirm.

Harry Golombek evaluated the games and found them to generally be of low quality. There were some instances of brilliance, but the level of technique, especially in the endgame, was low. In one game, McDonnell had an endgame with a rook and two pawns versus a rook and did not know how to win. He lost his rook due to a blunder and lost the game. La Bourdonnais was not as bad as McDonnell in the endgame but he was weak in the opening. The games lacked any cohesive strategy. There were relatively few draws, but this was partly due to McDonnell's inaccurate defense, which caused him to lose games instead of draw them.

== See also ==
- McDonnell versus De La Bourdonnais, Match 4 (16), London 1834
