= La Bourdonnais =

La Bourdonnais may refer to:

- Bertrand-François Mahé de La Bourdonnais (1699–1753), French naval officer
- Louis-Charles Mahé de La Bourdonnais (1795–1840), chess player and grandson of Bertrand-François
