= McDonnell–La Bourdonnais, match 4, game 16 =

Chess game played in London

Animation of the game

The sixteenth chess game in the fourth match between Alexander McDonnell and Louis-Charles Mahé de La Bourdonnais played in London in 1834 is famous for demonstrating the power of a mobile central block of pawns. Its final position is one of the most famous in the history of the game.

It was one of the earliest games in master chess to employ the Sicilian Defence and was instrumental in popularising the defence.

== Overview ==
Alexander McDonnell from Ireland was a wealthy merchant who was regarded as one of the leading chess players of the time. Louis-Charles Mahé de La Bourdonnais from France was regarded as the unofficial World Chess Champion. The two played a series of six matches in London over the summer of 1834. Of these matches, La Bourdonnais won the first, third, fourth and fifth, McDonnell the second, while the sixth was abandoned with McDonnell leading. In all they played 85 games, of which La Bourdonnais won 45, McDonnell 27 and 13 were draws. This game was the 62nd of the series.

In the game, La Bourdonnais set up a powerful mobile pawn centre very much in the spirit of his predecessor François-André Danican Philidor, who once remarked that pawns were "the soul of chess". He then made an exchange sacrifice at 23.Bxe8?! fxe4! to set these pawns in motion, leading to a series of complicated tactical threats involving the promotion of the pawns that ultimately overwhelms his opponent.

Garry Kasparov observed that this remarkable game remains forever the "French master's visiting card".

== Annotated game ==
White: (Note: McDonnell moved first, but was playing the black pieces so is shown here as playing White to match modern conventions regarding White and Black. For the same reason, quotes from the Chess Player's Chronicle have had their colours reversed.) McDonnell Black: La Bourdonnais Opening: Sicilian Defence, Löwenthal Variation (ECO B32)

(Comments in quotation marks are Howard Staunton's original comments in the Chess Player's Chronicle.)

1. e4 c5

These are the opening moves of the Sicilian Defence, a counterattacking opening in which players typically attack on opposite sides of the board. This game was one of the earliest in master chess to use the opening, helping to establish its popularity.

2. Nf3 Nc6

The knights contend for control of the strategically important d4-square.

3. d4 cxd4 4. Nxd4

A mutually advantageous and time-honoured exchange. White gets a space advantage, while Black keeps both centre pawns and gets a half-open c-file to attack on.

4... e5!?

Kasparov gives this move, which 150 years later became the starting point for the Kalashnikov Variation (albeit with a rather different plan than La Bourdonnais could possibly have entertained when he played it here), an exclamation mark for the accelerated tempo. The trouble with the move is that it creates a backward d-pawn while Black also loses control of the d5-square Black would normally have exercised with the less ambitious 4...e6.

Position: a8 black rook, c8 black bishop, d8 black queen, e8 black king, f8 black bishop, g8 black knight, h8 black rook, a7 black pawn, b7 black pawn, d7 black pawn, f7 black pawn, g7 black pawn, h7 black pawn, c6 white knight, e5 black pawn, e4 white pawn, a2 white pawn, b2 white pawn, c2 white pawn, f2 white pawn, g2 white pawn, h2 white pawn, a1 white rook, b1 white knight, c1 white bishop, d1 white queen, e1 white king, f1 white bishop, h1 white rook

Position after 5.Nxc6?!

5. Nxc6?! (diagram)

"This is not so good as retiring the Knight." (Staunton)

Kasparov remarks that today every schoolchild knows that 5.Nb5 is the right move here. Playing 5.Nxc6 allows Black to regain control of the d5-square when Black retakes the knight with a pawn. Nevertheless Kasparov reminds us that in those days chess masters aimed for rapid development and an attack, without paying too much attention to positional nuances such as a weak d5-square.

5... bxc6

Not 5...dxc6 because this would mean Black is giving up a centre pawn as well as leaving himself open to an exchange of queens that would prevent him from castling.

6. Bc4 Nf6 7. Bg5?!

Planning to exchange the bishop and knight. Kasparov prefers 7.0-0!

7... Be7

Developing the bishop as well as unpinning Black's f6-knight and ensuring that after an exchange on f6, White's bishop can be retaken with the e7-bishop and not with the g7-pawn, which would weaken Black's defensive kingside pawn structure.

Position: a8 black rook, c8 black bishop, d8 black queen, e8 black king, h8 black rook, a7 black pawn, d7 black pawn, e7 black bishop, f7 black pawn, g7 black pawn, h7 black pawn, c6 black pawn, f6 black knight, e5 black pawn, g5 white bishop, c4 white bishop, e4 white pawn, a2 white pawn, b2 white pawn, c2 white pawn, e2 white queen, f2 white pawn, g2 white pawn, h2 white pawn, a1 white rook, b1 white knight, e1 white king, h1 white rook

Position after 8.Qe2?!

8. Qe2?! (diagram)

Allowing Black to advance 8...d5 the next move (the d5-square is now only attacked twice by White whereas it is defended three times by Black), a considerable strategic goal for Black in the Sicilian Defence. That the queen is bringing pressure to bear on e5 is unlikely to be relevant until White is safely castled. Burgess, Nunn and Emms prefer either 8.Nc3 or 8.Bxf6 followed by 9.Nc3.

8... d5 9. Bxf6?

Kasparov calls 9.Bxf6? a serious error, pointless and anti-positional.

9... Bxf6 10. Bb3 0-0 11. 0-0 a5

11...a5 carries a double threat. First, it threatens 12...a4, trapping the white bishop; second, it brings the a6-square under rook protection, allowing 12...Ba6 pinning the white queen against the rook with a potential exchange advantage. White responds by making concessions in the centre.

Position: a8 black rook, c8 black bishop, d8 black queen, f8 black rook, g8 black king, f7 black pawn, g7 black pawn, h7 black pawn, f6 black bishop, a5 black pawn, e5 black pawn, c4 white pawn, d4 black pawn, b3 white bishop, a2 white pawn, b2 white pawn, e2 white queen, f2 white pawn, g2 white pawn, h2 white pawn, a1 white rook, b1 white knight, d1 white rook, g1 white king

Position after 14.c4?!

12. exd5 cxd5 13. Rd1 d4 14. c4?! (diagram)

"Queen's Bishop's Pawn one square [i.e. 14.c3] would have been better play." (Staunton)

McDonnell decides on a pawn race, but his passed c-pawn is not likely to be as strong as La Bourdonnais' supported passed d-pawn. Kasparov considers this the decisive mistake. White should instead develop his knight with 14.Nd2.

14... Qb6 15. Bc2 Bb7

"It is pretty obvious that Black would have lost his Queen if he had taken the Queen's Knight's Pawn [i.e. 15...Qxb2??]." (Staunton)

15...Bb7 supports e4. 15...Qxb2?? loses the queen to 16.Bxh7+.

Position: e8 black rook, f8 black rook, g8 black king, b7 black bishop, f7 black pawn, g7 black pawn, h7 black pawn, b6 black queen, f6 black bishop, a5 black pawn, e5 black pawn, c4 white pawn, d4 black pawn, a2 white pawn, b2 white pawn, c2 white bishop, d2 white knight, e2 white queen, f2 white pawn, g2 white pawn, h2 white pawn, a1 white rook, d1 white rook, g1 white king

Position after 16...Rae8!

16. Nd2 Rae8! (diagram)

A frequent dilemma in chess play is which back rank rook to choose to cover a particular file. In this case La Bourdonnais made the good decision to use his a-file rook to cover the e-file, leaving his f-file rook in place, thus supporting the pawns that in turn support his passed d-pawn.

Although 16...Qxb2 is no longer a direct blunder, White can win the e-pawn back with the threats 17.Qd3 followed by 18.Rab1 if this is not followed directly by 17...e4, leading to a probable draw, or elect for some sharp play with the Greek gift sacrifice 17.Bxh7+!? Kxh7 18.Rab1.

17. Ne4 Bd8

Black's threat is 18...f5!, starting the centre pawn surge. White must react quickly.

18. c5 Qc6

White pushes his pawn forward, threatening the queen. Black still can't play 18...Qxb2? as this loses the queen, if less expensively, to 19.Nf6+ gxf6 20.Bxh7+.

19. f3

White plans to defend the e5-square with 20.Nd6. But White must first prevent the immediate 19...Qxg2# were White to play this now.

19... Be7

Black neutralises the Nd6 threat and prepares for queenside play.

Position: e8 black rook, f8 black rook, g8 black king, b7 black bishop, e7 black bishop, g7 black pawn, h7 black pawn, c6 black queen, a5 black pawn, c5 white pawn, e5 black pawn, f5 black pawn, d4 black pawn, e4 white knight, f3 white pawn, a2 white pawn, b2 white pawn, c2 white bishop, e2 white queen, g2 white pawn, h2 white pawn, c1 white rook, d1 white rook, g1 white king

Position after 20...f5!

20. Rac1 f5! (diagram)

Kasparov calls this the beginning of the end. Burgess, Nunn and Emms remark that Black wastes no time preparing a defence against a White queenside attack. Nevertheless, Black can't play 20...Bxc5?? due to 21.Nxc5 and the same Bxh7+ motif as before.

21. Qc4+ Kh8!

The best defence. 21...Qd5? leads to an exchange of queens and a loss of Black's initiative after responses such as 22.Bb3 or 22.Qb5, while 21...Rf7? 22.Ba4 leads to Black losing the exchange without the compensation of an attack.

22. Ba4 Qh6

"Black's play from this point to the end of the game is well deserving attention." (Staunton)

White's bishop pinned the queen against the rook, threatening to win the exchange. Black is unfazed.

23. Bxe8?!

Kasparov says that 23.Nd6! was the last chance White had for sharper play. Burgess, Nunn and Emms agree, and observe that Black must play extremely precisely to maintain the advantage. Kasparov gives 23.Nd6! Bxd6 24.cxd6 Rc8 and Black wins.

Position: e8 white bishop, f8 black rook, h8 black king, b7 black bishop, e7 black bishop, g7 black pawn, h7 black pawn, h6 black queen, a5 black pawn, c5 white pawn, e5 black pawn, c4 white queen, d4 black pawn, e4 black pawn, f3 white pawn, a2 white pawn, b2 white pawn, g2 white pawn, h2 white pawn, c1 white rook, d1 white rook, g1 white king

Position after 23...fxe4!

23... fxe4! (diagram)

Black unleashes a pawn "tsunami" that sweeps everything away before it.

24. c6 exf3! 25. Rc2

"If White had ventured to take the Bishop [i.e. 25.cxb7??], he would have been mated by force in five or six moves." (Staunton)

25.cxb7?? brings 25...Qe3+ forcing mate after 26.Kf1 (or Kh1) fxg2+ 27.Kxg2 when White is exposed to a rook and queen attack he cannot defend, e.g. 27...Rf2+ 28.Kg1 Rxb2+ (an example of a discovered check) 29.Kh1 Qf3+ 30.Kg1 Qg2#. On the other hand, 25.gxf3?? brings 25...Qe3+ 26.Kg2 (or Kh1) Qxf3+ 27.Kg1 Rf5 threatening ...Rg5# and similarly White can't escape.

Position: e8 white bishop, f8 black rook, h8 black king, b7 black bishop, e7 black bishop, g7 black pawn, h7 black pawn, c6 white pawn, a5 black pawn, e5 black pawn, c4 white queen, d4 black pawn, e3 black queen, f3 black pawn, a2 white pawn, b2 white pawn, c2 white rook, g2 white pawn, h2 white pawn, d1 white rook, g1 white king

Position after 25...Qe3+?!

25... Qe3+?! (diagram)

La Bourdonnais won the game with this move, but it must be regarded as dubious given that 26.Rf2! limits Black to a draw.

26. Kh1??

A final mistake. White retreats into the corner, but is now powerless in the face of either of the pawn advances to d3 or f2. Curiously, a much better defence is provided by the self-pin 26.Rf2! that David LeMoir has analysed. Black has the tactically strong response 26...fxg2, but this is neutralised by 27.Qe2 whereupon an exchange of queens gives White the stronger passed pawn. Black gets better play with 26...Bc8, but White should nevertheless hold him to a draw after 27.Bd7.

26... Bc8 27. Bd7

Black was threatening either 27...Bf5 or 27...Bg4, both of which are fatal for White. 27.Bf7 (trying to block off the black rook instead) leads to lines like 27...Bg4 28.c7? fxg2+ that win for Black. Kasparov notes that computers suggest 27...d3 directly.

Position: c8 black bishop, f8 black rook, h8 black king, d7 white bishop, e7 black bishop, g7 black pawn, h7 black pawn, c6 white pawn, a5 black pawn, e5 black pawn, c4 white queen, d4 black pawn, e3 black queen, a2 white pawn, b2 white pawn, c2 white rook, f2 black pawn, g2 white pawn, h2 white pawn, d1 white rook, h1 white king

Position after 27...f2

27... f2 (diagram) 28. Rf1

Black was threatening both 28...d3 and 28...Qe1+. As an example of the tactical play involved here, suppose White ignores these threats and makes an essentially pointless move such as 28.c7 in the pious hope of helping his pawn on to queen. Then Black responds 28...Qe1+. If White plays 29.Rxe1 then it is mate in two with 29...fxe1=Q+ 30.Qf1 Qxf1#. So White is forced to respond to the check by interposing with 29.Qf1, leading to mate again after 29...Qxd1 30.Qxd1 f1=Q+ 31.Qxf1 Rxf1#.

28... d3 29. Rc3 Bxd7 30. cxd7 e4

28...d3 was threatening mate in 12 beginning ...dxc2. After 30...e4, the threat is ...Qe1 and mate in 13. Burgess, Nunn and Emms remark that there is not much White can do about it. For example, White can give his king a getaway square with 31.h3, but if he uses it, 31...Qe1 32.Kh2, he gets mated in a few moves beginning with 32...Bd6+. So White is obliged to reply 32.Rc1, after which 32...d2 33.Rd1 e3 gives Black a mate in 10.

31. Qc8 Bd8

White tries a last-ditch attack, but Black just deflects it with his bishop. Black could also have played 31...Rd8!? 32.Rcc1 d2 33.Rcd1 Qe1.

32. Qc4 Qe1! 33. Rc1 d2 34. Qc5 Rg8 35. Rd1 e3

After 35.Rd1, Black has a mate in 10. If White had played 35.Rfxe1 (or similarly 35.Rcxe1), Black can just clear the back rank: 35...dxe1=Q+ 36.Rxe1 fxe1=Q+ 37.Qg1 Qxg1+, winning.

36. Qc3

This move allows what Burgess, Nunn and Emms call "a truly magical finish".

36... Qxd1! 37. Rxd1 e2 (diagram) 0–1

Black has a forced mate in five (White can hold out a little longer with 38.h4), and White resigned.

Position: d8 black bishop, g8 black rook, h8 black king, d7 white pawn, g7 black pawn, h7 black pawn, a5 black pawn, c3 white queen, a2 white pawn, b2 white pawn, d2 black pawn, e2 black pawn, f2 black pawn, g2 white pawn, h2 white pawn, d1 white rook, h1 white king

Final position after 37...e2

They are buried near one another in Kensal Green Cemetery, where amongst others they join Charles Babbage, the Victorian computer scientist whose difference engine paved the way for the modern chess engine that so enhances an appreciation of their game.
