= World Chess Championship =

Competition to determine the World Chess Champion

Gukesh Dommaraju of India, the current world chess champion (2026)

The World Chess Championship is played to determine the world champion in chess. The current world champion is Gukesh Dommaraju, who defeated the previous champion Ding Liren in the 2024 World Chess Championship.

The first event recognised as a world championship was the 1886 match between Wilhelm Steinitz and Johannes Zukertort. Steinitz won, making him the first world champion. From 1886 to 1946, the champion set the terms, requiring any challenger to raise a sizable stake and defeat the champion in a match in order to become the new champion. Following the death of reigning world champion Alexander Alekhine in 1946, the International Chess Federation (FIDE) took over administration of the World Championship, beginning with the 1948 tournament. From 1948 to 1993, FIDE organised a set of tournaments and matches to choose a new challenger for the world championship match, which was held every three years.

Before the 1993 match, then reigning champion Garry Kasparov and his championship rival Nigel Short broke away from FIDE, and conducted the match under the umbrella of the newly formed Professional Chess Association. FIDE conducted its own tournament, which was won by Anatoly Karpov, and led to a rival claimant to the title of World Champion for the next thirteen years until 2006. The titles were unified at the World Chess Championship 2006, and all the subsequent tournaments and matches have once again been administered by FIDE. Since the World Chess Championship 2014, the championship has settled on a two-year cycle, with championship matches conducted every even year.

Emanuel Lasker was the longest serving World Champion, having held the title for 27 years, and holds the record for the most Championship wins with six along with Kasparov and Karpov.

Though the world championship is open to all players, there are separate championships for women, under-20s and lower age groups, and seniors. There are also chess world championships in rapid, blitz, correspondence, problem solving, Fischer random chess and computer chess.

== History ==
=== Early champions (pre-1886) ===
==== Before 1851 ====
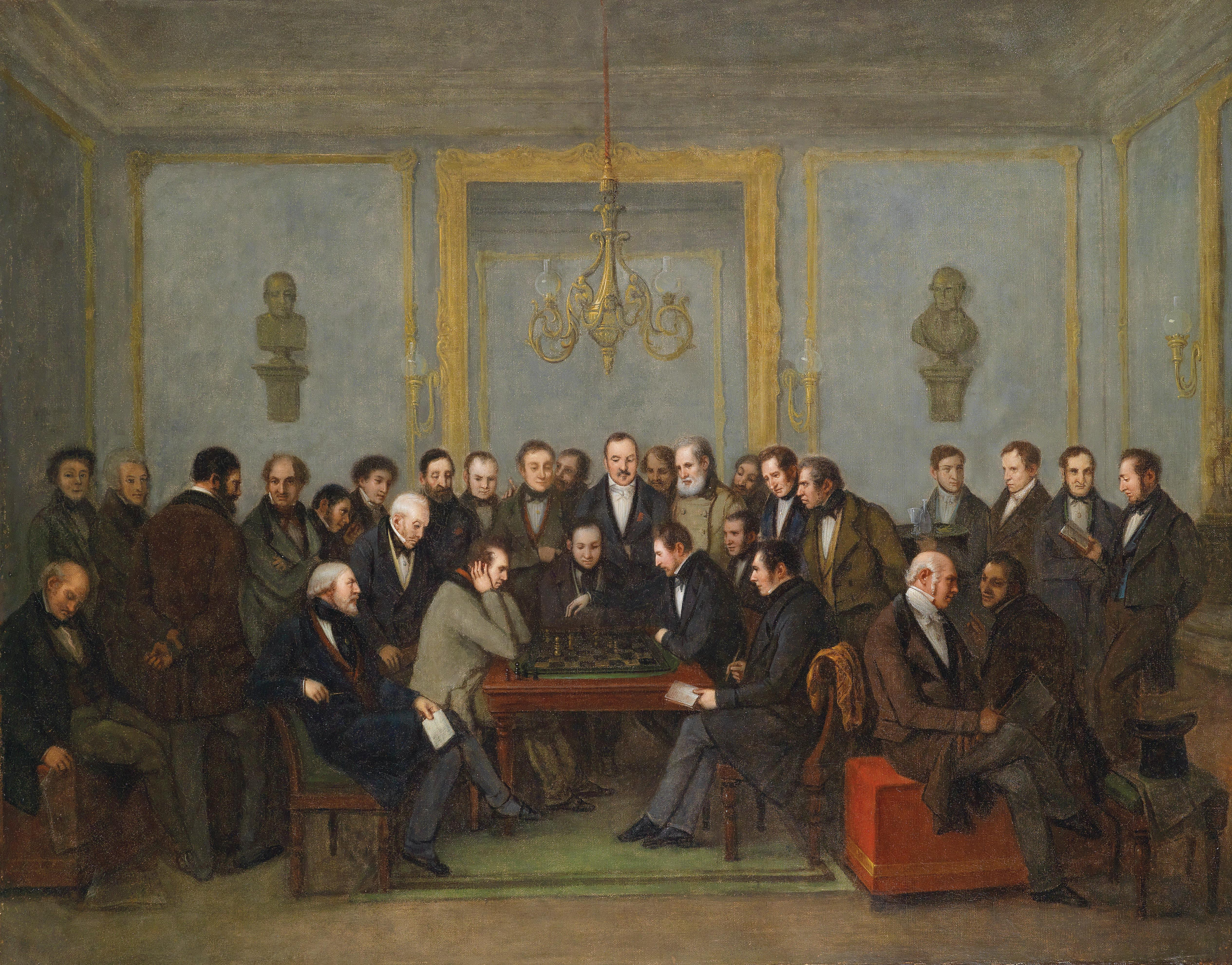
A depiction of the chess match between Howard Staunton and Pierre Saint-Amant, on 16 December 1843

The game of chess in its modern form emerged in Spain in the 15th century, though rule variations persisted until the late 19th century. Before Wilhelm Steinitz and Johannes Zukertort in the late 19th century, no chess player seriously claimed to be champion of the world. The phrase was used by some chess writers to describe other players of their day, and the status of being the best at the time has sometimes been awarded in retrospect, going back to the early 17th-century Italian player Gioachino Greco (the first player where complete games survive). Richard Lambe, in his 1764 book The History of Chess, wrote that the 18th-century French player François-André Danican Philidor was "supposed to be the best Chess-player in the world". Philidor wrote an extremely successful chess book (Analyse du jeu des Échecs) and gave public demonstrations of his blindfold chess skills. However, some of Philidor's contemporaries were not convinced by the analysis Philidor gave in his book (e.g. the Modenese Masters), and some more recent authors have echoed these doubts.

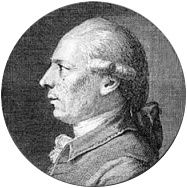
François-André Danican Philidor, reputed to be the best player of the late eighteenth century

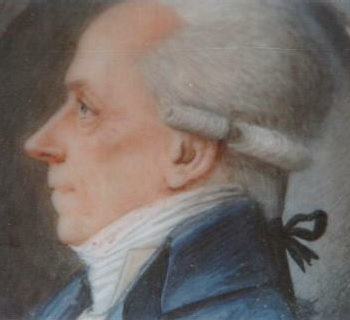
Alexandre Deschapelles, reputed to be the best player in the early nineteenth century

In the early 19th century, it was generally considered that the French player Alexandre Deschapelles was the strongest player of the time, though three games between him and the English player William Lewis in 1821 suggests that they were on par. After Deschapelles and Lewis withdrew from play, the strongest players competing in France and Britain respectively were recognised as Louis de la Bourdonnais and Alexander McDonnell. La Bourdonnais visited England in 1825, where he played many games against Lewis and won most of them, and defeated all the other English masters despite offering handicaps. He and McDonnell contested a long series of matches in 1834. These were the first to be adequately reported, and they somewhat resemble the later world championship matches. Approximately 85 games (the true number is up for historical debate) were played, with La Bourdonnais winning a majority of the games.

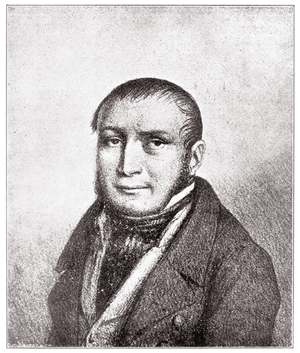
Louis de la Bourdonnais, the world's strongest player from 1821 to his death in 1840

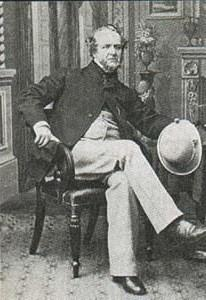
Howard Staunton, generally reckoned the world's leading player of the 1840s

In 1839, George Walker wrote "The sceptre of chess, in Europe, has been for the last century, at least, wielded by a Gallic dynasty. It has passed from Legalle [Philidor's teacher, whom Philidor regarded as being a player equal to himself, according to Deschapelles] to La Bourdonnais, through the grasp, successively, of Philidor, Bernard, Carlier [two members of La Société des Amateurs], and Deschapelles". In 1840, a columnist in Fraser's Magazine (who was probably Walker) wrote, "Will Gaul continue the dynasty by placing a fourth Frenchman on the throne of the world? the three last chess chiefs having been successively Philidor, Deschapelles, and De La Bourdonnais."

After La Bourdonnais' death in December 1840, Englishman Howard Staunton's match victory over another Frenchman, Pierre Charles Fournier de Saint-Amant, in 1843 is considered to have established Staunton as the world's strongest player, at least in England and France. By the 1830s, players from Germany and more generally Central Europe were beginning to appear on the scene: the strongest of the Berlin players around 1840 was probably Ludwig Bledow, co-founder of the Berlin Pleiades. The earliest recorded use of the term "World Champion" was in 1845, when Staunton was described as "the Chess Champion of England, or ... the Champion of the World".

==== From 1851 to 1886 ====
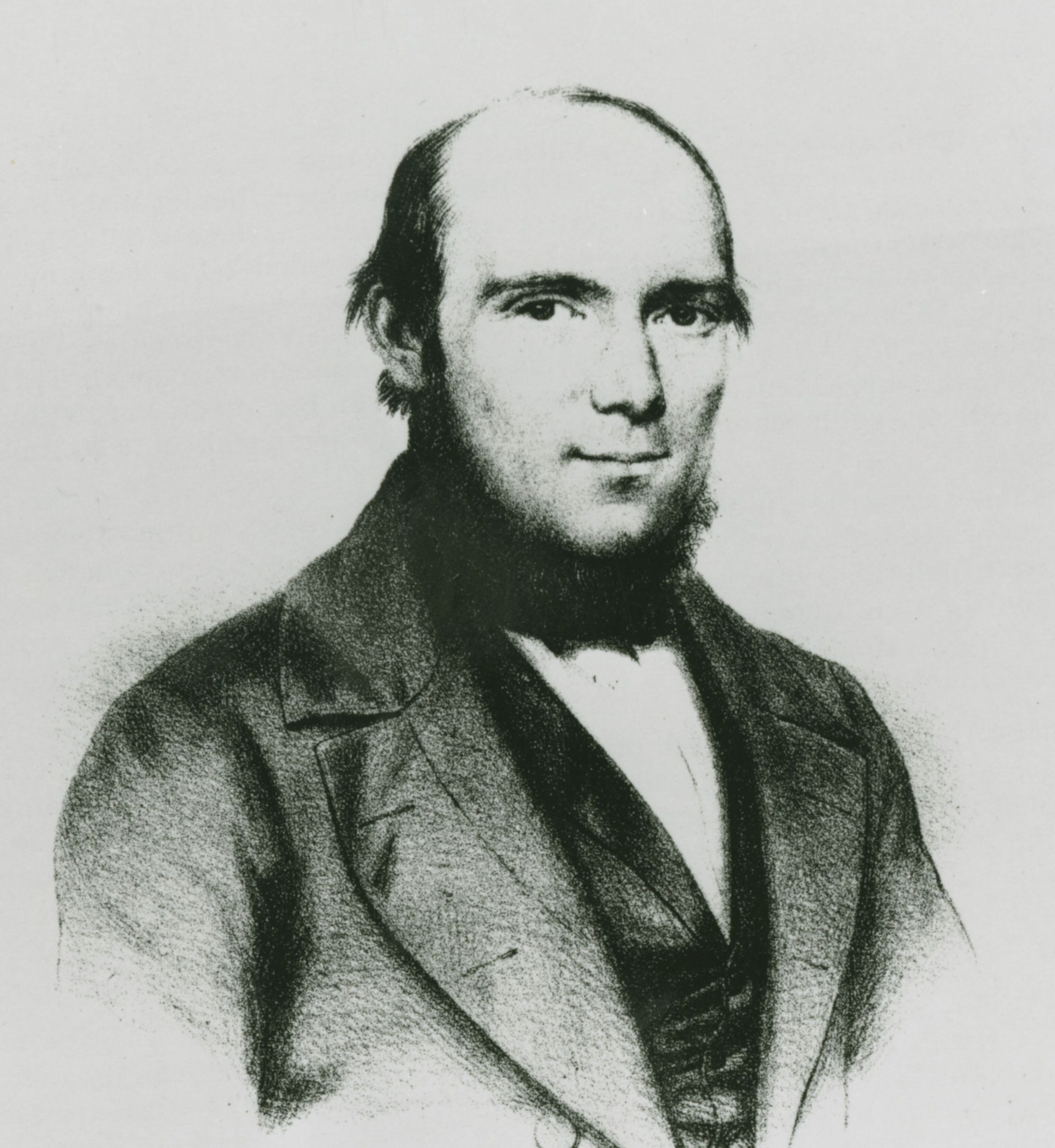
Adolf Anderssen, who won three strong international tournaments and is often considered the world's leading player around the mid-nineteenth century

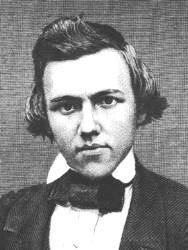
Paul Morphy, who dominated all of his opposition during his brief chess career before retiring from chess at the age of 21 in 1859

An important milestone was the London 1851 chess tournament, which was the first international chess tournament, organised by Staunton. It was played as a series of matches, and was won convincingly by the German Adolf Anderssen, including a 4–1 semi-final win over Staunton. This established Anderssen as the world's leading player. In 1893, Henry Bird retrospectively awarded the title of first world chess champion to Anderssen for his victory, but there is no evidence that he was widely acclaimed as such at the time, and no mention of such a status afterwards in the tournament book by Staunton. Indeed, Staunton's tournament book calls Anderssen "after Heydebrand der Laza [Tassilo von der Lasa, another of the Berlin Pleiades], the best player of Germany": von der Lasa was unable to attend the 1851 tournament, though he was invited. In 1851, Anderssen lost a match to von der Lasa; in 1856, George Walker wrote that "[von der Lasa] and Anderssen are decidedly the two best in the known world". Von der Lasa did not compete in tournaments or formal matches because of the demands of his diplomatic career, but his games show that he was one of the world's best then: he won series of games against Staunton in 1844 and 1853.

Anderssen was himself decisively beaten in an 1858 match against the American Paul Morphy (7–2, 2 draws). In 1858–59 Morphy played matches against several leading players, beating them all. This prompted some commentators at the time to call him the world champion: Gabriel-Éloy Doazan, who knew Morphy, wrote that "one can and...must place [him] in the same bracket" as Deschapelles and La Bourdonnais, who Doazan had played years before, and that "his superiority is as obvious as theirs". But when Morphy returned to America in 1859, he abruptly retired from chess, though many considered him the world champion until his death in 1884. His sudden withdrawal from chess at his peak led to his being known as "the pride and sorrow of chess".

After Morphy's retirement from chess, Anderssen was again regarded as the world's strongest active player, a reputation he reinforced by winning the strong London 1862 chess tournament. Louis Paulsen and Ignatz Kolisch were also playing at a comparable standard to Anderssen in the 1860s: Anderssen narrowly won a match against Kolisch in 1861, and drew against Paulsen in 1862.

In 1866, Wilhelm Steinitz narrowly defeated Anderssen in a match (8–6, 0 draws). However, he was not immediately able to conclusively demonstrate his superiority. Steinitz placed third at the Paris 1867 chess tournament, behind Kolisch and Szymon Winawer; he placed second at the Dundee 1867 tournament, behind Gustav Neumann; and he again placed second at the Baden-Baden 1870 chess tournament, which was the strongest that had been held to date (Anderssen came first, and won twice against Steinitz). Steinitz confirmed his standing as the world's leading player by winning the London 1872 tournament, winning a match against Johannes Zukertort in 1872 (7–1, 4 draws), winning the Vienna 1873 chess tournament and decisively winning a match over Joseph Henry Blackburne 7–0 (0 draws) in 1876.

Apart from the Blackburne match, Steinitz played no competitive chess between the Vienna 1873 chess tournament and Vienna 1882 chess tournament. During that time, Zukertort emerged as the world's leading active player, winning the Paris 1878 chess tournament. Zukertort then won the London 1883 chess tournament by a convincing 3-point margin, ahead of nearly every leading player in the world, with Steinitz finishing second. This tournament established Steinitz and Zukertort as the best two players in the world, and led to a match between these two, the World Chess Championship 1886, won by Steinitz.

There is some debate over whether to date Steinitz's reign as world champion from his win over Anderssen in 1866, or from his win over Zukertort in 1886. The 1886 match was clearly agreed to be for the world championship, but there is no indication that Steinitz was regarded as the defending champion. There is also no known evidence of Steinitz being called the world champion after defeating Anderssen in 1866. It has been suggested that Steinitz could not make such a claim while Morphy was alive. (Morphy died in 1884.) There are a number of references to Steinitz as world champion in the 1870s, the earliest being after the first Zukertort match in 1872. Later, in 1879, it was argued that Zukertort was world champion, since Morphy and Steinitz were not active. Later in his career, however, at least from 1887, Steinitz dated his reign from this 1866 match, and early sources such as The New York Times in 1894, Emanuel Lasker in 1908 and Reuben Fine in 1952 all do the same.

Many modern commentators divide Steinitz's reign into an "unofficial" one from 1866 to 1886, and an "official" one after 1886. By this reckoning, the first World Championship match was the World Chess Championship 1886, and Steinitz was the first official World Chess Champion.

=== Champions before FIDE (1886–1946) ===
==== Reign of Wilhelm Steinitz (1886–1894) ====
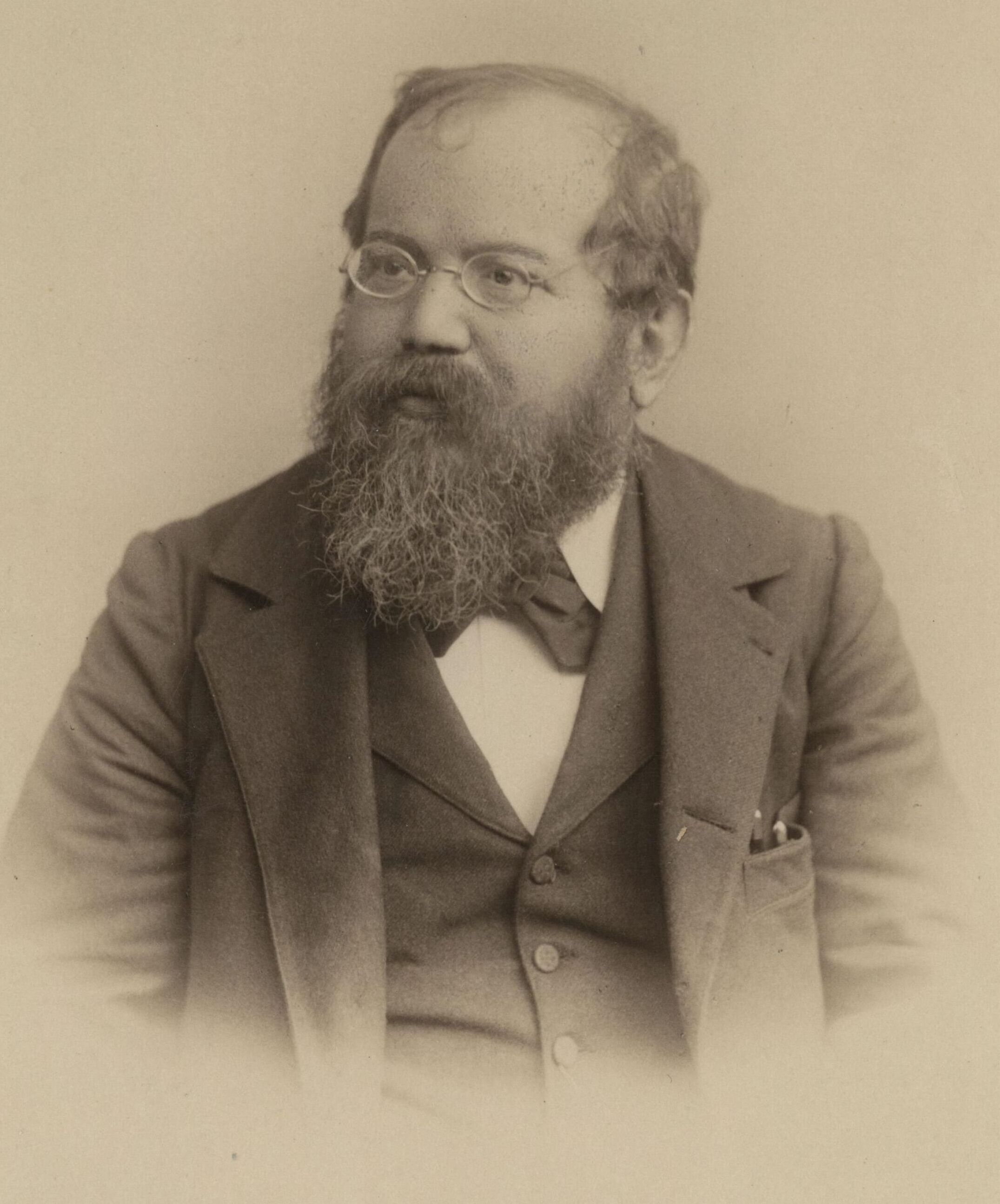
Wilhelm Steinitz dominated chess from 1866 to 1894. Some commentators date his time as World Champion from 1866; others from 1886.

Following the Steinitz–Zukertort match, a tradition continued of the world championship being decided by a match between the reigning champion, and a challenger: if a player thought he was strong enough, he (or his friends) would find financial backing for a match purse and challenge the reigning world champion. If he won, he would become the new champion.

Steinitz successfully defended his world title against Mikhail Chigorin in 1889, Isidor Gunsberg in 1891 and Chigorin again in 1892.

In 1887, the American Chess Congress started work on drawing up regulations for the future conduct of world championship contests. Steinitz supported this endeavor, as he thought he was becoming too old to remain world champion. The proposal evolved through many forms (as Steinitz pointed out, such a project had never been undertaken before), and resulted in the 1889 tournament in New York to select a challenger for Steinitz, rather like the more recent Candidates Tournaments. The tournament was duly played, but the outcome was not quite as planned: Chigorin and Max Weiss tied for first place; their play-off resulted in four draws; and neither wanted to play a match against Steinitz – Chigorin had just lost to him, and Weiss wanted to get back to his work for the Rothschild Bank. The third prizewinner, Isidor Gunsberg, was prepared to play Steinitz for the title in New York, so this match was played in 1890–1891 and was won by Steinitz. The experiment was not repeated, and Steinitz's later matches were private arrangements between the players.

Two young strong players emerged in late 1880s and early 1890s: Siegbert Tarrasch and Emanuel Lasker. Tarrasch had the better tournament results at the time, but it was Lasker who was able to raise the money to challenge Steinitz. Lasker won the 1894 match and succeeded Steinitz as world champion.

==== Emanuel Lasker (1894–1921) ====
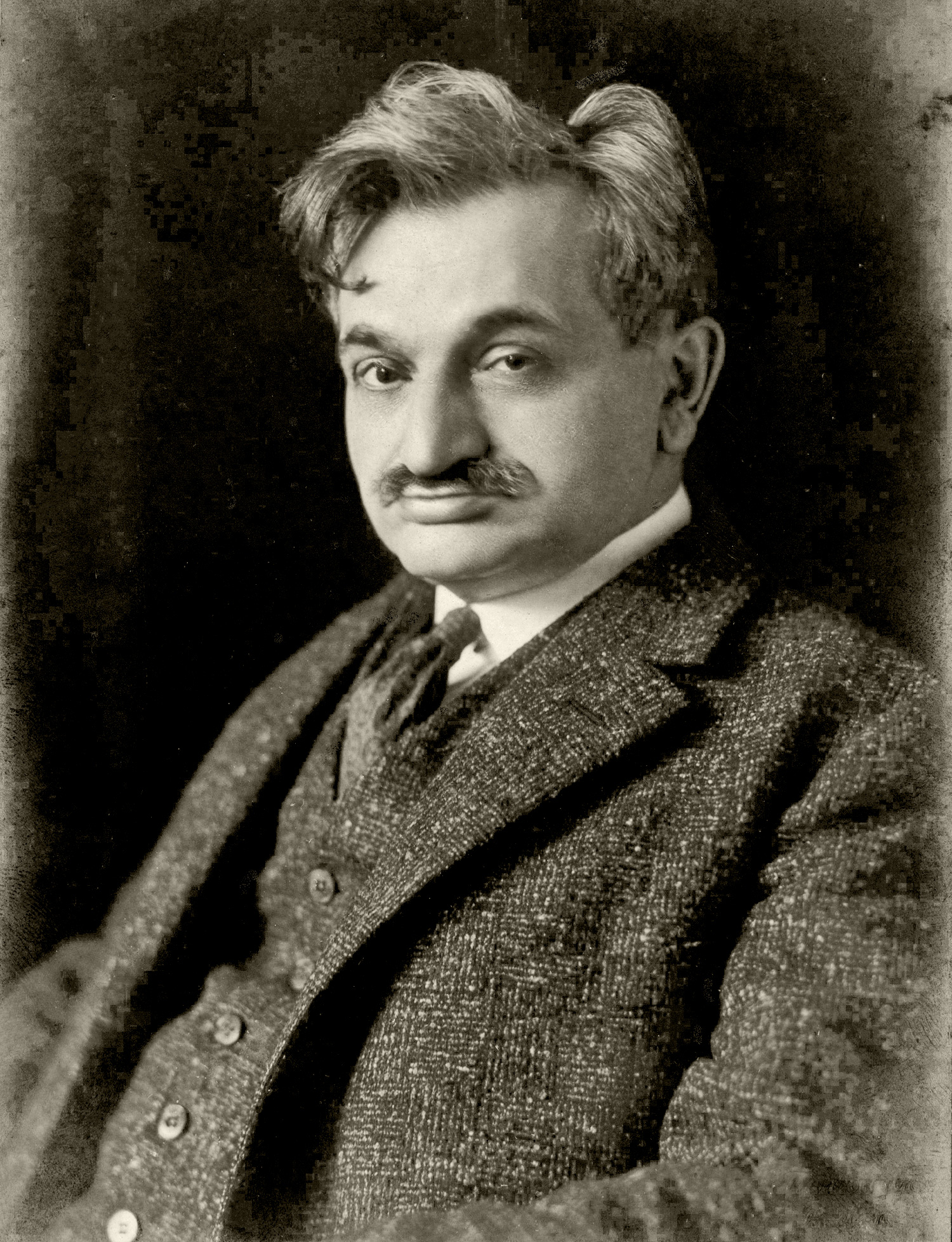
Emanuel Lasker was the World Champion for 27 years consecutively from 1894 to 1921, the longest reign of a World Champion. During that period, he played seven World Championship matches.

Lasker held the title from 1894 to 1921, the longest reign (27 years) of any champion. He won a return match against Steinitz in 1897, and then did not defend his title for ten years, before playing four title defences in four years. He comfortably defeated Frank Marshall in 1907 and Siegbert Tarrasch in 1908. In 1910, he almost lost his title in a short tied match against Carl Schlechter, although the exact conditions of this match are a mystery. He then defeated Dawid Janowski in the most one-sided title match in history later in 1910.

Lasker's negotiations for title matches from 1911 onwards were extremely controversial. In 1911, he received a challenge for a world title match against José Raúl Capablanca and, in addition to making severe financial demands, proposed some novel conditions: the match should be considered drawn if neither player finished with a two-game lead; and it should have a maximum of 30 games, but finish if either player won six games and had a two-game lead (previous matches had been won by the first to win a certain number of games, usually 10; in theory, such a match might go on for ever). Capablanca objected to the two-game lead clause; Lasker took offence at the terms in which Capablanca criticized the two-game lead condition and broke off negotiations.

Further controversy arose when, in 1912, Lasker's terms for a proposed match with Akiba Rubinstein included a clause that, if Lasker should resign the title after a date had been set for the match, Rubinstein should become world champion. When he resumed negotiations with Capablanca after World War I, Lasker insisted on a similar clause that if Lasker should resign the title after a date had been set for the match, Capablanca should become world champion. On 27 June 1920 Lasker abdicated in favour of Capablanca because of public criticism of the terms of the match, naming Capablanca as his successor. Some commentators questioned Lasker's right to name his successor; Amos Burn raised the same objection but welcomed Lasker's resignation of the title. Capablanca argued that, if the champion abdicated, the title must go to the challenger, as any other arrangement would be unfair to the challenger.

==== Capablanca, Alekhine and Euwe (1921–1946) ====
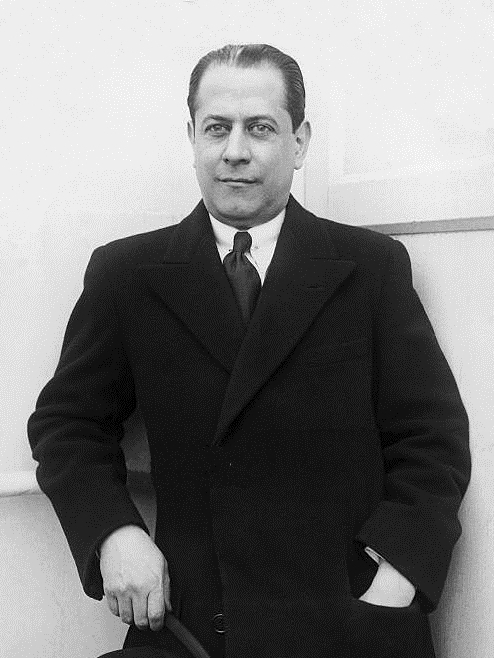
José Raúl Capablanca reigned as World Champion from 1921 to 1927, and proposed the short-lived "London Rules" for future Championship matches.

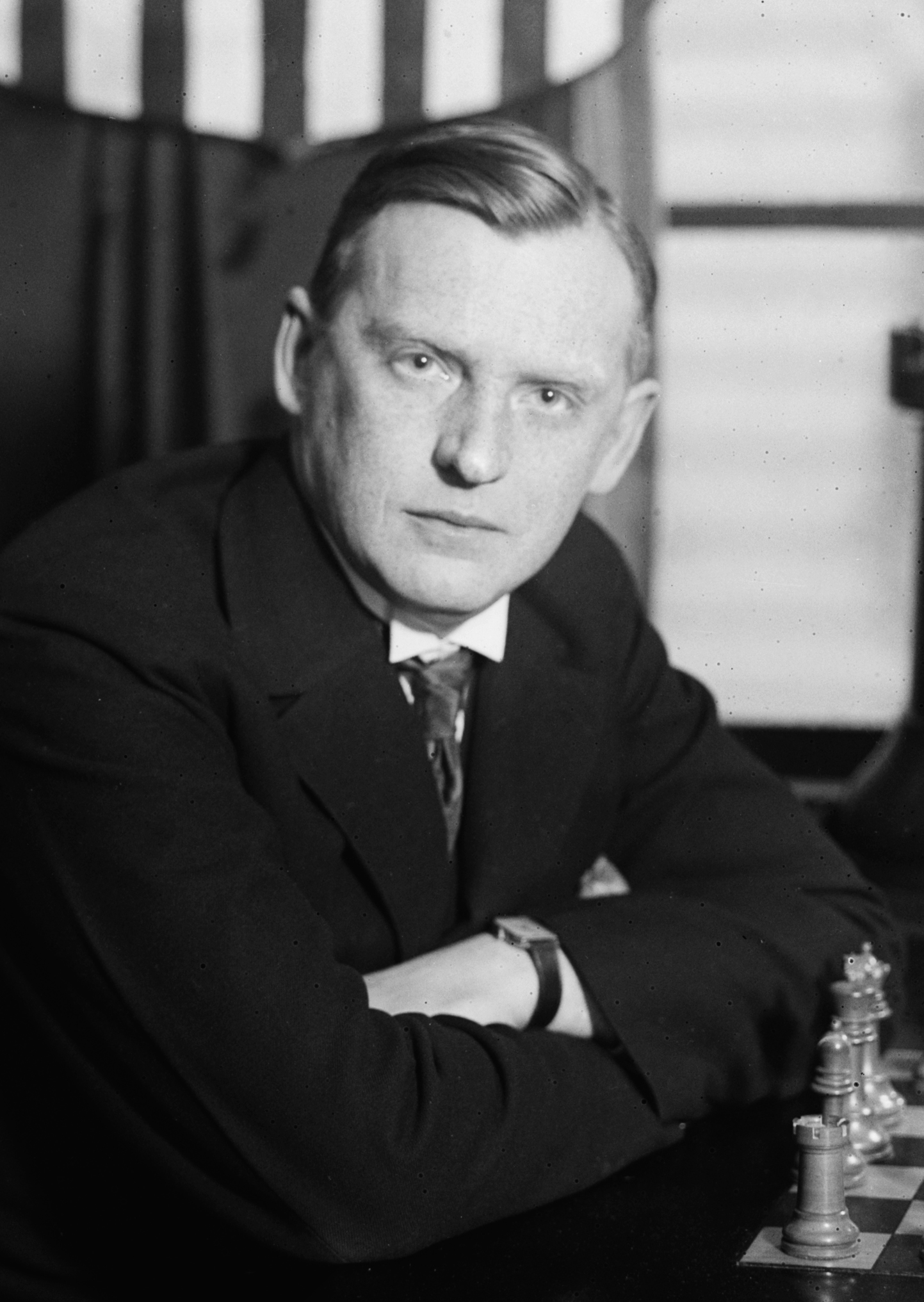
Alexander Alekhine was the World Champion from 1927 to 1935 and again from 1937 to his death in 1946. He is the only World Champion to die while holding the title.

Lasker later agreed to play a match against Capablanca in 1921, announcing that, if he won, he would resign the title so that younger masters could compete for it. Capablanca won their 1921 match by four wins, ten draws and no losses.

After the breakdown of his first attempt to negotiate a title match against Lasker (1911), Capablanca had drafted rules for the conduct of future challenges, which were agreed to by the other top players, including Lasker, at the 1914 Saint Petersburg tournament and approved at the Mannheim Congress later that year. The main points were: the champion must be prepared to defend his title once a year; the match should be won by the first player to win six or eight games (the champion had the right to choose); and the stake should be at least £1,000 (about £100,000 in current terms). Following the controversies surrounding his 1921 match against Lasker, in 1922 world champion Capablanca proposed the "London Rules": the first player to win six games would win the match; playing sessions would be limited to 5 hours; the time limit would be 40 moves in 2½ hours; the champion must defend his title within one year of receiving a challenge from a recognised master; the champion would decide the date of the match; the champion was not obliged to accept a challenge for a purse of less than US$10,000 (about $180,000 in current terms); 20% of the purse was to be paid to the title holder, and the remainder being divided, 60% going to the winner of the match, and 40% to the loser; the highest purse bid must be accepted. Alexander Alekhine, Efim Bogoljubow, Géza Maróczy, Richard Réti, Akiba Rubinstein, Savielly Tartakower and Milan Vidmar promptly signed them. The only match played under those rules was Capablanca vs Alekhine in 1927, although there has been speculation that the actual contract might have included a "two-game lead" clause.

Alekhine, Rubinstein and Aron Nimzowitsch had all challenged Capablanca in the early 1920s but only Alekhine could raise the US$10,000 Capablanca demanded and only in 1927. Capablanca was shockingly upset by the new challenger. Before the match, almost nobody gave Alekhine a chance against the dominant Cuban, but Alekhine overcame Capablanca's natural skill with his unmatched drive and extensive preparation (especially deep opening analysis, which became a hallmark of most future grandmasters). The aggressive Alekhine was helped by his tactical skill, which complicated the game. Immediately after winning, Alekhine announced that he was willing to grant Capablanca a return match provided Capablanca met the requirements of the "London Rules". Negotiations dragged on for several years, often breaking down when agreement seemed in sight. Alekhine easily won two title matches against Efim Bogoljubov in 1929 and 1934. In 1935, Alekhine was unexpectedly defeated by the Dutch Max Euwe, an amateur player who worked as a mathematics teacher. Alekhine convincingly won a rematch in 1937. World War II temporarily prevented any further world title matches, and Alekhine remained world champion until his death in 1946.

==== Financing ====
Before 1948 world championship matches were financed by arrangements similar to those Emanuel Lasker described for his 1894 match with Wilhelm Steinitz: either the challenger or both players, with the assistance of financial backers, would contribute to a purse; about half would be distributed to the winner's backers, and the winner would receive the larger share of the remainder (the loser's backers got nothing). The players had to meet their own travel, accommodation, food and other expenses out of their shares of the purse. This system evolved out of the wagering of small stakes on club games in the early 19th century.

Up to and including the 1894 Steinitz–Lasker match, both players, with their backers, generally contributed equally to the purse, following the custom of important matches in the 19th century before there was a generally recognised world champion. For example: the stakes were £100 a side in both the second Staunton vs Saint-Amant match (Paris, 1843) and the Anderssen vs Steinitz match (London, 1866); Steinitz and Zukertort played their 1886 match for £400 a side. Lasker introduced the practice of demanding that the challenger should provide the whole of the purse, and his successors followed his example up to World War II. This requirement made arranging world championship matches more difficult, for example: Frank James Marshall challenged Lasker in 1904 but could not raise the money until 1907; in 1911 Lasker and Akiba Rubinstein agreed in principle to a world championship match, but this was never played as Rubinstein could not raise the money. In the early 1920s, Alekhine, Rubinstein and Nimzowitsch all challenged Capablanca, but only Alekhine was able to raise the US$10,000 that Capablanca demanded, and not until 1927.

=== FIDE title (1948–1993) ===
==== FIDE, Euwe and AVRO ====
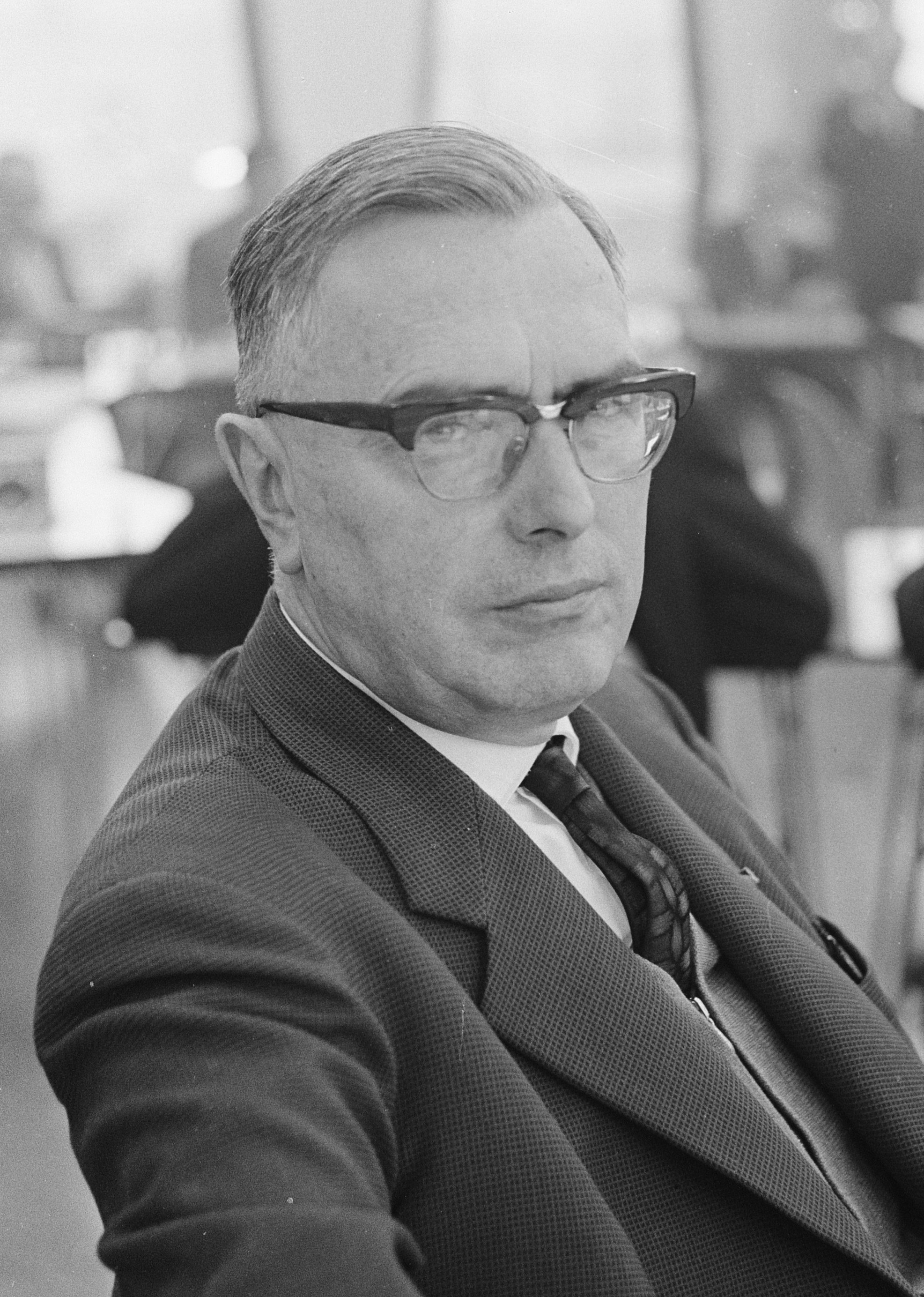
Max Euwe became the World Champion by defeating Alexander Alekhine in 1935 but lost a rematch in 1937.

Attempts to form an international chess federation were made at the time of the 1914 St. Petersburg, 1914 Mannheim and 1920 Gothenburg Tournaments. On 20 July 1924 the participants at the Paris tournament founded FIDE as a kind of players' union. FIDE's congresses in 1925 and 1926 expressed a desire to become involved in managing the world championship. FIDE was largely happy with the "London Rules", but claimed that the requirement for a purse of $10,000 was impracticable and called upon Capablanca to come to an agreement with the leading masters to revise the Rules. In 1926 FIDE decided in principle to create a title of "Champion of FIDE" and, in 1928, adopted the forthcoming 1928 Bogoljubow–Euwe match (won by Bogoljubow) as being for the "FIDE championship". Alekhine agreed to place future matches for the world title under the auspices of FIDE, except that he would only play Capablanca under the same conditions that governed their match in 1927. Although FIDE wished to set up a match between Alekhine and Bogoljubow, it made little progress and the title "Champion of FIDE" quietly vanished after Alekhine won the 1929 world championship match that he and Bogoljubow themselves arranged.

While negotiating his 1937 World Championship rematch with Alekhine, Euwe proposed that if he retained the title, FIDE should manage the nomination of future challengers and the conduct of championship matches. FIDE had been trying since 1935 to introduce rules on how to select challengers, and its various proposals favoured selection by some sort of committee. While they were debating procedures in 1937 and Alekhine and Euwe were preparing for their rematch later that year, the Royal Dutch Chess Federation proposed that a super-tournament (AVRO) of ex-champions and rising stars should be held to select the next challenger. FIDE rejected this proposal and at their second attempt nominated Salo Flohr as the official challenger. Euwe then declared that: if he retained his title against Alekhine he was prepared to meet Flohr in 1940 but he reserved the right to arrange a title match either in 1938 or 1939 with Capablanca, who had lost the title to Alekhine in 1927; if Euwe lost his title to Capablanca then FIDE's decision should be followed and Capablanca would have to play Flohr in 1940. Most chess writers and players strongly supported the Dutch super-tournament proposal and opposed the committee processes favoured by FIDE. While this confusion went unresolved: Euwe lost his title to Alekhine; the AVRO tournament in 1938 was won by Paul Keres under a tie-breaking rule, with Reuben Fine placed second and Capablanca and Flohr in the bottom places; and the outbreak of World War II in 1939 cut short the controversy.

==== Birth of FIDE's World Championship cycle (1946–1948) ====
Alexander Alekhine died in 1946 before anyone else could defeat him for the World Championship. This resulted in an interregnum that made the normal procedure impossible. The situation was very confused, with many respected players and commentators offering different solutions. FIDE found it very difficult to organise the early discussions on how to resolve the interregnum because problems with money and travel so soon after the end of World War II prevented many countries from sending representatives. The shortage of clear information resulted in otherwise responsible magazines publishing rumors and speculation, which only made the situation more confusing. It did not help that the Soviet Union had long refused to join FIDE, and by this time it was clear that about half the credible contenders were Soviet citizens. But, realizing that it could not afford to be excluded from discussions about the vacant world championship, the Soviet Union sent a telegram in 1947 apologizing for the absence of Soviet representatives and requesting that the USSR be represented on future FIDE Committees.

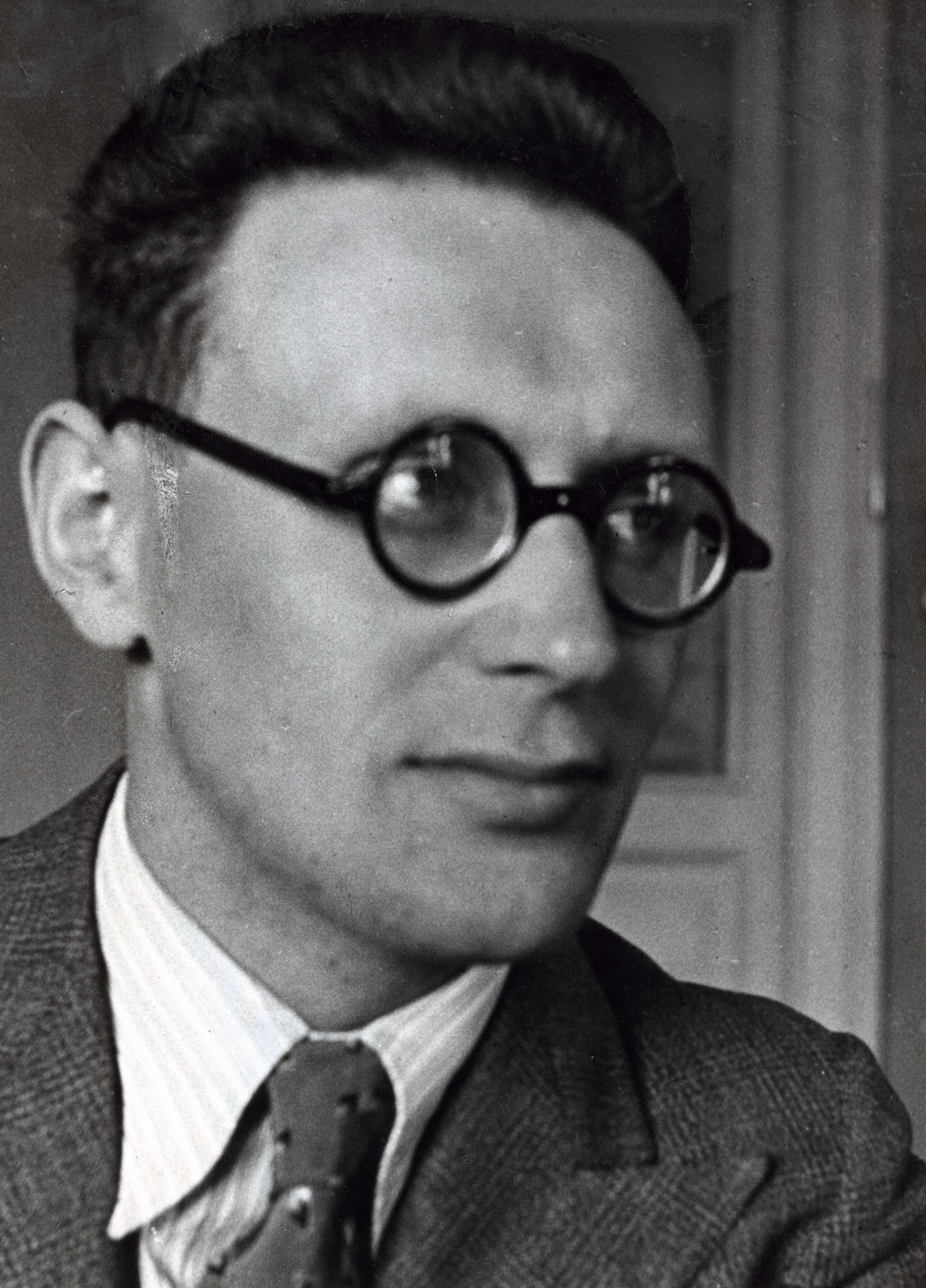
Mikhail Botvinnik was the first World Champion under FIDE jurisdiction.

The eventual solution was very similar to FIDE's initial proposal and to a proposal put forward by the Soviet Union (authored by Mikhail Botvinnik). The 1938 AVRO tournament was used as the basis for the 1948 Championship Tournament. The AVRO tournament had brought together the eight players who were, by general acclamation, the best players in the world at the time. Two of the participants at AVRO – Alekhine and former world champion José Raúl Capablanca – had died; but FIDE decided that the championship should be awarded to the winner of a round-robin tournament in which the other six participants at AVRO would play four games against each other. These players were: Max Euwe, from the Netherlands; Botvinnik, Paul Keres and Salo Flohr from the Soviet Union; and Reuben Fine and Samuel Reshevsky from the United States. However, FIDE soon accepted a Soviet request to substitute Vasily Smyslov for Flohr, and Fine dropped out in order to continue his degree studies in psychology, so only five players competed. Botvinnik won convincingly and thus became world champion, ending the interregnum.

The proposals which led to the 1948 Championship Tournament also specified the procedure by which challengers for the World Championship would be selected in a three-year cycle: countries affiliated to FIDE would send players to Zonal Tournaments (the number varied depending on how many good enough players each country had); the players who gained the top places in these would compete in an Interzonal Tournament (later split into two and then three tournaments as the number of countries and eligible players increased); the highest-placed players from the Interzonal would compete in the Candidates Tournament, along with whoever lost the previous title match and the second-placed competitor in the previous Candidates Tournament three years earlier; and the winner of the Candidates played a title match against the champion. Until 1962 inclusive the Candidates Tournament was a multi-cycle round-robin tournament – how and why it was changed are described below.

==== FIDE system (1949–1963) ====
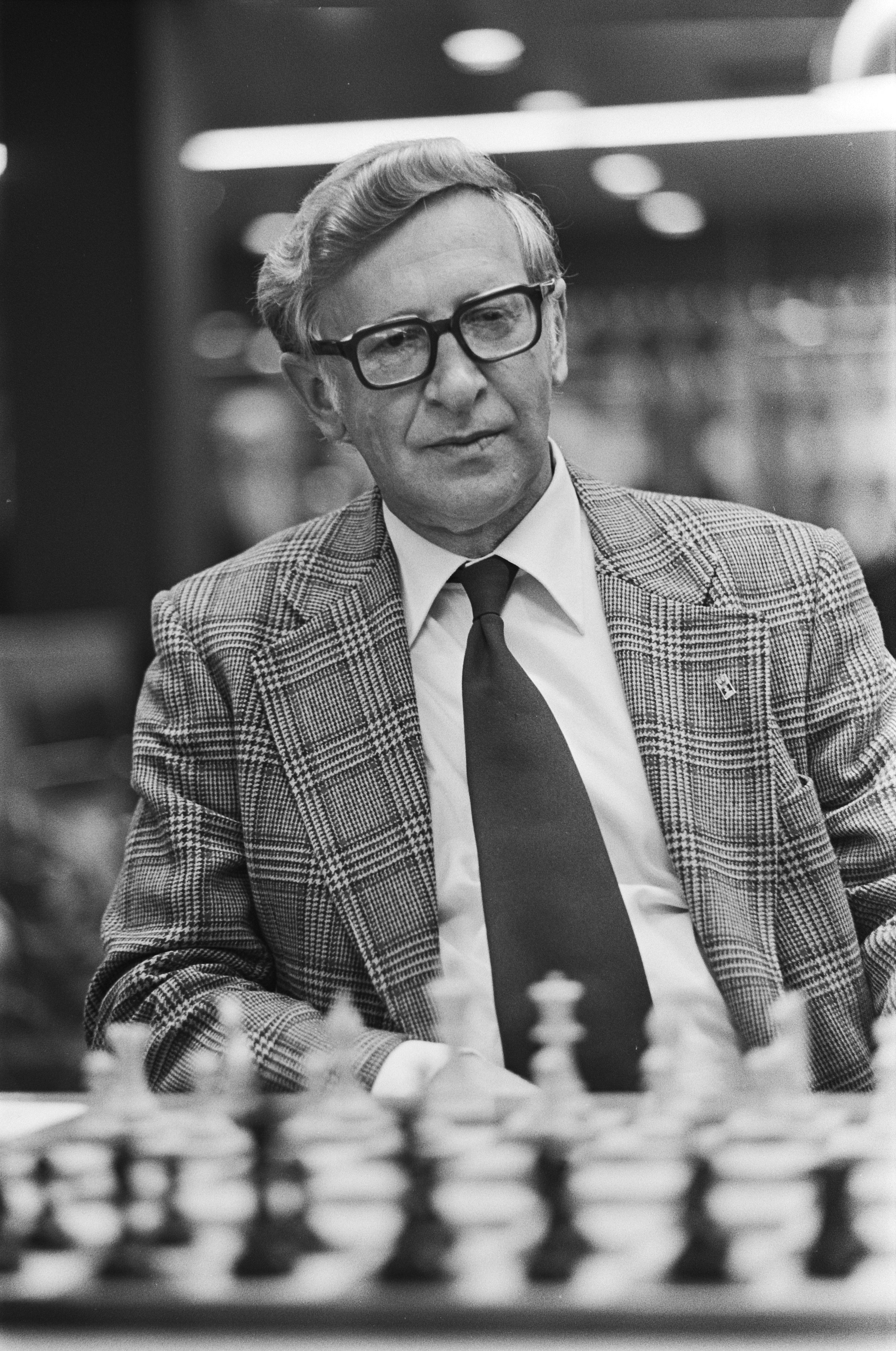
Vasily Smyslov (1957–1958)

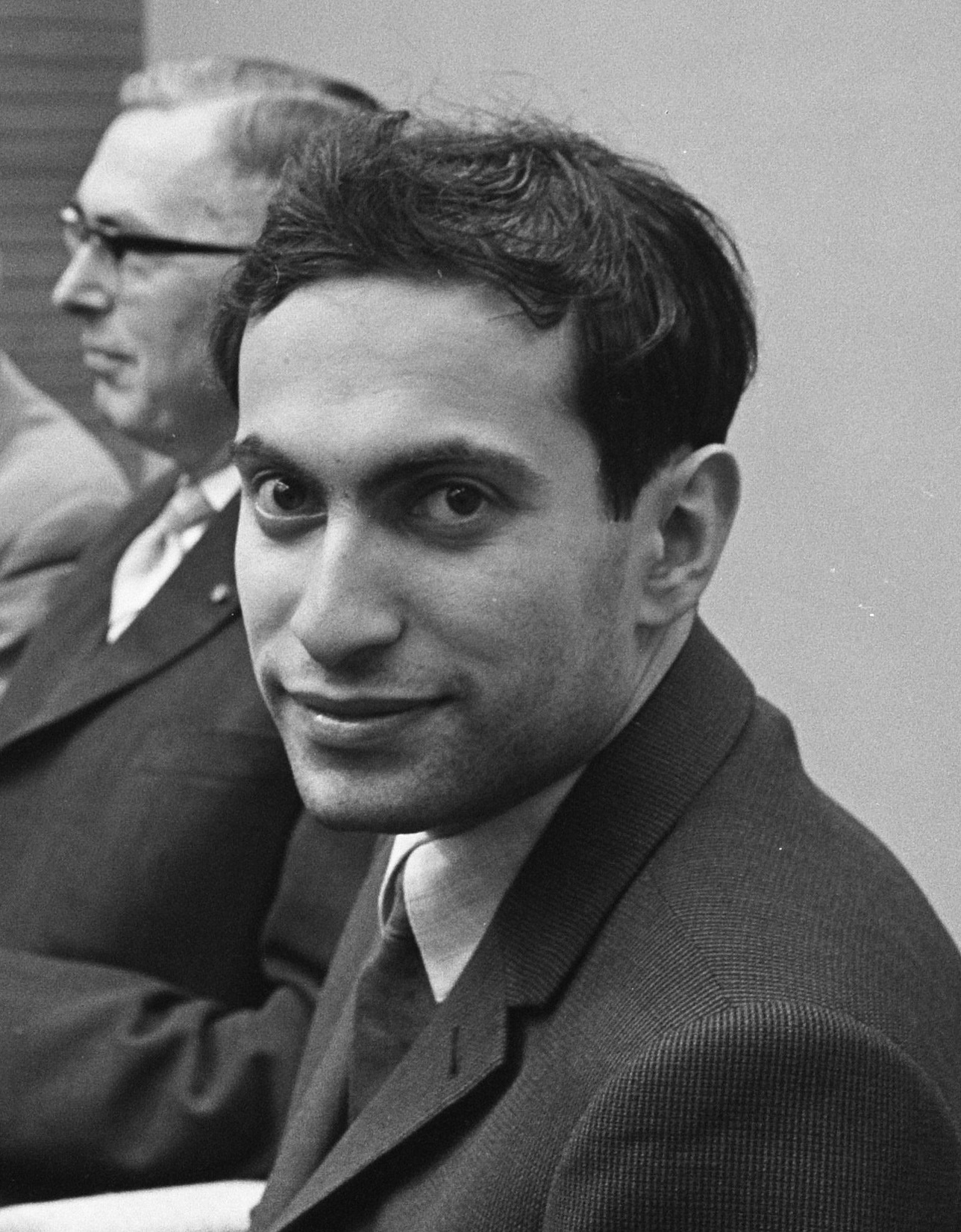
Mikhail Tal (1960–1961)

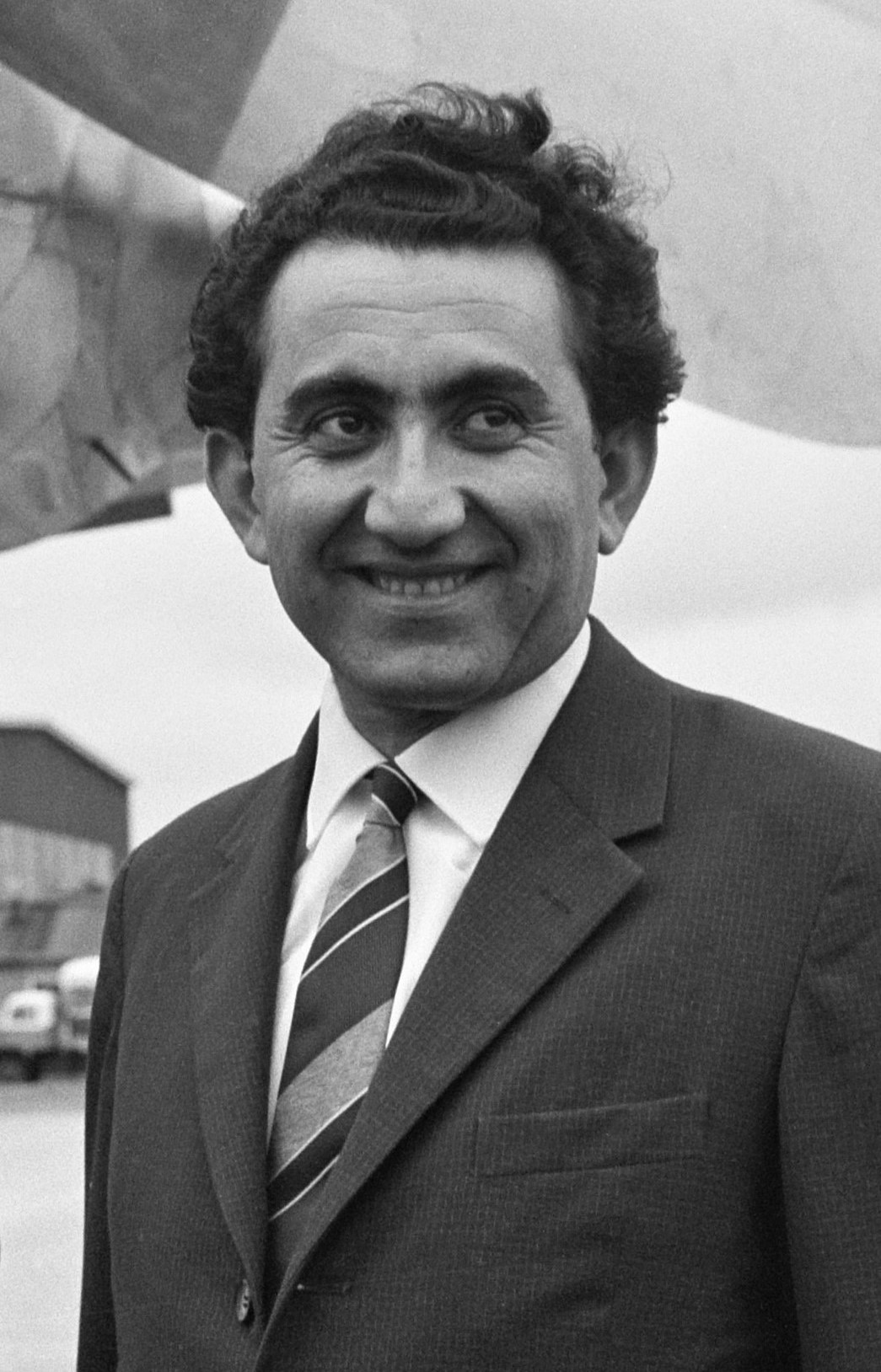
Tigran Petrosian (1963–1969)

The FIDE system followed its 1948 design through five cycles: 1948–1951, 1951–1954, 1954–1957, 1957–1960 and 1960–1963. The first two world championships under this system were drawn 12–12 – Botvinnik-Bronstein in 1951 and Botvinnik-Smyslov in 1954 – so Botvinnik retained the title both times. In 1956 FIDE introduced two apparently minor changes which Soviet grandmaster and chess official Yuri Averbakh alleged were instigated by the two Soviet representatives in FIDE, who were personal friends of reigning champion Mikhail Botvinnik. A defeated champion would have the right to a return match. FIDE also limited the number of players from the same country that could compete in the Candidates Tournament, on the grounds that it would reduce Soviet dominance of the tournament. Averbakh claimed that this was to Botvinnik's advantage as it reduced the number of Soviet players he might have to meet in the title match. Botvinnik lost to Vasily Smyslov in 1957 but won the return match in 1958, and lost to Mikhail Tal in 1960 but won the return match in 1961. Thus Smyslov and Tal each held the world title for a year, but Botvinnik was world champion for rest of the time from 1948 to 1963. The return match clause was not in place for the 1963 cycle. Tigran Petrosian won the 1962 Candidates and then defeated Botvinnik in 1963 to become world champion.

==== FIDE system (1963–1975) ====
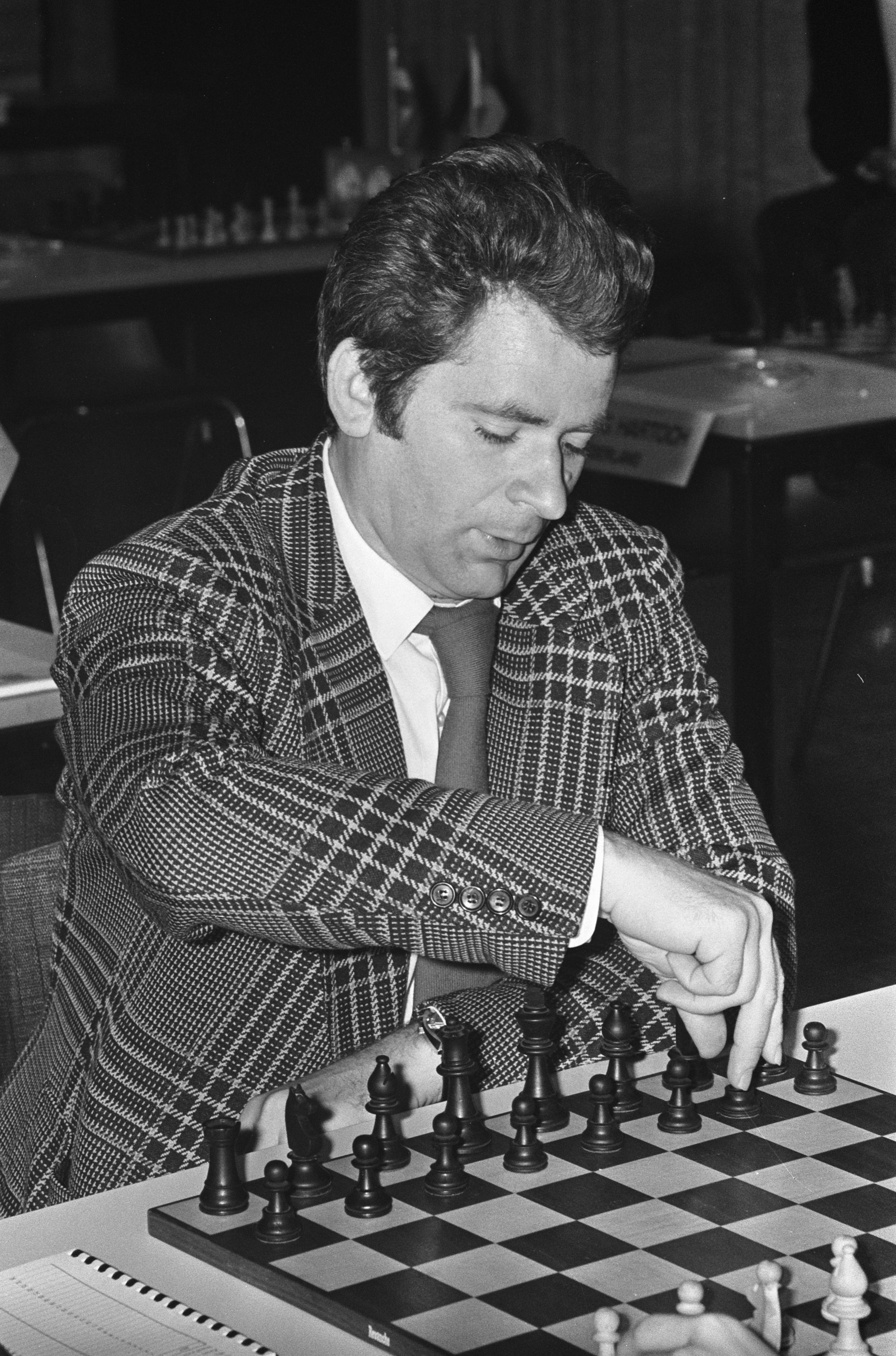
Boris Spassky won the World Championship in 1969, and defended his title against Fischer in 1972.

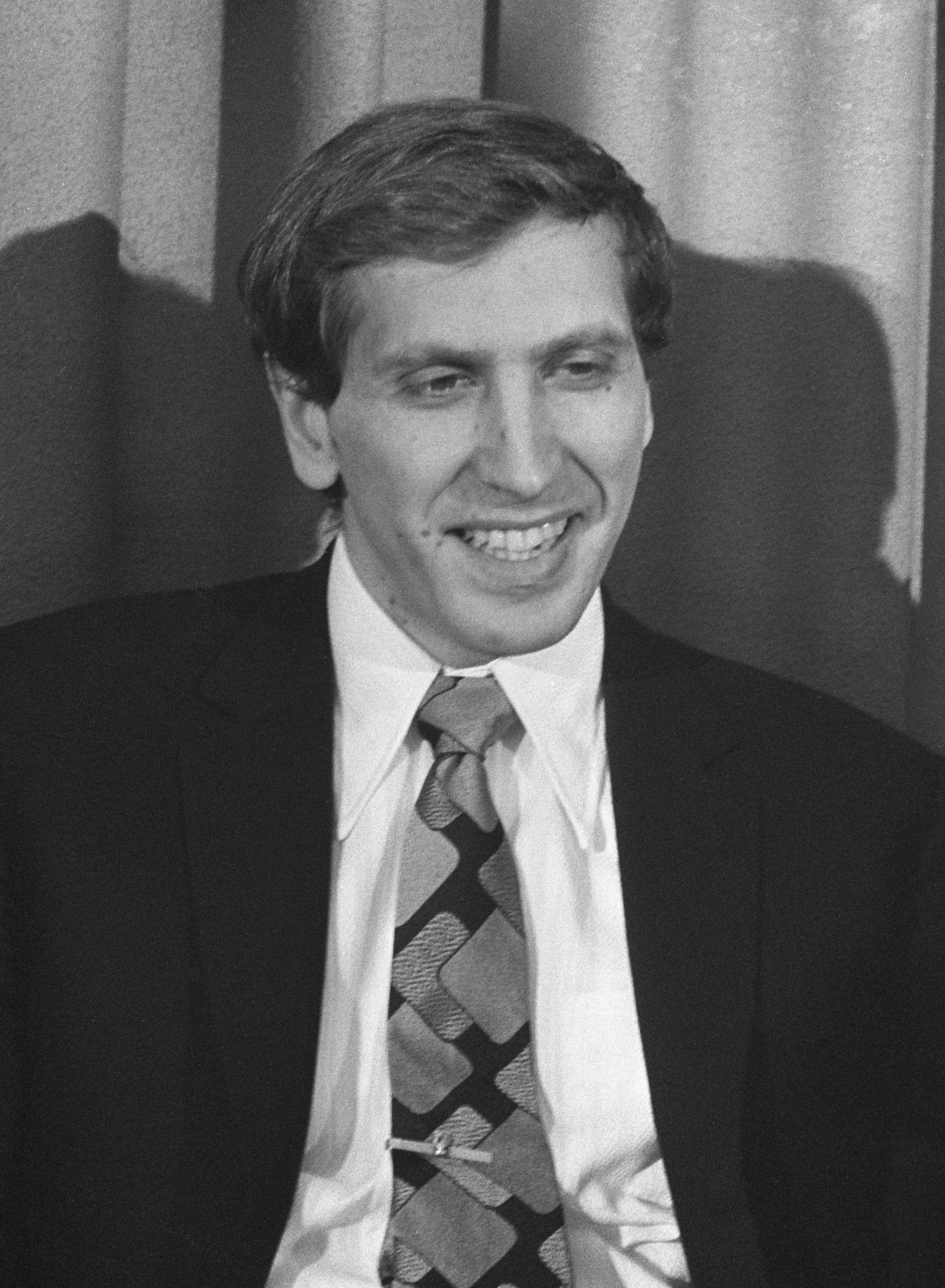
Bobby Fischer ended the 24 years of Soviet domination of the World Championship in 1972.

After the 1962 Candidates, Bobby Fischer publicly alleged that the Soviets had colluded to prevent any non-Soviet—specifically him—from winning. He claimed that Petrosian, Efim Geller and Paul Keres had prearranged to draw all their games, and that Viktor Korchnoi had been instructed to lose to them. Yuri Averbakh, who was head of the Soviet team, confirmed in 2002 that Petrosian, Geller and Keres arranged to draw all their games in order to save their energy for games against non-Soviet players. Korchnoi, who defected from the USSR in 1976, never confirmed that he was forced to throw games. FIDE responded by changing the format of future Candidates Tournaments to eliminate the possibility of collusion. Beginning in the next cycle, 1963–1966, the round-robin tournament was replaced by a series of elimination matches. Initially the quarter-finals and semi-finals were best of 10 games, and the final was best of 12. Fischer, however, refused to take part in the 1966 cycle, and dropped out of the 1969 cycle after a controversy at 1967 Interzonal in Sousse. Both these Candidates cycles were won by Boris Spassky, who lost the title match to Petrosian in 1966, but won and became world champion in 1969.

In the 1969–1972 cycle Fischer caused two more crises. He refused to play in the 1969 US Championship, which was a Zonal Tournament. This would have eliminated him from the 1969–1972 cycle, but Pal Benko was persuaded to concede his place in the Interzonal to Fischer. FIDE President Max Euwe accepted this maneuver and interpreted the rules very flexibly to enable Fischer to play, as he thought it important for the health and reputation of the game that Fischer should have the opportunity to challenge for the title as soon as possible. Fischer crushed all opposition and won the right to challenge reigning champion Boris Spassky. After agreeing to play in Yugoslavia, Fischer raised a series of objections and Iceland was the final venue. Even then Fischer raised difficulties, mainly over money. It took a phone call from United States Secretary of State Henry Kissinger and a doubling of the prize money by financier Jim Slater to persuade him to play. After a few more traumatic moments Fischer won the match 12½–8½.

An unbroken line of FIDE champions had thus been established from 1948 to 1972, with each champion gaining his title by beating the previous incumbent. This came to an end when Anatoly Karpov won the right to challenge Fischer in 1975. Fischer objected to the "best of 24 games" championship match format that had been used from 1951 onwards, claiming that it would encourage whoever got an early lead to play for draws. Instead he demanded that the match should be won by whoever first won 10 games, except that if the score reached 9–9 he should remain champion. He argued that this was more advantageous to the challenger than the champion's advantage under the existing system, where the champion retained the title if the match was tied at 12–12 including draws. Eventually FIDE deposed Fischer and crowned Karpov as the new champion. Fischer privately maintained that he was still World Champion. He went into seclusion and did not play chess in public again until 1992, when Spassky agreed to participate in an unofficial rematch for the World Championship. Fischer won the 1992 Fischer–Spassky rematch decisively with a score of 10–5.

==== Karpov and Kasparov (1975–1993) ====
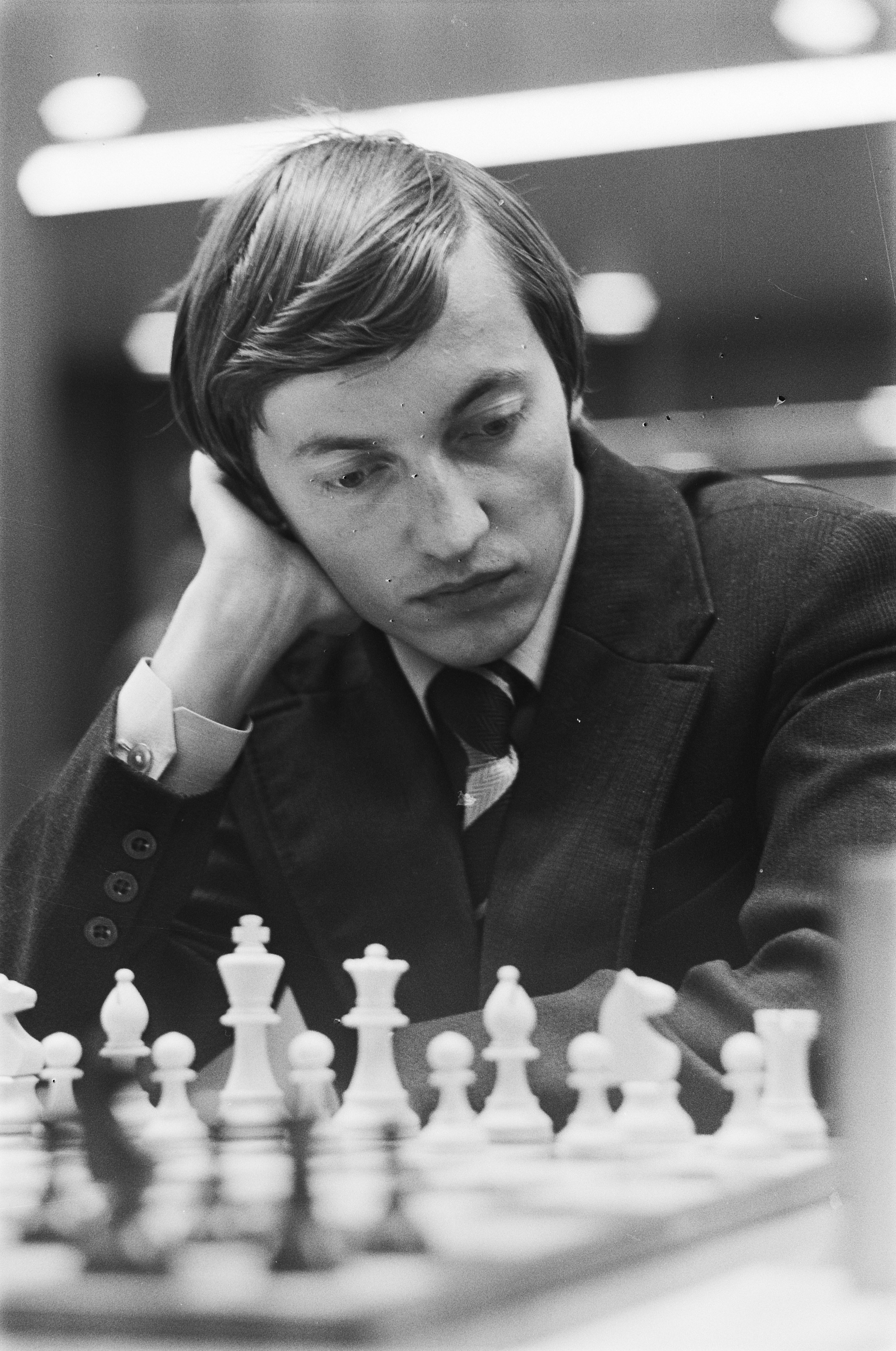
Anatoly Karpov became World Champion after Fischer refused to defend his title in 1975 and held the title till 1985. He was the FIDE World Champion from 1993 to 1999 when the world title was split.

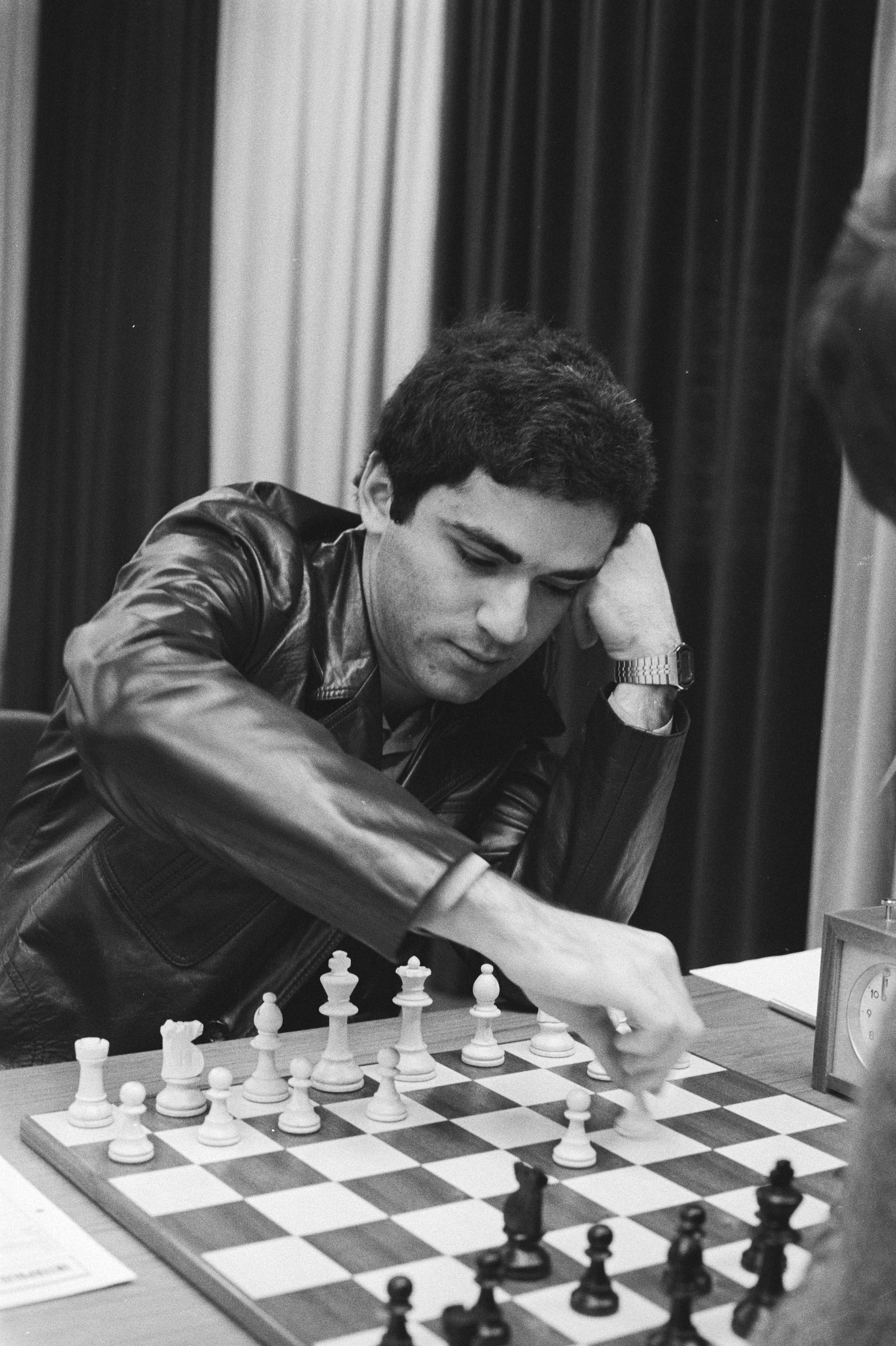
Garry Kasparov defeated Karpov to become the 13th World Champion, and was the undisputed World Champion from 1985 to 1993. He held the split title until 2000.

After becoming world champion by default, Karpov confirmed his worthiness for the title with a string of tournament successes from the mid 70s to the early 80s. He defended his title twice against ex-Soviet Viktor Korchnoi, first in Baguio in 1978 (6–5 with 21 draws) and in Merano in 1981 (6–2, with 10 draws). In the 1984 World Chess Championship, Karpov played against Garry Kasparov. Karpov retained the title after the tournament went for more than five months and was terminated with Karpov leading with five wins to Kasparov's three and 40 draws after 48 games.

Karpov eventually lost his title in 1985 to Kasparov, who won the title by a scoreline of 13–11. The two played three more subsequent championships in 1986 (won by Kasparov, 12½–11½), 1987 (drawn 12–12, Kasparov retained the title) and 1990 (won by Kasparov, 12½–11½). In the five matches, Kasparov and Karpov played a total of 144 World Championship games with 104 draws, 21 wins by Kasparov and 19 wins by Karpov.

=== Split title (1993–2006) ===
In 1993, Nigel Short broke the domination of Kasparov and Karpov by defeating Karpov in the candidates semi-finals followed by Jan Timman in the finals, thereby earning the right to challenge Kasparov for the title. Before the match took place, however, both Kasparov and Short complained of FIDE's mishandling of the prize pool in organising the match, corruption in the leadership, and FIDE's failure to abide by their own rules, and split from FIDE to set up the Professional Chess Association (PCA), under whose auspices they held their match. In response, FIDE stripped Kasparov of his title and held a championship match between Karpov and Timman. For the first time in history, there were two World Chess Champions: Kasparov defeated Short and Karpov beat Timman.

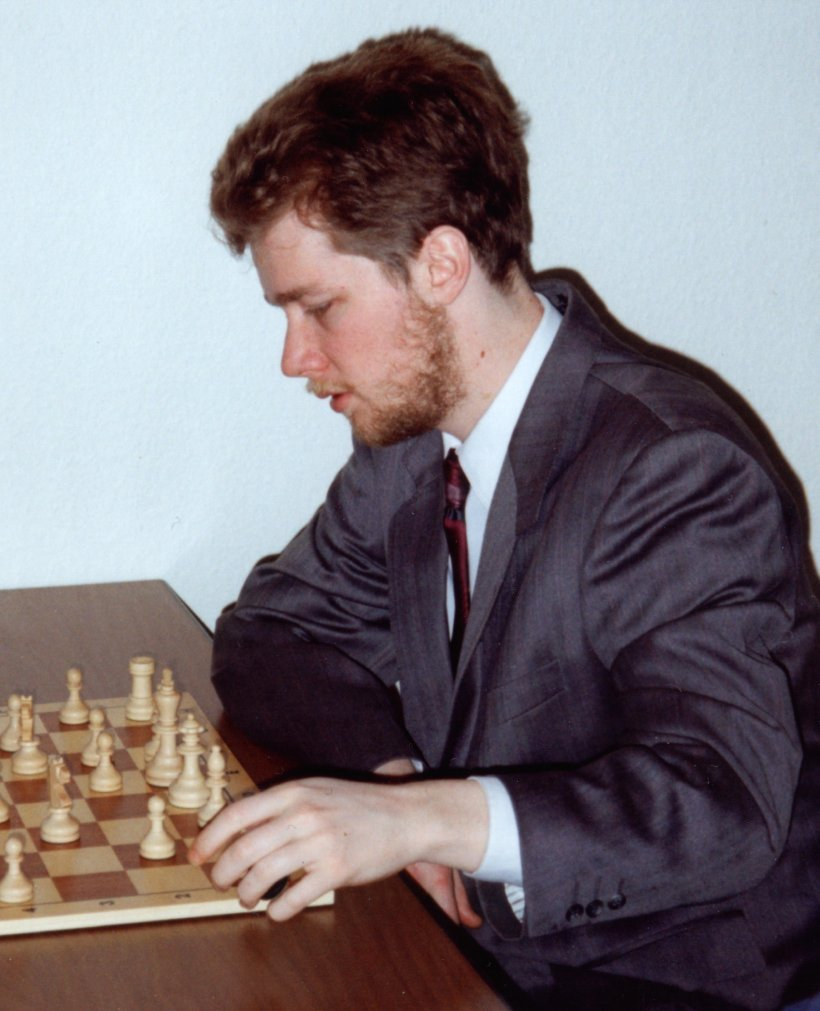
Alexander Khalifman, FIDE World Champion 1999–2000

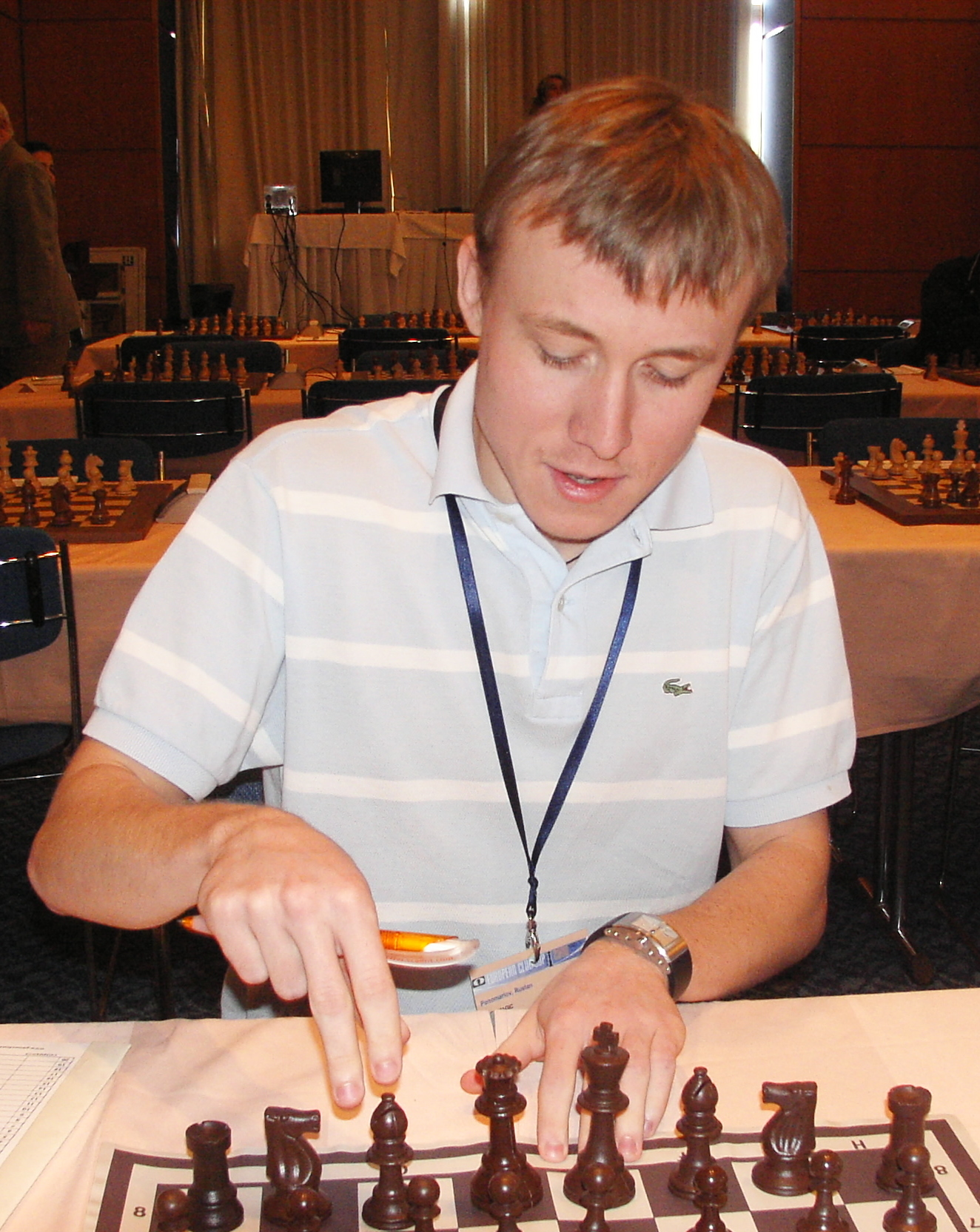
Ruslan Ponomariov, FIDE World Champion 2002–2004

FIDE and the PCA each held a championship cycle in 1993–1996, with many of the same challengers playing in both. Kasparov and Karpov both won their respective cycles. In the PCA cycle, Kasparov defeated Viswanathan Anand in the PCA World Chess Championship 1995. Karpov defeated Gata Kamsky in the final of the FIDE World Chess Championship 1996. Negotiations were held for a reunification match between Kasparov and Karpov in 1996–97, but nothing came of them.

Soon after the 1995 championship, the PCA folded, and Kasparov had no organisation to choose his next challenger. In 1998 he formed the World Chess Council, which organised a candidates match between Alexei Shirov and Vladimir Kramnik. Shirov won the match, but negotiations for a Kasparov–Shirov match broke down, and Shirov was subsequently omitted from negotiations, much to his disgust. Plans for a 1999 or 2000 Kasparov–Anand match also broke down, and Kasparov organised a match with Kramnik in late 2000. In a major upset, Kramnik won the match with two wins, thirteen draws and no losses. At the time the championship was called the Braingames World Chess Championship, but Kramnik later referred to himself as the Classical World Chess Champion.

Meanwhile, FIDE had decided to scrap the Interzonal and Candidates system, instead having a large knockout event in which a large number of players contested short matches against each other over just a few weeks (see FIDE World Chess Championship 1998). Rapid and blitz games were used to resolve ties at the end of each round, a format which some felt did not necessarily recognise the highest-quality play: Kasparov refused to participate in these events, as did Kramnik after he won the Classical title in 2000. In the first of these events, in 1998, champion Karpov was seeded directly into the final, but he later had to qualify alongside the other players. Karpov defended his title in the first of these championships in 1998, but resigned his title in protest at the new rules in 1999. Alexander Khalifman won the FIDE World Championship in 1999, Anand in 2000, Ruslan Ponomariov in 2002 and Rustam Kasimdzhanov in 2004.

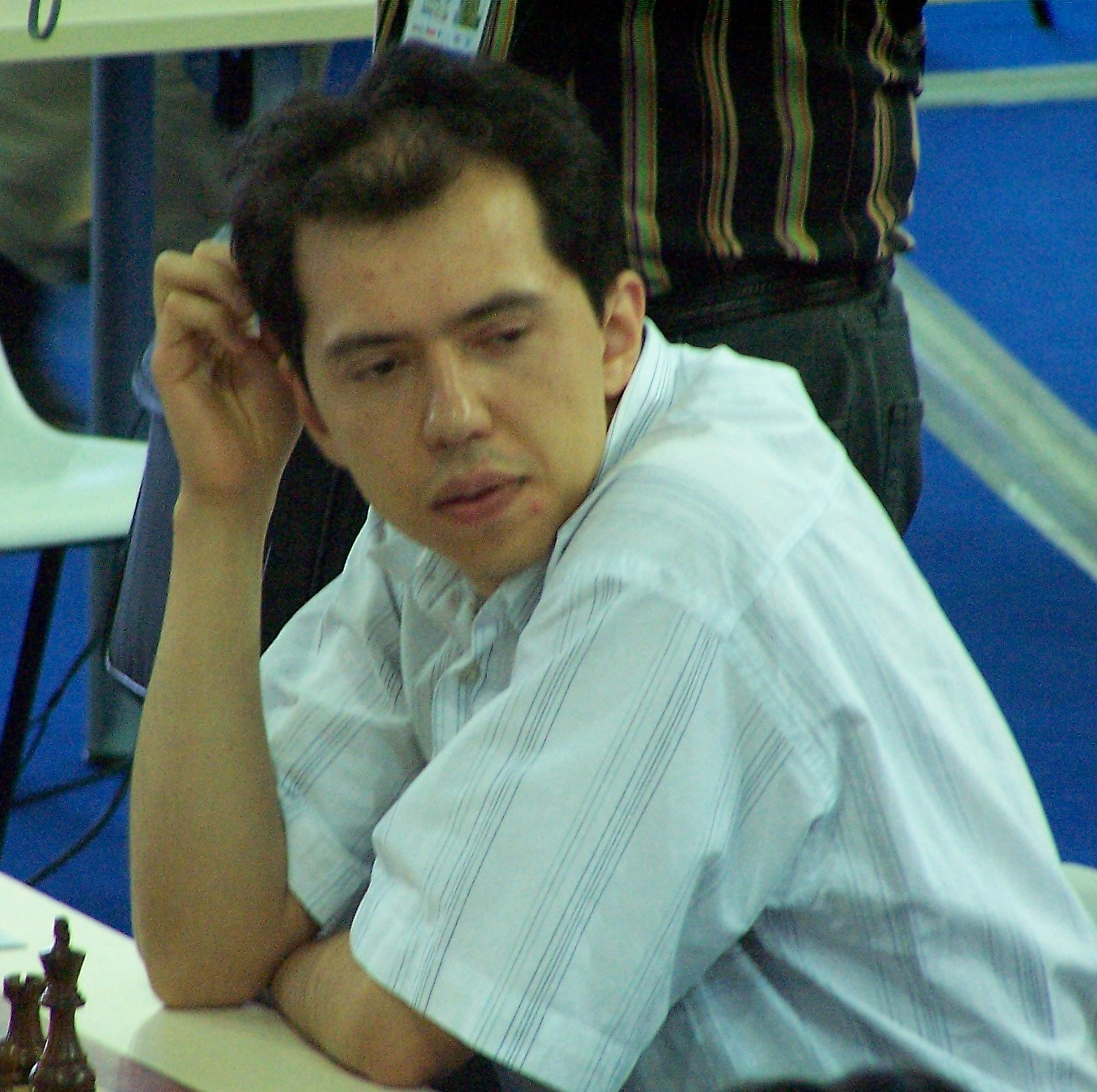
Rustam Kasimdzhanov, FIDE World Champion 2004–2005

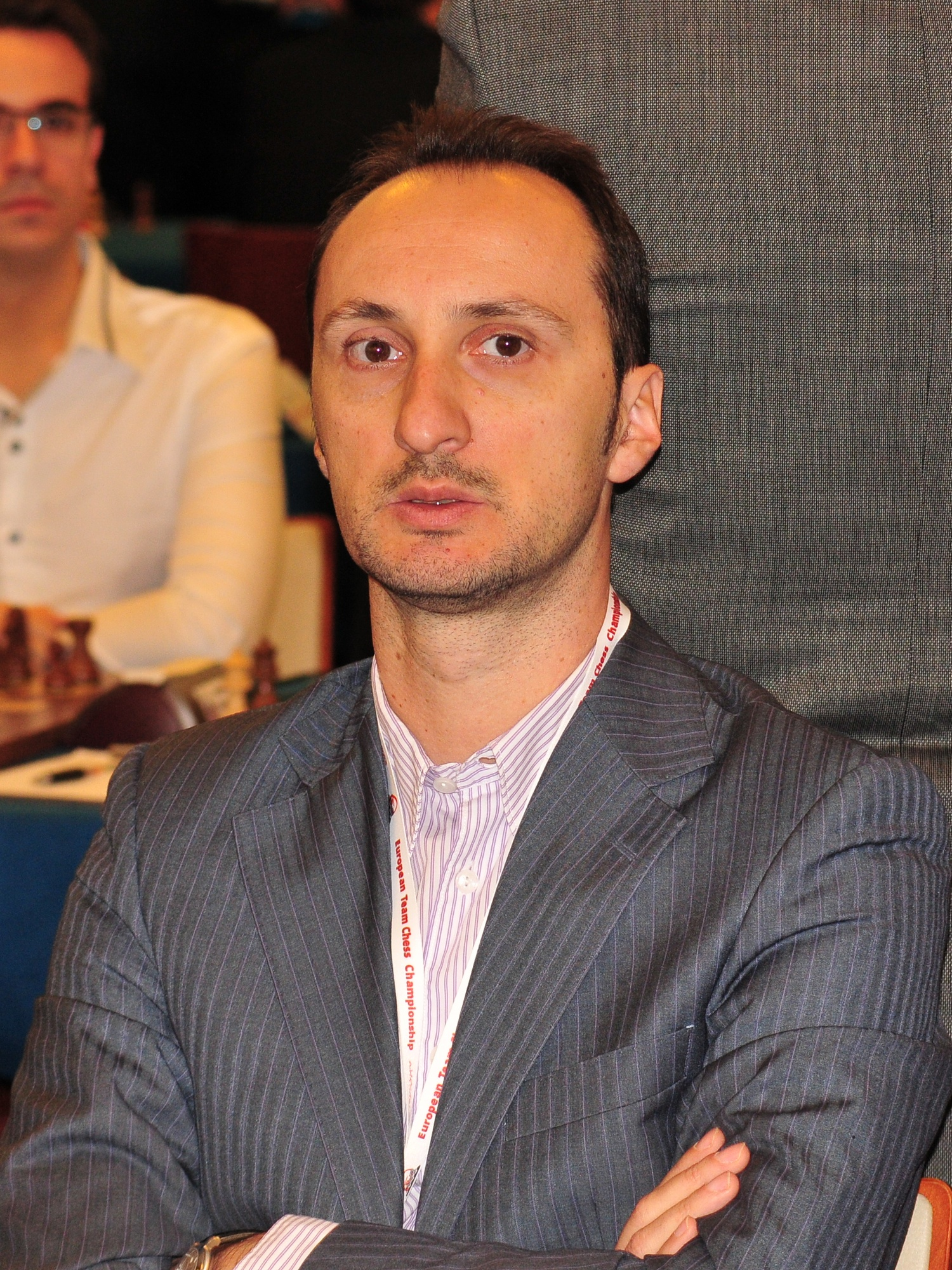
Veselin Topalov, FIDE World Champion 2005–2006

By 2002, not only were there two rival champions, but Kasparov's strong results – he had the top Elo rating in the world and had won a string of major tournaments after losing his title in 2000 – ensured even more confusion over who was World Champion. In May 2002, American grandmaster Yasser Seirawan led the organisation of the so-called "Prague Agreement" to reunite the world championship. Kramnik had organised a candidates tournament (won later in 2002 by Peter Leko) to choose his challenger. It was agreed that Kasparov would play the FIDE champion (Ponomariov) for the FIDE title, and the winner of that match would face the winner of the Kramnik–Leko match for the unified title. The matches, however, proved difficult to finance and organise. The Kramnik–Leko match did not take place until late 2004 (it was drawn, so Kramnik retained his title).

Meanwhile, FIDE never managed to organise a Kasparov match, either with 2002 FIDE champion Ponomariov, or 2004 FIDE champion Kasimdzhanov. Kasparov's frustration at the situation played a part in his decision to retire from chess in 2005, still ranked No. 1 in the world. Soon after, FIDE dropped the short knockout format for a World Championship and announced the FIDE World Chess Championship 2005, a double round robin tournament to be held in San Luis, Argentina between eight of the leading players in the world. However Kramnik insisted that his title be decided in a match, and declined to participate. The tournament was convincingly won by the Bulgarian Veselin Topalov, and negotiations began for a Kramnik–Topalov match to unify the title.

=== Reunified title (since 2006) ===
==== Kramnik (2006–2007) ====
The World Chess Championship 2006 reunification match between Topalov and Kramnik was held in late 2006. After much controversy, it was won by Kramnik. Kramnik thus became the first unified and undisputed World Chess Champion since Kasparov split from FIDE to form the PCA in 1993. This match, along with all subsequent world championships, was administered by FIDE.

==== Anand (2007–2013) ====
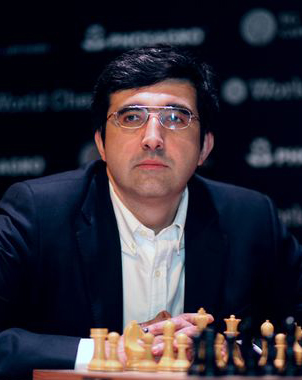
Vladimir Kramnik defeated Kasparov in 2000, and became the undisputed world champion by beating Topalov in 2006.

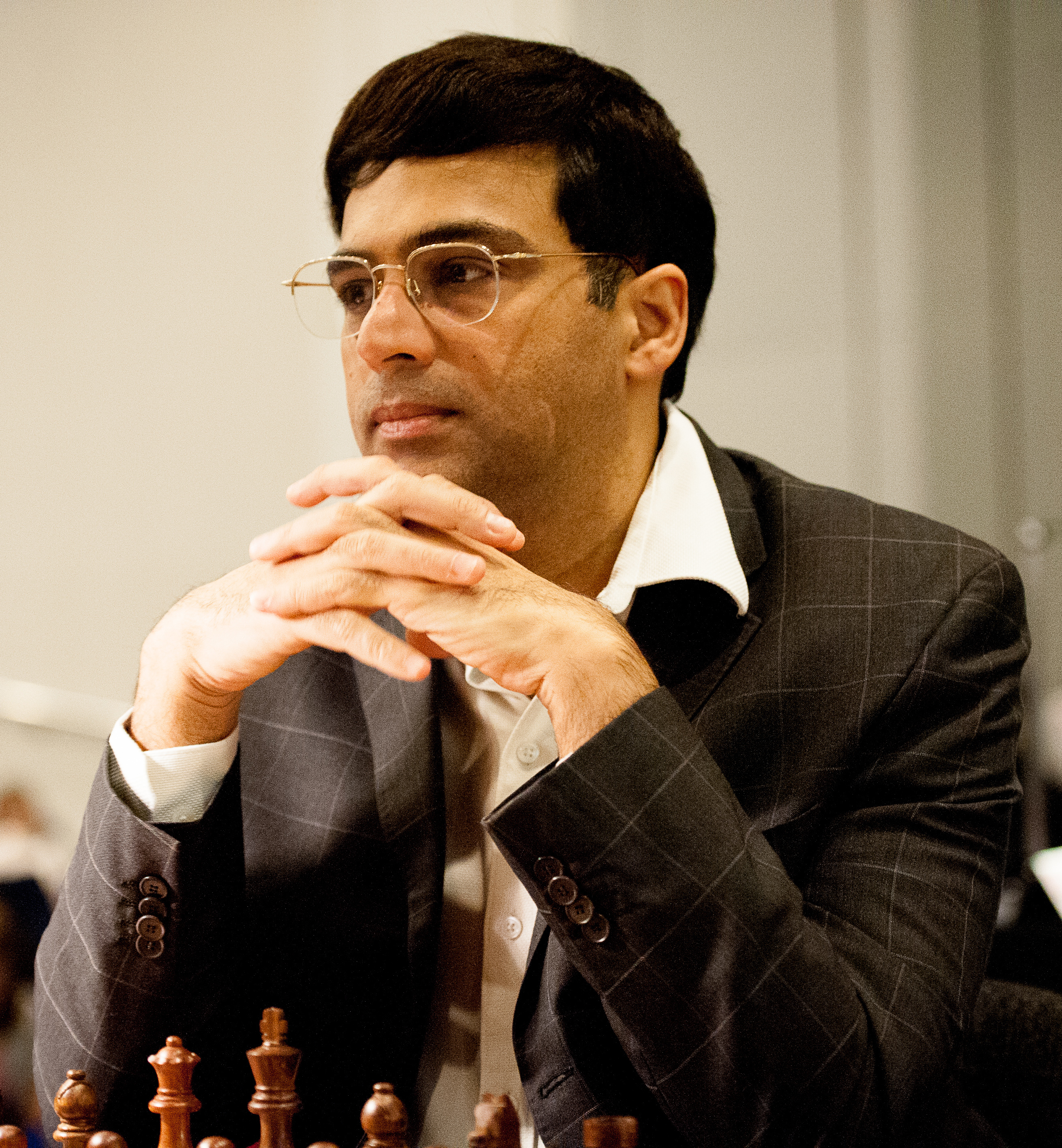
Viswanathan Anand, who held the FIDE title from 2000 to 2002, won the unified title in 2007 after defeating Kramnik and was the undisputed Champion till 2013.

Kramnik played to defend his title at the World Chess Championship 2007 in Mexico. This was an 8-player double round robin tournament, the same format as was used for the FIDE World Chess Championship 2005. This tournament was won by Viswanathan Anand, thus making him the World Chess Champion. Because Anand's World Chess Champion title was won in a tournament rather than a match, a minority of commentators questioned the validity of his title. Kramnik also made ambiguous comments about the value of Anand's title, but did not claim the title himself then. (In a 2015 interview Kramnik dated the loss of his world championship title to his 2008 match against Anand rather than the 2007 tournament, and he likewise did not contradict an interviewer who dated it thus in a 2019 interview.) Subsequent world championship matches returned to the format of a match between the champion and a challenger.

The following two championships had special clauses arising from the 2006 unification. Kramnik was given the right to challenge for the title he lost in a tournament in the World Chess Championship 2008, which Anand won. Then Topalov, who as the loser of the 2006 match was excluded from the 2007 championship, was seeded directly into the Candidates final of the World Chess Championship 2010. He won the Candidates (against Gata Kamsky) to set up a match against Anand, who again won the championship match. The next championship, the World Chess Championship 2012, had short knock-out matches for the Candidates Tournament. This format was not popular with everyone, and Magnus Carlsen withdrew in protest. Boris Gelfand won the Candidates. Anand won the championship match again, in tie breaking rapid games, for his fourth consecutive world championship win.

==== Carlsen (2013–2023) ====
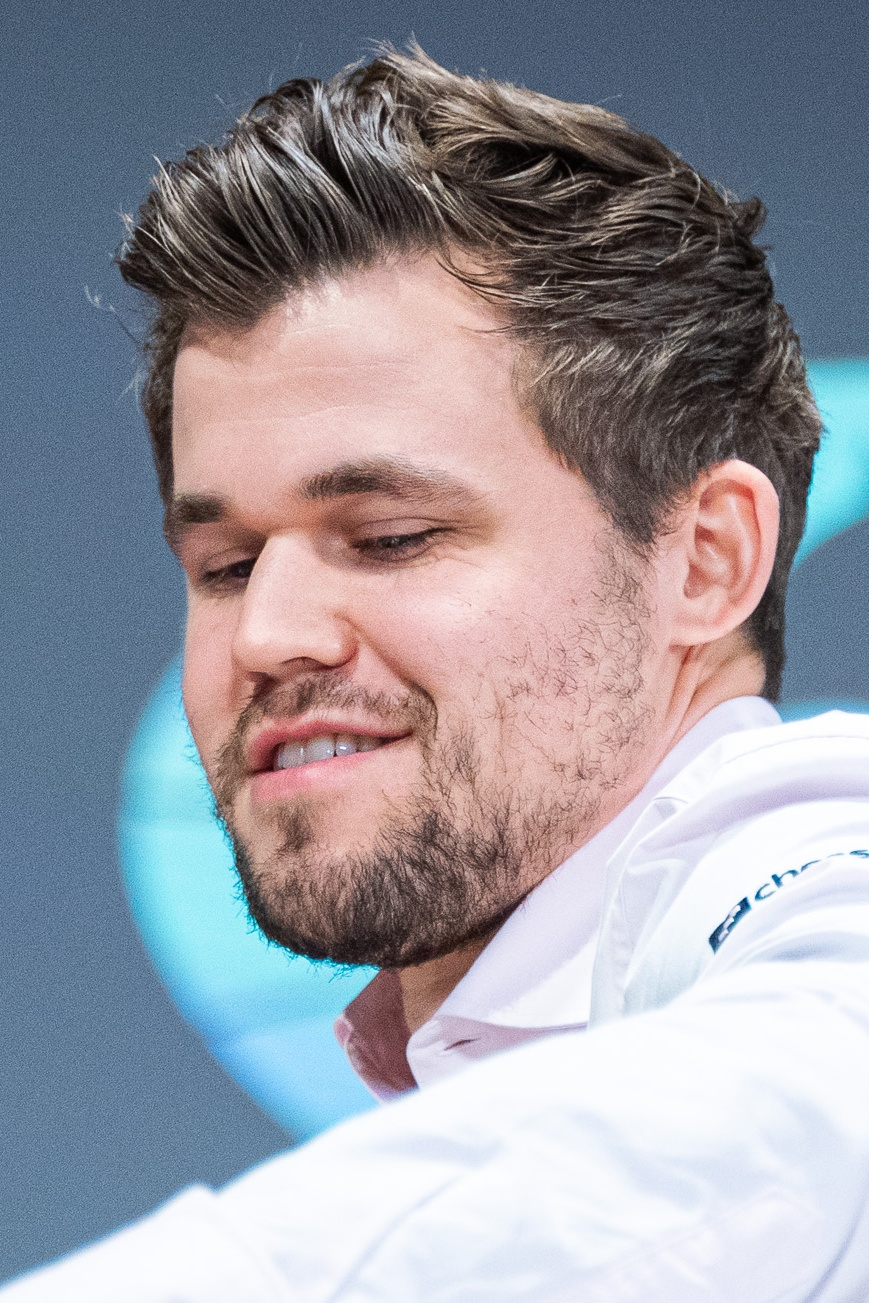
Magnus Carlsen became the World Champion after defeating Anand in 2013. He defended his title in four tournaments and was the Champion until 2023.

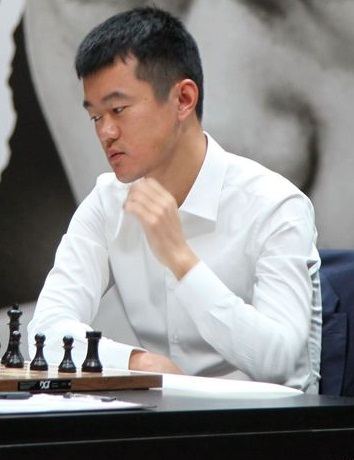
Ding Liren became the World Champion in 2023 after defeating Ian Nepomniachtchi as Carlsen refused to defend his title. He was the reigning champion until 2024.

Since 2013, the Candidates Tournament has been an eight-player double round robin tournament, with the winner playing a match against the champion for the title. Norwegian Magnus Carlsen won the 2013 Candidates and then convincingly defeated Anand in the World Chess Championship 2013.

Beginning with the 2014 Championship cycle, the World Championship has followed a 2-year cycle: qualification for the Candidates in the odd year, the Candidates tournament early in the even year, and the World Championship match later in the even year. This and the next two cycles resulted in Carlsen successfully defending his title: against Anand in 2014; against Sergey Karjakin in 2016; and against Fabiano Caruana in 2018. Both the 2016 and 2018 defences were decided by tie-break in rapid games.

The COVID-19 pandemic disrupted the 2020 Candidates Tournament, and caused the next match to be postponed from 2020 to 2021. Carlsen again successfully defended his title, defeating Ian Nepomniachtchi in the World Chess Championship 2021.

==== Ding (2023–2024) ====
Soon after the 2021 match, Carlsen indicated that he would not defend the title again. This was confirmed in an announcement by FIDE on 20 July 2022. As a consequence, the top two finishers of the Candidates Tournament, Ian Nepomniachtchi and Ding Liren, played in the 2023 championship in Astana, Kazakhstan, from 7 April to 30 April 2023. Ding won in rapid tiebreaks, making him the first World Chess Champion from China. FIDE referred to Ding as the "17th World Champion"; thus the "Classical" line of Champions during the split has been de facto legitimised over the FIDE line by FIDE itself.

==== Gukesh (2024–present) ====
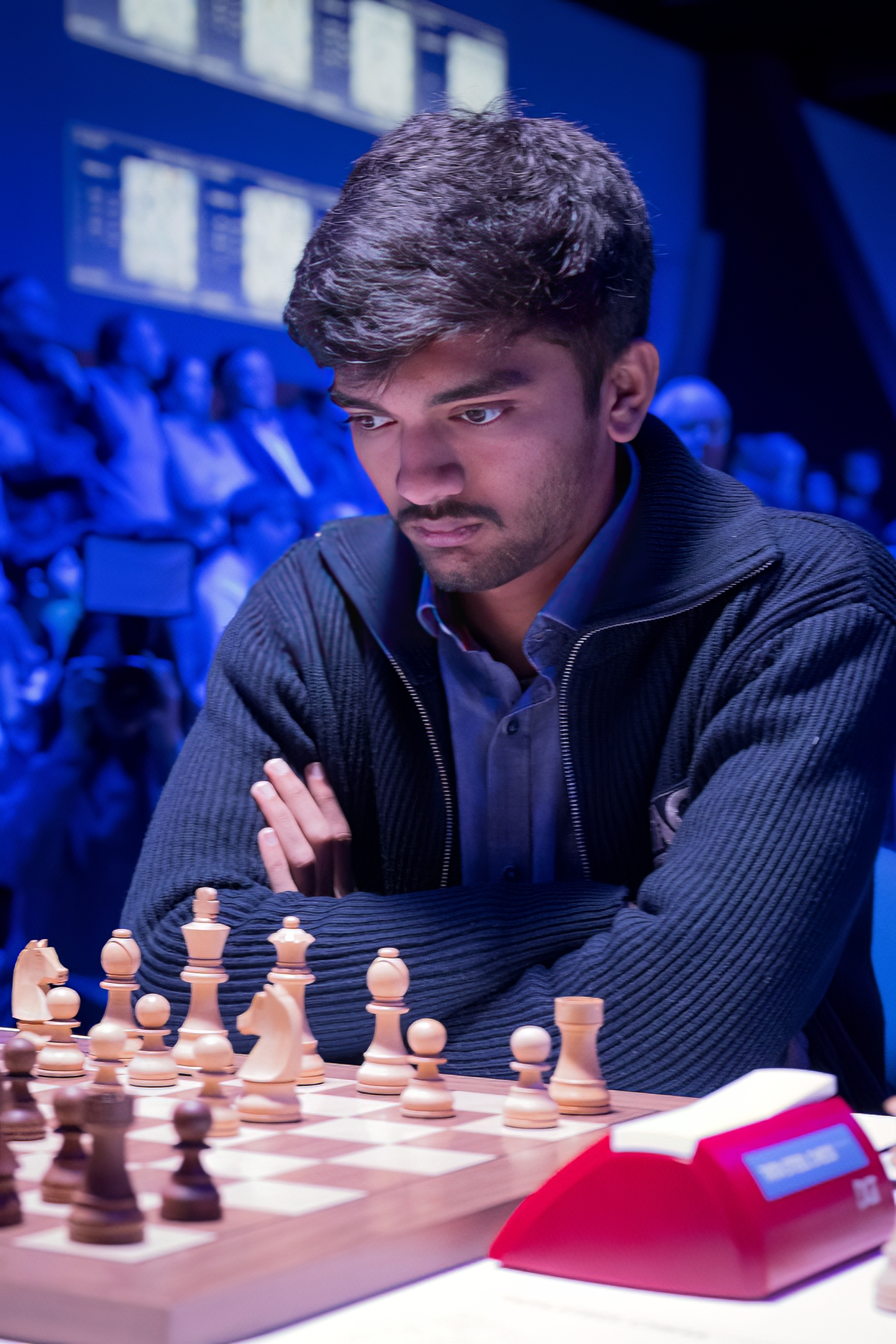
Gukesh Dommaraju became the World Champion in 2024 after defeating Ding Liren.

2024 saw a return to the pre-COVID timetable, with the Candidates tournament played in early 2024, and the championship match in late 2024, from 25 November to 12 December in Singapore. Gukesh Dommaraju was the surprise winner of the Candidates, then defeated Ding Liren in the championship match, by 7½ to 6½. At 18 years old, Gukesh became the youngest undisputed World Chess Champion.

Gukesh is currently set to defend his title in the 2026 World Chess Championship, where he will face Javokhir Sindarov in Geneva, Switzerland.

== Format ==
Until 1948, world championship contests were arranged privately between the players. As a result, the players also had to arrange the funding, in the form of stakes provided by enthusiasts who wished to bet on one of the players. In the early 20th century this was sometimes an obstacle that prevented or delayed challenges for the title. Between 1888 and 1948 various difficulties that arose in match negotiations led players to try to define agreed rules for matches, including the frequency of matches, how much or how little say the champion had in the conditions for a title match and what the stakes and division of the purse should be. However these attempts were unsuccessful in practice, as the same issues continued to delay or prevent challenges. There was an attempt by an external organisation to manage the world championship from 1887 to 1889, but this experiment was not repeated until 1948.

After the death of world champion Alexander Alekhine in 1946, the World Chess Championship 1948 was a one-off tournament to decide a new world champion.

Since 1948, the world championship has mainly operated on a two or three-year cycle, with four stages:

1. Zonal tournaments: different regional tournaments to qualify for the following stage. Qualifiers from zonals play in the Interzonal (up to 1993), knockout world championship (1998 to 2004) or Chess World Cup (since 2005).
2. Candidates qualification tournaments. From 1948 to 1993, the only such tournament was the Interzonal. Since 2005, the Interzonal has mainly been replaced by the Chess World Cup. However extra qualification events have also been added: the FIDE Grand Prix, a series of tournaments restricted to the top 20 or so players in the world; and the Grand Swiss tournament. Since 2023, the Grand Prix has been replaced by the FIDE Circuit, making many more tournaments (besides those organised by FIDE) contribute towards Candidates qualification. In addition, a small number of players sometimes qualify directly for the Candidates either by finishing highly in the previous cycle, on rating, or as a wild card.
3. The Candidates Tournament is a tournament to choose the challenger. Over the years it has varied in size (between 8 and 16 players) and in format (a tournament, a set of matches, or a combination of the two). Since the 2013 cycle it has always been an eight-player, double round-robin tournament.
4. The championship match between the champion and the challenger.

There have been a few exceptions to this system:

- Before 1963, and from 1978 until at least 1986, there was a rematch clause, allowing the defeated champion a rematch. The 1958, 1961 and 1986 matches were held under these conditions. There was also a one-off rematch in 2008 as a result of clauses agreed to in the World Chess Championship 2006.
- The 1975 world championship was not held, as the champion (Fischer) refused to defend his title. The winner of the Candidates tournament (Karpov) became champion by default.
- There were many variations during the world title split between 1993 and 2006. FIDE determined the championship by a single knockout tournament between 1998 and 2004, and by an eight-player tournament in 2005; meanwhile, the Classical world championship had no qualifying stages in 2000, and only a Candidates tournament in its 2004 cycle.
- A one-off match to reunite the world championship was held in 2006.
- The 2007 world championship was determined by an eight-player tournament instead of a match.
- The 2023 world championship was played between the top two finishers of the Candidates, as the champion (Carlsen) refused to defend his title.

== World champions ==
=== Pre-FIDE world champions (1886–1946) ===
#	Name	Country	Years
1	Wilhelm Steinitz	United States	1886–1894
2	Emanuel Lasker	Germany; German Republic	1894–1921
3	José Raúl Capablanca	Cuba	1921–1927
4	Alexander Alekhine	France	1927–1935
5	Max Euwe	Netherlands	1935–1937
(4)	Alexander Alekhine	France	1937–1946
Interregnum

=== FIDE world champions (1948–1993) ===
#	Name	Country	Years
6	Mikhail Botvinnik	Soviet Union	1948–1957
7	Vasily Smyslov	Soviet Union	1957–1958
(6)	Mikhail Botvinnik	Soviet Union	1958–1960
8	Mikhail Tal	Soviet Union	1960–1961
(6)	Mikhail Botvinnik	Soviet Union	1961–1963
9	Tigran Petrosian	Soviet Union	1963–1969
10	Boris Spassky	Soviet Union	1969–1972
11	Bobby Fischer	United States	1972–1975
12	Anatoly Karpov	Soviet Union	1975–1985
13	Garry Kasparov	Soviet Union	1985–1993
13	Garry Kasparov	Russia	1985–1993

=== Classical (PCA/Braingames) world champions (1993–2006) ===
#	Name	Country	Years
13	Garry Kasparov	Russia	1993–2000
14	Vladimir Kramnik	Russia	2000–2006

=== FIDE world champions (1993–2006) ===
Name	Country	Years
Anatoly Karpov	Russia	1993–1999
Alexander Khalifman	Russia	1999–2000
Viswanathan Anand	India	2000–2002
Ruslan Ponomariov	Ukraine	2002–2004
Rustam Kasimdzhanov	Uzbekistan	2004–2005
Veselin Topalov	Bulgaria	2005–2006

=== FIDE (reunified) world champions (2006–present) ===
#	Name	Country	Years
14	Vladimir Kramnik	Russia	2006–2007
15	Viswanathan Anand	India	2007–2013
16	Magnus Carlsen	Norway	2013–2023
17	Ding Liren	China	2023–2024
18	Gukesh Dommaraju	India	2024–present

=== World Champions by number of title match victories ===
The table below organises the world champions in order of championship wins. A successful defence counts as a win for the purposes of this table, even if the match was drawn. The table is made more complicated by the split between the "Classical" and FIDE world titles between 1993 and 2006. If total number of championship wins is identical, the number of wins at undisputed championships, the number of years as undisputed champion and the number of years as champion are used as tie-breakers (in that order). If all numbers are the same, the players are listed by year of first victory at world championships (in chronological order).

Champion	Number of wins				Years as	
Champion	Total	Undisputed	FIDE	Classical	Champion	Undisputed champion
(Germany) (Germany) Emanuel Lasker	6	6			27	27
(Soviet Union) (Russia) Garry Kasparov	6	4		2	15	8
(Soviet Union) (Russia) Anatoly Karpov	6	3	3		16	10
(Soviet Union) Mikhail Botvinnik	5	5			13	13
(Norway) Magnus Carlsen	5	5			10	10
(India) Viswanathan Anand	5	4	1		8	6
(France) Alexander Alekhine	4	4			17	17
(Austria-Hungary) (United States) Wilhelm Steinitz	4	4			8	8
(Russia) Vladimir Kramnik	3	1		2	7	1
(Soviet Union) Tigran Petrosian	2	2			6	6
(Cuba) José Raúl Capablanca	1	1			6	6
(Soviet Union) Boris Spassky	1	1			3	3
(United States) Bobby Fischer	1	1			3	3
(Netherlands) Max Euwe	1	1			2	2
(India) Gukesh Dommaraju	1	1			2	2
(Soviet Union) Vasily Smyslov	1	1			1	1
(Soviet Union) Mikhail Tal	1	1			1	1
(China) Ding Liren	1	1			1	1
(Ukraine) Ruslan Ponomariov	1		1		2	0
(Russia) Alexander Khalifman	1		1		1	0
(Uzbekistan) Rustam Kasimdzhanov	1		1		1	0
(Bulgaria) Veselin Topalov	1		1		1	0

== Other world chess championships ==
Restricted events:

- Women's World Chess Championship
- World Junior Chess Championship (under 20 years of age)
- World Youth Chess Championship (lower age groups)
- World Senior Chess Championship
- World Amateur Chess Championship

Other time limits:

- World Rapid Chess Championship
- World Blitz Chess Championship
- World Correspondence Chess Championship

Teams:

- Chess Olympiad

Computer chess:

- World Computer Chess Championship

Chess Problems:

- World Chess Solving Championship

Chess variants:

- World Chess960 Championship (Also called Fischer random chess and Freestyle chess.)

== See also ==
- Comparison of top chess players throughout history
- List of world championships in mind sports
