= Louis-Charles Mahé de La Bourdonnais =

French chess player (1795–1840)

Louis de La Bourdonnais
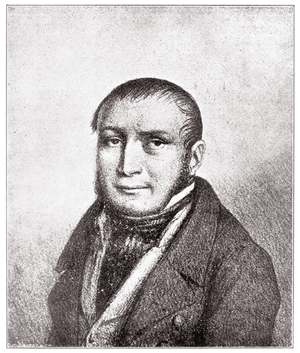
- The only known likeness of La Bourdonnais

Personal information
- Born: Louis-Charles Mahé de La Bourdonnais; 1795 Réunion
- Died: 13 December 1840 (aged 44–45) London, Great Britain

Chess career
- Country: France

Louis-Charles Mahé de La Bourdonnais (1795 – December 1840) was a French chess master, possibly the strongest player in the early 19th century.

== Early life ==
La Bourdonnais was born on the island of Réunion in the Indian Ocean in 1795. He was the grandson of Bertrand-François Mahé de La Bourdonnais. He learned chess in 1814 and began to take the game seriously in 1818, regularly playing at the Café de la Régence. He took lessons from Jacques François Mouret, his first teacher, and within two years he became one of the best players of the Café.

== Chess career ==
La Bourdonnais was forced to earn his living as a professional chess player after squandering his fortune on ill-advised land deals. He played in an era before a World Chess Championship was established, but was considered to be perhaps the strongest player in the world from 1821 — when he became able to beat his chess teacher Alexandre Deschapelles — until his death in 1840. The most famous match series in that time was the series against Alexander McDonnell in 1834. These matches of 85 games were analyzed by Kasparov in his book My Great Predecessors.

== Death ==
He died penniless in London on 13 December 1840, having been forced to sell all his possessions, including his clothes, to satisfy his creditors. George Walker arranged his burial a stone's throw from his old rival Alexander McDonnell at Kensal Green Cemetery.

== Notable games ==
McDonnell vs. La Bourdonnais

Position: h1 white king, d1 white rook, h2 white pawn, g2 white pawn, f2 black pawn, e2 black pawn, d2 black pawn, b2 white pawn, a2 white pawn, c3 white queen, a5 black pawn, h7 black pawn, g7 black pawn, d7 white pawn, h8 black king, g8 black rook, d8 black bishop

Final position after 37...e2
- Alexander McDonnell vs. Louis-Charles Mahé de La Bourdonnais, 16, London 1834, Sicilian Defense: Old Sicilian. Open (B32), 0–1 A game demonstrating the strength of pawns. Its end position is one of the most surprising in the history of chess.
- Louis-Charles Mahé de La Bourdonnais vs. Alexander McDonnell, 3, London 1834, Queen's Gambit Accepted: Old Variation (D20), 1–0 La Bourdonnais punishes McDonnell's premature attack.

== See also ==
- List of chess games
- McDonnell versus De La Bourdonnais, Match 4 (16), London 1834
