= Alexander McDonnell (chess player) =

Irish chess player (1798–1835)

Personal information
- Born: 22 May 1798 Belfast, Ireland
- Died: 15 September 1835 (aged 37) London, United Kingdom

Chess career
- Country: Ireland / United Kingdom

Alexander McDonnell (1798–1835), sometimes spelled MacDonnell, (Note: The spelling M'Donnell, found in some old sources, is in fact a typographic variant of McDonnell.) was an Irish chess master, who played a series of six matches with the world's leading chess player, Louis-Charles Mahé de La Bourdonnais, in 1834.

== West India Interest ==
Alexander McDonnell was born in Belfast in 1798. His father was a surgeon. He worked as a merchant in the West Indies, where he became a friend of Major Thomas Moody ADC Kt. who described him as 'unquestionably clever' and of a 'cool and reasoning manner'.

In 1820, he settled in London, where he became the secretary of the Committee of West Indian Merchants whose interest he advocated. McDonnell was a Whig whom Moody invited to Downing Street to discuss economics.

== Chess career ==
In 1825, he became a pupil of William Lewis, who was the leading chess-player in Britain. McDonnell outplayed Lewis until Lewis refused to play against him.

Around 1825–1826, McDonnell played Captain Evans, while the latter was on shore leave in London. McDonnell was beaten with what is now regarded in chess circles as the creation of the Evans Gambit (1.e4 e5 2.Nf3 Nc6 3.Bc4 Bc5 4.b4).

In 1831, along with George Walker, he became a founding member of the Westminster Chess Club and was acclaimed as England's best player.

=== La Bourdonnais matches ===
At that time, the world's strongest player was the French aristocrat Louis-Charles Mahé de La Bourdonnais. Between June and October 1834, La Bourdonnais and McDonnell played a series of six matches, a total of eighty-five games, at the Westminster Chess Club in London. McDonnell won the second match, while La Bourdonnais won the first, third, fourth and fifth. The sixth match was unfinished.

In the first game of the third match, McDonnell successfully introduced a new variation in the King's Gambit (1.e4 e5 2.f4 exf4 3.Nf3 g5 4.Bc4 g4 5.Nc3), known today as the McDonnell Gambit.

== Death ==
McDonnell suffered from Bright's disease, which is now known as nephritis, which detracts from the function of the kidneys. It killed him in London on 15 September 1835, before his match with La Bourdonnais could be resumed.

When La Bourdonnais died penniless in 1840, George Walker arranged to have him buried in London's Kensal Green Cemetery, near to where his rival McDonnell is buried.

== Notable games ==
- Louis-Charles Mahé de La Bourdonnais vs. Alexander McDonnell, 04, London 1834, Queen's Gambit Accepted: Central Variation. McDonnell Defense (D20), 0–1 The first immortal game of the history of chess, according to Reuben Fine. A purely positional sacrifice of a queen for two minor pieces.
- Louis-Charles Mahé de La Bourdonnais vs. Alexander McDonnell, London 1834, Bishop's Opening: Lopez Variation (C23), 0–1 An interesting encounter with chances and errors on both sides, ending with a nice two-knights mate.
- McDonnell versus De La Bourdonnais, Match 4 (16), London 1834 A classic game demonstrating the power of a mobile central block of pawns.
