= Alexandre Deschapelles =

French chess player (1780–1847)

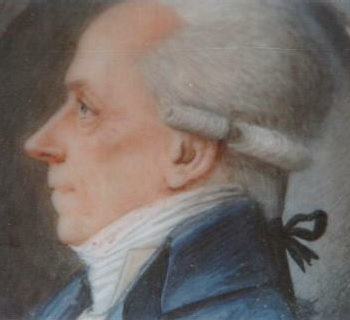
- The only known likeness of Deschapelles.

Personal information
- Born: Alexandre Louis Honoré Lebreton Deschapelles; March 7, 1780 Ville-d'Avray, France
- Died: October 27, 1847 (aged 67) Paris, France

Chess career
- Country: France

Alexandre Deschapelles (French pronunciation: [alɛksɑ̃dʁ deʃapɛl]; March 7, 1780, in Ville-d'Avray near Versailles – October 27, 1847, in Paris) was a French chess player who, between the death of François-André Danican Philidor and the rise of Louis-Charles Mahé de La Bourdonnais, was probably the strongest player in the world.

== Family background ==
His parents were Louis Gatien Le Breton Comte des Chapelles, born in New Orleans, Louisiana in 1741, and Marie Françoise Geneviève d'Hémeric des Cartouzières from Béziers in the south of France. Louis Gatien served as an officer in a dragoon regiment and later, through the influence of his close friend, the future admiral Louis-René Levassor de Latouche Tréville, became an officer in the royal household (Maison du Roi) with a number of rooms near the king's chambers in the château of Versailles.

== Military career ==
Deschapelles was sent to the renowned military academy at Brienne with a view to a military career. When the influence of Louis Gatien's patron Latouche-Tréville ceased in 1791 and with the Reign of Terror looming, Louis Gatien decided to emigrate to Germany with his wife and two sisters. Soon after his father's emigration, Alexandre had to leave Brienne to join the French Republican army. A soldier in Napoleon's army, Deschapelles lost his right hand in battle and was thereafter nicknamed "Manchot" (one-armed). He also received a massive sabre wound down the entire length of his face, which caused the phrenology enthusiasts of his era to suggest "cranial sabre-wounds" were responsible for his amazing chess skill.

== Career as a player of chess and other games ==
Deschapelles had an incredible aptitude for games. Three months after learning the moves of Polish Draughts, he defeated the French champion of that game, and he claimed to have learned all of his chess knowledge in just four days.

He was the teacher of Jacques François Mouret and later, c. 1820, he accepted Louis-Charles Mahé de La Bourdonnais as a student. After defeating John Cochrane and William Lewis two years later, Deschapelles switched to playing Whist (the Deschapelles coup in Contract bridge is named after him). Returning to chess competition in the mid-1830s, Deschapelles continued his trademark of always giving his opponents "odds".

Deschapelles reportedly once asked an opponent if they would play a game for stakes, to which they stated "My religion forbids me to play for money." Deschapelles replied "Mine forbids me to be absurd!"

=== Notable chess matches ===
- 1821 John Cochrane, 6-1, with Cochrane having odds of a pawn and two moves
- 1821 William Lewis, 1-2, with Lewis having odds of a pawn and a move
- 1836 Pierre de Saint-Amant, 1½-1½
- 1842 Pierre de Saint-Amant, 3-2

== Coat of arms ==
Given to his grandfather Louis Cézaire Le Breton des Chapelles in 1760 by the French juge d'armes: "A silver shield with three green palms posed two and one. The shield is stamped with the profile of a helmet adorned with silver and green mantling."

== Sources ==
- Baudrier (Pierre).- Insurgés et forces de l'ordre en 1832. Alexandre Deschapelles..., Bulletin de l'Association d'Histoire et d'Archéologie du XXe arrqondissesment de Paris, N° 50, 4ème trimestre 2011, pp. 7–27.
