= Jacques François Mouret =

French chess master and teacher

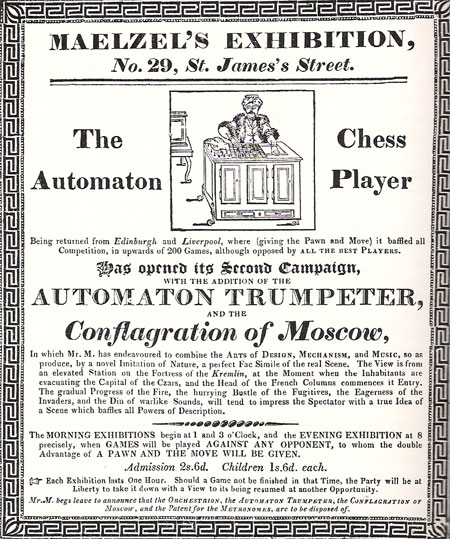
Exhibition advertisement of The Turk in 1819, when it was operated by Mouret

Jacques François Mouret (1780–1837) was an early nineteenth-century French chess master and the chess tutor of the future King Louis Philippe I.

== Biography ==
Mouret was the nephew of the chess master Philidor. He learned chess at the Café de la Régence from Philidor's students, Bernard and Carlier, and was a pupil of Alexandre Deschapelles. He later taught Louis-Charles Mahé de La Bourdonnais and gave chess lessons to the children of the French King Louis Philippe I.

In 1819, he became the operator of the chess-playing automaton hoax, the Mechanical Turk during its English tour. He is reported to have disclosed the mechanism behind the automaton to the press.

Contemporary accounts state that Mouret struggled with alcoholism. In 1842, after Mouret's death, Alphonse Delannoy, editor of the chess periodical Le Palamède, wrote that he was a student and practitioner of chess theory who supported himself through the game, while noting that he was frequently intoxicated. In 1850, George Walker also documented Mouret’s heavy consumption of brandy.

The 1836 book, Elementary Treatise on the Game of Chess, is often attributed to Mouret based on its preface. A later newspaper advertisement, however, indicated that his role was limited to that of an editor.

Near the end of his life, Mouret experienced significant financial and health difficulties. In early 1837, Le Palamède published an appeal for assistance on his behalf, which was followed by his obituary in the next issue. Members of the Chess Club of Paris covered his funeral expenses.

== Mouret and The Turk ==
Mouret was one of several chess players who operated the chess-playing automaton known as the Mechanical Turk from within. The device, created by Wolfgang von Kempelen, was first presented to the Austrian court in 1770 and exhibited throughout Europe during the early 19th century. After Kempelen died in 1805, it was acquired by Johann Maelzel, who exhibited it in Europe and, starting in 1826, the United States. Other chess players who operated the device include Johann Baptist Allgaier, William Schlumberger, Hyacinthe Henri Boncourt, and William Lewis.

A book published in 1820 recorded fifty games played by the automaton during its 1819 exhibition in London, when it was operated by Mouret. According to the book's preface, by February 1820, the automaton had played about 300 games—reportedly losing only six—even while typically giving opponents the advantage of a pawn and the first move. While Mouret was operating the Mechanical Turk, Johann Nepomuk Maelzel, the owner of the automaton, allegedly fell into debt to Mouret. While the automaton was being exhibited in Amsterdam, reportedly at the invitation of the King of Holland, Maelzel found Mouret ill and unable to perform. When asked whether he could recover in time for the scheduled demonstration, Mouret is said to have replied that payment of the 1,500 francs owed to him would resolve the situation. The account states Maelzel paid the debt, after which Mouret recovered and resumed operating the automaton.

Accounts indicate that Mouret may have later disclosed that the Turk was not, in fact, automated. In 1834, an article titled An attempt to analyze the automaton chess-player of M. Kempelen was published in Le Magasin Pittoresque. The article, published anonymously, described how a person could operate the machine from inside. Some sources, including Walker, attribute this disclosure to Mouret, who, at the time, was reported to be in poor health and experiencing financial difficulties.

== Play style ==
=== French Defense ===
Mouret is also associated with the early use of the French Defense. He is reported to have introduced the opening to a player at the Café de la Régence, identified as M. Chamouillet, in exchange for advice on purchasing a mirror. In 1834, Chamouillet was part of the Paris committee in a correspondence match between teams from London and Paris, and advocated for the use of the opening. Following this match, which was won by the Parisians, the opening became known as the French Defense.

=== Play style ===
In describing Mouret's playing style, Le Palamède stated:

Son jeu était très correct et d'une très grande force, principalement sous le rapport de la défense. ("His game was very respectable and of great strength, especially in terms of defense.")

The large majority of Mouret's surviving games are those played by the Turk and collected by Hunnemann. In these games, according to Walker:

"Mouret shows a strong and effective style. These games contain a fair specimen of Mouret's great skill and embody some beautiful emanations of genius. Throughout the whole, he gives the pawn and move, numbering among his opponents Messrs. Brand, Cochrane, Keen, and Mercier, some of the first chess-players of the time."

The analysis of those games, however, reveals that most were won by Mouret due to simple tactical mistakes or blunders by some of his opponents (who were called by George Walker "some of the first chess-players of the time").

The following game is a typical example of this.

Brandreth - Chess Automaton (Mouret)

London 1819 (remove Black's pawn on f7)

1. e4 e6 2. d4 g6 3. Nf3 d5 4. e5 c5 5. c3 Nc6 6. Bb5 Qb6 7. Bxc6+ bxc6 8. O-O cxd4 9. cxd4 c5 10. Nc3 cxd4 11. Nxd4 Bd7 12. Qd3 a6 13. Rb1 Bg7 14. f4 Nh6 15. Kh1 O-O 16. h3 Qd8 17. Nb3 Nf5 18. Ne2? Bb5 19. Qd1 Bxe2 0-1

Analysis assisted by the chess engine Firebird 1.2 shows that White could have played a better 12th move with 12. Nxd5 exd5 13.e6 and if 13... Bc6 14. Nxc6 Qxc6, then 15. Qd4. Mouret may have had a "blind spot" for this tactical pattern (sacrifice on d5 followed by e5-e6). One example is Mouret's only loss against John Cochrane (the overall score was +3 =1 -1 in favor of Mouret) and available on chessgames.com.

Diagram 1

Position: h1 white king, d1 white rook, c1 white rook, h2 white pawn, g2 white pawn, e2 white bishop, b2 white pawn, a2 white pawn, e3 white bishop, c3 white knight, f4 white pawn, e5 white pawn, d5 black pawn, b5 black pawn, g6 black pawn, e6 black pawn, c6 black knight, a6 black pawn, h7 black pawn, d7 black bishop, h8 black rook, f8 black bishop, e8 black king, a8 black rook

Cochrane-Mouret: Position after 15...Bd7

In the majority of cases, however, Mouret's opponent seems not to have taken advantage of this possibility. In Diagram 1, for example, the position of another game Cochrane – Mouret, London 1819 after Black's 15th move, is reported. White played 16. a3 and the game ended in a draw. Mouret could have gained a better position after 16. Nxd5 exd5 17. e6 (per FireBird 1.2).

Cochrane - Chess Automaton (Mouret)

This game is an example of Mouret's treatment of the pawn structure similar to that derived from today's advanced variation of the French Defense.

London 1819 (remove Black's pawn on f7)

1. e4 e6 2. d4 c6 3. f4 d5 4. e5 c5 5. c3 Nc6 6. Bb5 Today, this plan is known to be inaccurate, but it was played frequently by the Automaton's opponents 6...Qb6 7. Bxc6+ bxc6 8. Nf3 Ba6 9. Kf2 in another game, after the better (according to FireBird 1.2) 9. Ng5, Mouret answered with 9... Bc8 (Tremaine - Mouret, London 1819) 9... cxd4 10. Nxd4 c5 11. Nf3 Nh6 12. h3 Be7 13. g4 O-O 14. Qb3 Qc6 15. Kg3 Rae8 16. Qd1 Nf7 17. h4 Bd8 18. Qc2 Bb7 and FireBird 1.2 evaluates that Black's position amply compensates for the pawn. After 19. Ng5 White's initiative on the kingside was rebutted with 19... Bxg5 20. hxg5 g6 21. Qh2 h6 22. gxh6, Mouret could have played 22...d4! (FireBird 1.2) to his advantage. Instead he played the somewhat inferior 22... Kh7 and won in a few moves after his opponent's blunder.

Mouret's most well-known game is a loss played, together with Boncourt, against De La Bourdonnais. It is an Evans Gambit, which held a certain theoretical interest at the time, and which was reported on both in Le Palamède and the Chess Player's Chronicle and was referenced in the 7th edition of the Handbuch des Schachspiels.
