= William Schlumberger =

French chess player (1800–1838)

William Schlumberger (March 25, 1799 – February 20, 1838) was an Alsatian chess master. He is known to have taught Pierre Charles Fournier de Saint-Amant to play chess. For a time, Schlumberger operated the Turk, a chess-playing machine which was purported to be an automaton, after he was hired by Bavarian musician and showman Johann Nepomuk Mälzel. Schlumberger acted as the Turk's director in Europe and in the United States until his death from yellow fever in 1838.

== Biography ==
The main source of information on Schlumberger's life is George Allen's "The History of the Automaton Chess-Player in America", published within a book by Willard Fiske. Unless otherwise indicated, the brief biography given below derives from Allen's "History".

Schlumberger was born in Mulhouse, Alsace, a region often fought over by France and Germany. He belonged to a wealthy family, and attained a very high education. He was considered very strong in mathematics and he spoke not only French and German with which he was equally familiar from childhood, but also in English. He described himself as having started in business, for which he had been so carefully educated, in Paris, where he and his brother were put in charge of the dépôt of the family establishment at Mulhouse. He was thrown out of business by a commercial misfortune, and then he began to support himself by giving lessons in chess at the Café de la Régence, where he was one of the leading players, but known only as Mulhouse (a nickname probably given to him by Saint-Amant). When the young St. Amant began to frequent the Café de la Régence, around 1823, he found Mulhouse capable of playing with La Bourdonnais at no greater odds than the pawn and move, and fully equal to Boncourt and Mouret; and so St. Amant took chess lessons from him. Many years later, he gratefully acknowledged that he owed his initiation to chess to Schlumberger.

Schlumberger was dependent solely upon his earnings as a chess-teacher, a precarious situation. So he accepted the offer of Maelzel, the owner of the Turk, to operate it during its tour in America for fifty dollars a month plus travel expenses. During the tour, however, there were some incidents that almost revealed the secret of the Turk. In Baltimore, two boys watching a performance from a roof, saw Schlumberger come out of the machine. An article based on their account, "The Chess-Player Discovered," appeared in the Baltimore Gazette on Friday, June 1, 1827, exposing the matter.

Later, in Richmond, the Turk was observed by Edgar Allan Poe, who later wrote his essay "Maelzel's Chess Player" published in April 1836. He observed:

There is a man, Schlumberger, who attends him wherever he goes, but who has no ostensible occupation other than that of assisting in the packing and unpacking of the automaton. This man is about the medium size, and has a remarkable stoop in the shoulders. Whether he professes to play chess or not, we are not informed. It is quite certain, however, that he is never to be seen during the exhibition of the Chess Player, although frequently visible just before and just after the exhibition. Moreover, some years ago Maelzel visited Richmond with his automata, and exhibited them, we believe, in the house now occupied by M. Bossieux as a Dancing Academy. Schlumberger was suddenly taken ill, and during his illness there was no exhibition of the Chess Player. These facts are well known to many of our citizens. The reason assigned for the suspension of the Chess-Player's performances, was not the illness of Schlumberger. The inferences from all this we leave, without farther comment, to the reader.

On November 9, 1837, Schlumberger and Maelzel sailed to Havana, Cuba. There, Schlumberger contracted yellow fever and died in February 1838.

== Chess games ==
Allen's account describes Schlumberger as a rapid chess-player, but not particularly strong in the endgame. It also adds some details about his opening repertoire:

When the Automaton adhered to its claim of the first move, the game was made a gambit; when the adversary had the move, Schlumberger invariably resorted to Mouret's favorite defence of King's Pawn one—a Boeotian defence, thoroughly understood at the Café de la Régence—so often played afterwards by La Bourdonnais, so thoroughly detested by McDonnell In playing end-games, Schlumberger did not come off quite so well: he was sometimes beaten, although very seldom.

A very few and rare games of Schlumberger games survived, however. The following game, lost by the Automaton, is not particularly well played; but it has a certain historical importance being perhaps the first published game by an American woman chess player. Here it is presented with the comments of C. H. Stanley

Mrs. F - The Turk (Schlumberger)
Philadelphia, 1827
1. e4 e6 Most of our readers, we presume, are aware that the Automaton was a Turk; had he been a Christian, he surely would not have played "K. P. one" against a lady. 2. Nc3 d5 3. Qf3 Nf6 4. Bd3 An eccentric style of move, but by no means bad play under the circumstances 4...c5 His "Turkship" has not yet discovered the dexterity of his fair antagonist; expecting to achieve an easy victory he considers it beneath his dignity to take care of his Pawns. 5. b3 Bd6 6. exd5 exd5 7. Nxd5 Nxd5 8. Qxd5 O-O 9. Bb2 Mrs. F. shows a thorough knowledge of the peculiar position under which her various Pieces will act most favorably. There is more natural genius displayed by her in the conduct of this game than is met with in by far the greater portion of the games which come under our notice. 9... Nc6 10. a3 Be6 11. Qe4 g6 12. O-O-O Qd7 13. h3 Bf5 14. Qf3 Bxd3 15. Qxd3 Rae8 16. Nf3 a6 17. g4 b5 18. c4 We like the boldness and decision of Mrs. F.'s style of play; this is true Chess. Blue Beard will shortly make the unwelcome discovery that he has for once at least "caught a Tartar". If the ladies of his own country possessed the characteristics evinced by Mrs. F., their position would be far different from that which it now is. 18...bxc4 19. Qxc4 Rb8 20. Kb1 Qb7 21. Qc3 Threatening an immediate checkmate. 21...Nd4 Badly played; his only chance to save the game would be to push King's Bishop's Pawn one square 22. Nxd4 Be5 Play as he will, he must now lose a Piece, as, should he take Kt. with Pawn, Mrs. F. would take Pawn with Queen, and in order to avert the checkmate then threatened, it would be necessary to abandon the Bishop to his fate. 23. Qxc5 Bxd4 24. Qxd4 f6 25. Qc4+ Kg7 26. Ka2 Rfc8 27. Qa4 Rc2 28. b4 Qd5+ 29. Qb3 Qe4 30. Rhe1 Qc6 31. Rc1 Rxc1 32. Rxc1 Qd6 33. Rd1 a5 34. b5 a4 35. Qxa4 Qd5+ 36. Qb3 Qc5 37. d4 Qg5 38. a4 Qf4 39. Qg3 resigns. Never was better account rendered of Infidel and Saracen, on the sandy desert of his own soil, than is now given by the fair champion of Christendom of her unbelieving foe, on the chequered field of his own battle-ground.

George Allen gives the following explanation of Schlumberger's poor play during this game.

Maelzel's first exhibition-season in Philadelphia extended from 26 December 1826, to 20 March 1827. The Hall was open twice a day—at noon and in the evening—and full games as well as end-games were played, but whether indifferently at either hour I do not know. The Automaton lost one end-game—the famous Three Pawn position—to Mr. Daniel Smith; and one full game to a lady, Mrs. Fisher. The latter game happens to be the only specimen of poor Schlumberger's play—I will not say skill—that has been preserved. It was printed at the time in the Philadelphia Gazette, and was afterwards reported in Mr. Stanley's American Chess Magazine (p. 57). It was played at two different sittings, on the 30th and 31st days of January. Maelzel's devotion to the fair sex was quite too profound to allow his Automaton to insist upon his prerogative to take the first move; nay, Schlumberger is said to have had peremptory orders to get beaten. After the lady's 39th move, Mr. Maelzel (says the newspaper), at this stage of the game, considering it lost, politely thanked Mrs. F., and observed that he was fairly beaten. He also remarked that the Automaton had been conquered but three times—once in Paris, once in Boston, and by Mrs. F. of Philadelphia.

The other of Schlumberger's games which has survived is probably more interesting. It was played with Charles Vezin (1781–1853), considered the founder and father of chess in Philadelphia and a good player. The notes to the game are from Chess in Philadelphia: a brief history of the game in Philadelphia edited by G. C. Reichhelm and W. P. Shipley, 1898. Additionally, analysis carried out with the chess engine FireBird 1.2 is reported in square parentheses.

Diagram 1

Position: h1 white king, f1 white queen, a1 white rook, h2 white pawn, g2 white pawn, b2 white pawn, a2 white pawn, c3 white knight, b3 white knight, h5 white bishop, f5 white rook, d5 black bishop, h6 black queen, f6 black knight, c6 black knight, h7 black pawn, g7 black pawn, b7 black pawn, a7 black pawn, h8 black rook, g8 black king, d8 black rook

Vezin – Schlumberger: Position after 18...Qh6

C. Vezin - W. Schlumberger
Played in Philadelphia at a private party between Mr. Charles Vezin and Maetzel's Automaton Chess Player. It took three sittings, starting January 15, 1827, continuing January 22 and finishing January 23.
1.e4 e6 2.Bc4 Not well opened. In those days the study of closed openings was not pursued. 2...d5 3.exd5 exd5 4.Be2 f5 5.d4 c5 6.Nf3 Nc6 7.0–0 Nf6 8.c4 cxd4 9.Nxd4 Bc5 10.Be3 Qb6 11.Nb3 This promises best in this situation. Mr. V. cleverly escapes. 11...Bxe3 12.fxe3 Qxe3+ 13.Kh1 Be if 13...d4 then 14.Bf3 Ne4 15.Bxe4 fxe4 16.Re1 etc. 14.cxd5 Bxd5 [14...0–0–0!, Firebird, now the game is approximately equal according to the chess engine] 15.Bh5+ Kf8 16.Rxf5 Rd8 17.Qf1 Kg8? [Firebird] 18.Nc3 Qh6 (see Diagram 1) 19.Bf3? [19.Nxd5 Nxh5 20.Qf3! g6 21.Rxh5 gxh5 22.Nf6+ wins, Firebird] 19...Be6 20.Rb5 Rf8 21.Rxb7 Ng4 The Automaton appears to be growing an attack, but white’s 23rd move claims his particular attention 22.Qg1 Nce5 23.Nd5 Ng6 24.Rf1 Qg5 25.Qd4 Qe5 26.Qxe5 N4xe5 27.Nc5 Bg4 28.Rb3?! [28.h3 h5 29.hxg4 hxg4+ 30.Kg1 gxf3 31.Ne6 Rf7 32.Rb8+ Nf8 33.Ne7+ Rxe7 34.Rxf8+ Kh7 35.Ng5+ Kg6 36.Rxh8 wins for white, Firebird] 28...h5 29.Kg1 Bxf3 30.gxf3 Nh4? [according to Firebird, black defense, after his mistake at move 17, was, considering the circumstances, accurate, but here he slips again] 31.f4 Ng4 32.h3 Nh6 33.Ne6 [33.Ne7+ Kh7 34.Ne6 wins, Firebird] 33...Re8 34.Ndc7 Rc8 35.Rd1 N6f5 36.Rd7 Rh6 37.Rbd3 Rf6 38.Ng5 Ng6 39.Nce6 Nf8 40.Rd8 Rc1+ 41.Kf2 Rc2+ 42.Ke1 Rxb2 The white forces have been so well managed that Monsieur Schlumberger, who played in the Automaton, considers it is time to prepare for a draw. 43.Ra8 Nh4? [computer analysis indicated that black after 30...Nh4? defended well, but, now, the same move is again a mistake, better was 43...Rb6, Firebird] 44.Rdd8 Nhg6 45.Rxa7 Nxf4 46.Rxg7+ Kh8 47.Nf7+? [the last opportunity for a comfortable win was 47.Rf7!, Firebird] 47...Rxf7 48.Rxf7 N4xe6 49.Rdxf8+ Nxf8 50.Rxf8+ Kg7 51.Rf2 He might have tried 51.Ra8 and then defend his Ph3 by Ra3, but the game was drawn with proper play 51...Rb1+ 52.Ke2 Rh1 53.Rf3 Rh2+ 54.Kd3 Rxa2 ½–½

== Bibliography ==
- Tom Standage, The Turk: The Life and Times of the Famous Eighteenth-Century Chess-Playing Machine. Walker and Company, New York City, 2002. ISBN 0-8027-1391-2
- Gerald M. Levitt, The Turk, Chess Automaton. McFarland and Company Inc. Publishers, Jefferson, North Carolina, 2000.
- Thomas Gavin, King Kill. Jonathan Cape, London, 1977. ISBN 0-224-014463. A novel on Schlumberger's life.
- Gaige, Jeremy (1987), Chess Personalia, A Biobibliography, McFarland, p. 377, ISBN 0-7864-2353-6
