= Moxon's Master =

1899 short story by Ambrose Bierce

"Moxon's Master" is a short story by American writer Ambrose Bierce, which speculates on the nature of life and intelligence. It describes a chess-playing automaton that murders its creator. First published in The San Francisco Examiner on April 16, 1899, it is one of the first descriptions of a robot in English-language literature, though written well before the word 'robot' came to be used. The story was included in the 1910 edition of the short story anthology Can Such Things Be?.

== Plot summary ==
The master, Moxon, who creates a chess-playing automaton, boasts to the narrator that even though machines have no brains, they can still think and demonstrate intelligence or mind and therefore should be treated just like men of flesh and blood. After a thorough discussion about what it means to "think" and what is the nature of "intelligence", the narrator leaves Moxon's house in confusion.

The narrator returns to Moxon's house later in the midst of a rainstorm to learn more. He enters secretly and finds Moxon playing chess with an automaton. Moxon wins the game. This agitates the automaton who kills him in a fit of rage. Lightning strikes the room. The house is engulfed in flames. The narrator loses consciousness.

The narrator wakes up in a hospital room where Haley, Moxon's servant, tells him that he saved him from imminent death. Haley corroborates the details. Nevertheless, the narrator questions whether what he saw was real.

== See also ==
- List of fictional robots and androids
- The Turk
- Walker Chess-player
