= William Lewis (chess player) =

English chess player and author (1787–1870)

Posthumous depiction of William Lewis from 1906

William Lewis (1787–1870) was an English chess player and writer, best known for the Lewis Countergambit. He may have been the first player ever described as a Grandmaster of the game.

== Life and works ==
Born in Birmingham, William Lewis moved as a young man to London where he worked for a merchant for a short period. He became a student of chess player Jacob Sarratt, but in later years he showed himself to be rather ungrateful towards his teacher. Although he considered Sarratt's Treatise on the Game of Chess (1808) a "poorly written book", in 1822 Lewis published a second edition of it three years after Sarratt's death in direct competition with Sarratt's own superior revision published posthumously in 1821 by Sarratt's poverty-stricken widow. In 1843, many players contributed to a fund to help the old widow, but Lewis' name is not on the list of subscribers.

Around 1819 Lewis was the hidden player inside the Turk (a famous automaton), meeting all-comers successfully. He suggested to Johann Maelzel that Peter Unger Williams, a fellow ex-student of Sarratt, should be the next person to operate inside the machine. When P. U. Williams played a game against the Turk, Lewis recognised the old friend from his style of play (the operator could not see his opponents) and convinced Maelzel to reveal to Williams the secret of the Turk. Later, P. U. Williams himself took Lewis' place inside the machine.

Lewis visited Paris along with Scottish player John Cochrane in 1821, where they played with Alexandre Deschapelles, receiving the advantage of pawn and move. He won the short match (+1 =2).

Lewis' career as an author began at this time, and included translations of the works of Greco and Carrera, published in 1819 and 1822 respectively.

He was the leading English player in the correspondence match between London and Edinburgh in 1824, won by the Scots (+2 −1 =2). Later, he published a book on the match with analysis of the games. In the period of 1834–1836 he was also part of the Committee of the Westminster Chess Club, who played and lost (−2) the match by correspondence with the Paris Chess Club. The other players were his students McDonnell and Walker, while the French line up included Boncourt, Alexandre, St. Amant and Chamouillet. When De La Bourdonnais visited England in 1825, Lewis played about 70 games with the French master. Seven of these games probably represented a match that Lewis lost (+2 −5).

Lewis enjoyed a considerable reputation as a chess player in his time. A correspondent writing to the weekly magazine Bell's Life in 1838 called him "our past grandmaster", the first known use of the term in chess. Starting from 1825 he preserved his reputation by the same means that Deschapelles used in France, by refusing to play anyone on even terms. In the same year Lewis founded a Chess Club where he gave lessons to, amongst others, Walker and McDonnell. He was declared bankrupt in 1827 due to bad investments on a patent for the construction of pianos and his chess club was forced to close. The next three years were quite difficult until in 1830 he got a job that assured him of solid financial security for the rest of his life. Thanks to this job, he could focus on writing his two major works: Series of Progressive Lessons (1831) and Second Series of Progressive Lessons (1832). The first series of the Lessons were more elementary in character, and designed for the use of beginners; the second series, on the other hand, went deeply into all the known openings. Here, for the first time we find the Evans Gambit, which is named after its inventor, Capt. Evans.

The works of Lewis (together with his teacher Sarratt) were oriented towards the rethinking of the strictly Philidorian principles of play in favour of the Modenese school of Del Rio, Lolli and Ponziani. When he realised that he could not give an advantage to the new generation of British players, Lewis withdrew gradually from active play (in the same way that Deschapelles did after his defeat against De La Bourdonnais).

After his retirement he wrote other chess treatises, but his isolation prevented him from assimilating the positional ideas of the new generation of chess players. For this reason, Hooper and Whyld in their Oxford Companion to Chess describe the last voluminous work of Lewis, A Treatise on Chess (1844), as already "out of date when published".

He died in 1870 and was buried on the east side of Highgate Cemetery. His grave (no.12861) has no headstone or marker.
