= White Tiger (1923 film) =

1923 film

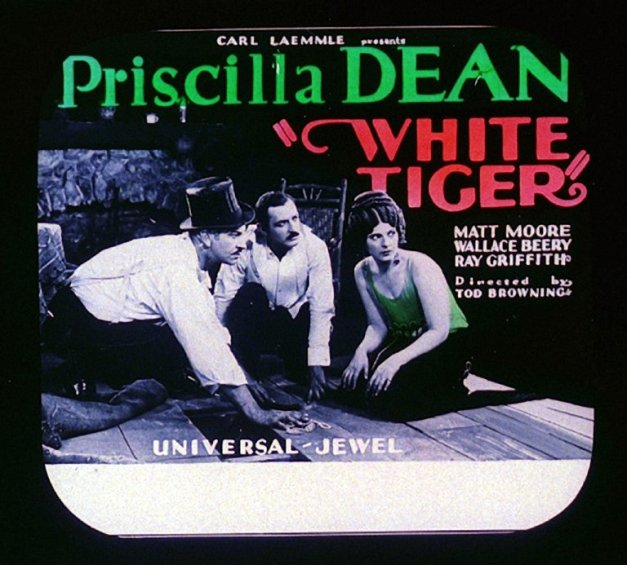
- Lantern slide
- Directed by: Tod Browning
- Written by: Tod Browning; Charles Kenyon
- Starring: Priscilla Dean; Matt Moore; Wallace Beery
- Cinematography: William Fildew
- Distributed by: Universal Pictures
- Release date: December 17, 1923
- Running time: 86 minutes
- Country: United States
- Language: Silent (English intertitles)

White Tiger (1923)

White Tiger is a 1923 American silent crime film directed by Tod Browning starring Priscilla Dean and featuring Wallace Beery in a supporting role.

== Plot ==
As the film opens, Mike Donovan is a London criminal with two young children, Sylvia and Roy. He is betrayed to the police by his associate, Hawkes and dies while trying to escape arrest. Hawkes flees to Paris with Sylvia, leaving Roy in London. Sylvia and Roy grow up believing the other is dead.

After many years, Hawkes and the adult Sylvia return to London. There they encounter "the Kid," the operator of a chess scam. He hides inside an automaton and simulates the machine playing chess. Neither Hawkes or Sylvia realize that the Kid is actually Roy.

Hawkes, Sylvia and the Kid decided to work together on a scam in the United States. They take the automaton to New York City, where Hawkes assumes the name of "Count Donelli" and rents a mansion on Fifth Avenue in Manhattan. Sylvia poses as the Count Donelli's daughter and the Kid as his secretary. The three thieves plan to bring the automaton to the houses of the wealthy to "play chess". Once inside, they will commit jewel robberies. They meet Dick Longworth, a rich New Yorker who hosts the three of them at his hunting cabin in the Catskill Mountains north of New York City. During this time, Sylvia develops a crush on Longworth.

Hawkes and Sylvia later brings the automaton, with the Kid hiding inside, to the home of Longworth's sister for a chess match. After it ends, the Kid secretly emerges from the automaton and steals jewelry from an upstairs safe. However, the butler catches him. Recognizing that the Kid is not a house guest, the butler brings him downstairs for questioning. Hawkes and Sylvia flee the house. The Kid pretends to be deaf and refuses to talk. When Longworth sees the Kid, he recognizes him as the Count's secretary and realizes that Hawkes and Sylvia are his criminal accomplices.

On the way to the police station, the Kid escapes from his captors. He meets up with Hawkes and Sylvia and they decide to hide in Longworth's cabin. Guessing where they have gone, Longworth goes to his cabin, where the gang takes him prisoner.

At the cabin, the three jewel thieves grow increasingly mistrustful of one another. As Hawkes sows division between Sylvia and the Kid, Longworth looks on in amusement. Hawkes and the Kid start fighting, with the Kid being badly injured.

At this point, Sylvia and Roy discover that they are brother and sister and that it was Hawkes who betrayed their father. Hawkes flees the cabin, but dies from an accident in the woods. When the police break into the cabin, Longworth assures them that everything is OK, that the robbery was "just an experiment" and that he and the jewelry are safe. At the end of the film, Longworth tells Sylvia that all four of them have been cat's-paws, or dupes, of fate.

== Cast ==
- Priscilla Dean as Sylvia Donovan
- Matt Moore as Dick Longworth
- Raymond Griffith as Roy Donovan
- Wallace Beery as Count Donelli/Hawkes
- Alfred Allen as Mike Donovan
- Emmett King as Bishop Vail, Chessplayer (uncredited)
- Lillian Langdon as Party Hostess (uncredited)
- Eric Mayne as Party Host (uncredited)
- Robert Page as Policeman at Mike Donovan shooting (uncredited)

== Theme ==
In White Tiger, Browning, a former magician, provides an exposé of the “mystifying mechanics” of the famous chess-playing automaton widely exhibited in late 18th and early 19th century Europe and America. The automaton fashioned to represent a Turkish chess master was an often convincing—though entirely fraudulent—representation of artificial intelligence: the device was actually operated by a human chess expert concealed within the cabinet below the chess board.Browning, a great admirer of Edgar Allan Poe, combined Poe's famous 1836 essay on the hoax with the author's fascination with tales of mystery and the macabre.

The protagonists in White Tiger use the “baffling” device to gain entrance to a wealthy estate and execute a jewel heist. In exposing the fraud, Browning violates a precept of the magician's code of ethics: to never reveal the mechanics of an illusion.

== Bibliography ==
- Eaker, Alfred. 2016. Tod Browning Retrospective Retrieved 26 February 2021.
- Sobchack, Vivian. 2006. "The Films of Tod Browning: An Overview Long Past" in The Films of Tod Browning, editor Bernd Herzogenrath, 2006 Black Dog Publishing. London. pp. 21–39. ISBN 1-904772-51-X
- Solomon, Matthew. 2006. "Staging Deception: Theatrical Illusionism in the Browning Films of the 1920s" in The Films of Tod Browning, editor Bernd Herzogenrath, 2006 Black Dog Publishing. London. pp. 49–67 ISBN 1-904772-51-X
