= Mechanical Turk =

Chess-playing automaton hoax (1770–1854)

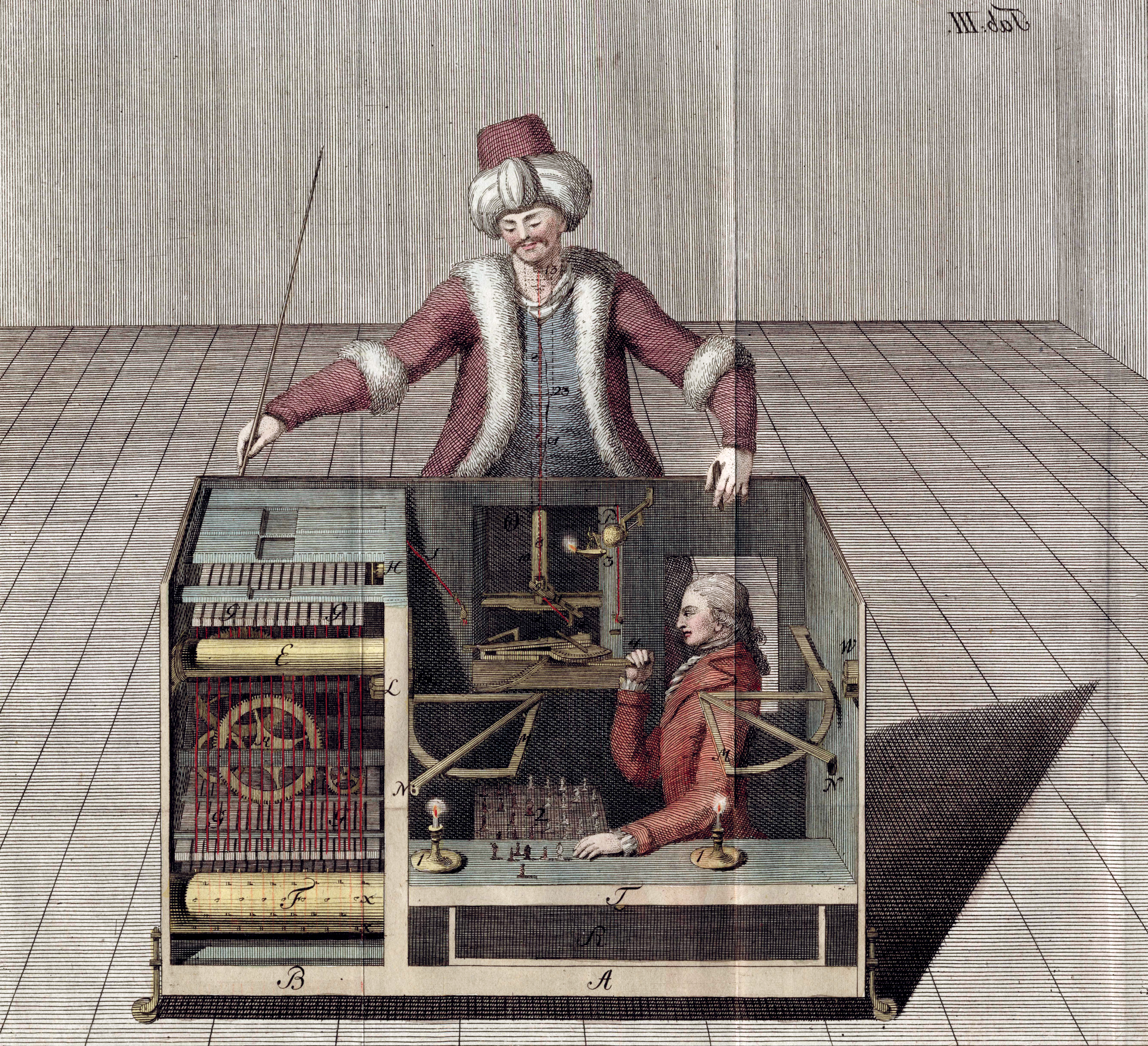
A cross-section of the Mechanical Turk, showing how Joseph Racknitz thought the operator sat inside as he played his opponent. Racknitz was wrong about both the operator's position and the dimensions of the automaton.

The Mechanical Turk (German: Schachtürke, lit. 'chess Turk'), also known as the Automaton Chess Player or simply the Turk (Hungarian: A Török), was a chess-playing machine first displayed in 1770, which appeared to be able to play a strong game of chess autonomously, but whose pieces were in reality moved via levers and magnets by a chess master hidden in its lower cavity. The machine was toured and exhibited for 84 years as an automaton, and continued giving occasional exhibitions until 1854, when it was destroyed in a fire. In 1857, an article published by the owner's son provided the first full explanation of the mechanism, which had been widely suspected to be a hoax but never accurately described while the machine still existed.

Constructed by Wolfgang von Kempelen to impress Empress Maria Theresa, the Turk won most games, including those against statesmen such as Napoleon Bonaparte and Benjamin Franklin. It was purchased in 1804 by Johann Nepomuk Mälzel, who continued to exhibit it. Chess masters who operated it over this later period included Johann Allgaier, Boncourt, Aaron Alexandre, William Lewis, Jacques Mouret and William Schlumberger, but its operators during Kempelen's original tour remain unknown. The device could also perform the knight's tour, a puzzle that required the player to move a knight to visit every square of a chessboard exactly once.

== Construction ==
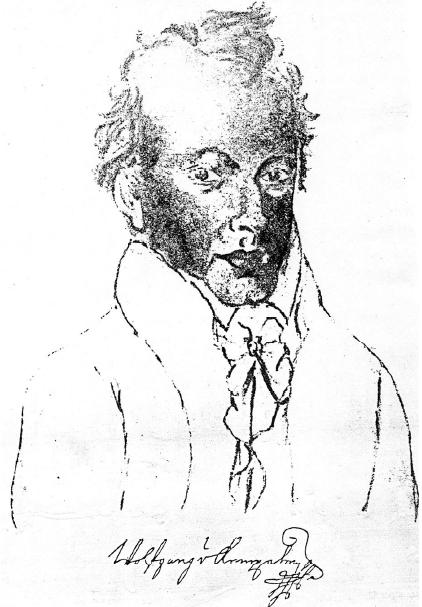
A signed charcoal self-portrait of Kempelen, who constructed the Turk

A performance in 1769 by the French illusionist François Pelletier at the court of Empress Maria Theresa in Schönbrunn Palace prompted Wolfgang von Kempelen to promise to return to the Palace within a year with an invention that would surpass Pelletier's illusions.

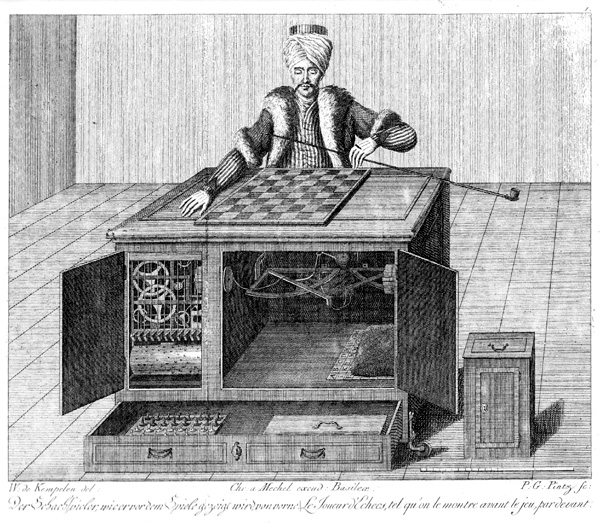
A copper engraving of the Turk, showing the open cabinet and working parts. A ruler at bottom right provides scale. Windisch describes the engravings as based on drawings "done by M. de Kempelen himself, for M. de Mechell, and which consequently cannot fail of being faithful and exact".

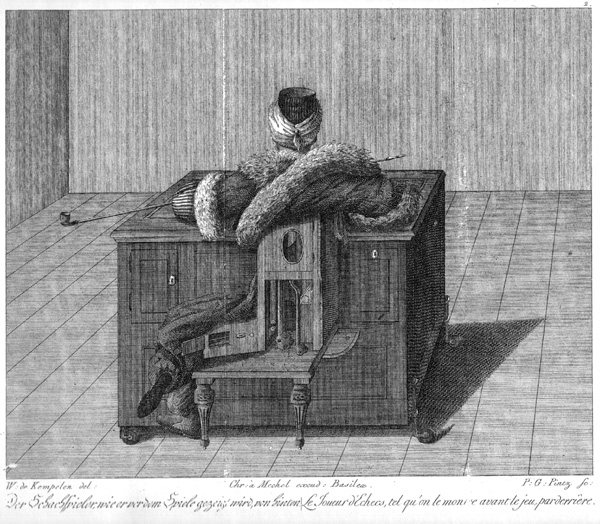
An engraving of the Turk from Karl Gottlieb von Windisch's 1784 book Inanimate Reason

The result was the Automaton Chess Player, later known as the Turk, which Kempelen brought to a working state within 1769 and completed in early 1770. (Note: Sources disagree on the timing. It seems widely accepted that the promise was made some time in 1769 and the unveiling for Maria Theresa in 1770; outliers include "[Kempelen] built a chess-playing automaton in the late 1760s", and "Kempelen first began to show the Chess Player in Vienna and then at his home in Pressburg (now Bratislava) in 1769.") The machine consisted of a life-sized model of a human head and torso, with a black beard and grey eyes, and dressed in Ottoman robes and a turban – "the traditional costume", according to the technology writer Tom Standage, "of an oriental sorcerer". Its left arm held a long Ottoman smoking pipe when at rest, while its right lay on a cabinet that was "three feet and a half long, two feet deep, and two and a half feet high". (Note: As Mitchell only specifies these dimensions to the nearest half-foot, metric versions can only be precise to the nearest multiple of 15 centimetres; thus very roughly 105 cm × 60 cm × 75 cm.) Placed on the top of the cabinet was a chessboard. The front of the cabinet consisted of three doors, an opening and a drawer, which could be opened to reveal a red and white ivory chess set.

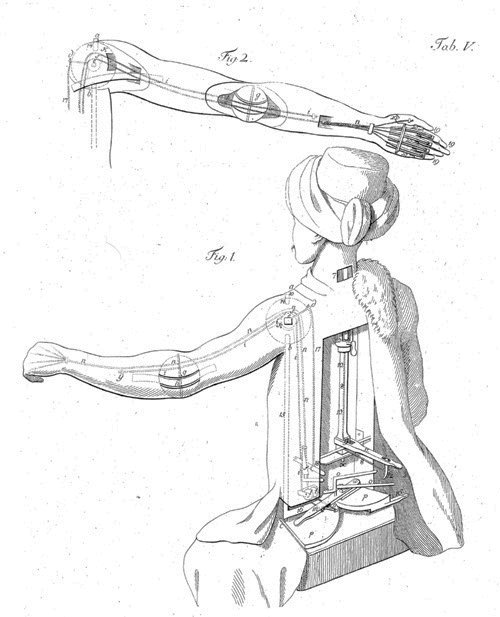
An illustration of the workings of the model. The various parts were directed by a human via interior levers and machinery. This is a distorted representation based on Racknitz's calculations, showing a design incompatible with the actual dimensions of the machine.

The interior had complications designed to mislead observers. When opened on the left, the front doors of the cabinet exposed gears and cogs resembling clockwork. The section was designed so that if the back doors of the cabinet were open at the same time one could see through the machine. The other side of the cabinet did not house machinery; instead it contained a red cushion and some removable parts, as well as brass structures. This too was designed to provide a clear line of vision through the machine. Underneath the robes of the Ottoman model, two other doors were hidden. These also exposed clockwork machinery and provided a similarly unobstructed view through the machine. The design allowed the presenter of the machine to open every available door to the public, to maintain the illusion of a purely clockwork mechanism.

Neither the clockwork visible on the left side of the machine nor the drawer that housed the chess set extended fully to the rear of the cabinet; they instead went only one-third of the way. A sliding seat was also installed, allowing the operator inside to move from place to place and thus evade observation as the presenter opened various doors. The sliding of the seat caused dummy machinery to slide into its place to further conceal the person inside the cabinet.

The chessboard on the top of the cabinet was thin enough to allow magnetic attraction. Each chess piece had a small, strong magnet attached to its base, and when placed on the board it would attract a magnet attached to a string under its place on the board. This allowed the operator inside the machine to see which pieces moved where on the chessboard. The underside of the chessboard was marked with squares numbered 1 to 64, helping the operator to see which places on the board were affected by a player's move. The internal magnets were positioned so that outside magnetic forces would not influence them, and Kempelen would often allow a large magnet to sit at the side of the board in an attempt to show that the machine was not influenced by magnetism.

As a further means of misdirection, the Turk came with a small wooden coffin-like box that the presenter would place on the top of the cabinet. Johann Nepomuk Mälzel, a later owner of the machine, did not use the box, but Kempelen often peered into it during play, suggesting that it controlled some aspect of the machine. Some believed the box to have supernatural power; Karl Gottlieb von Windisch wrote in his 1784 book Inanimate Reason that "[o]ne old lady, in particular, who had not forgotten the tales she had been told in her youth ... went and hid herself in a window seat, as distant as she could from the evil spirit, which she firmly believed possessed the machine."

The interior contained a pegboard chessboard connected by something like a pantograph to the model's left arm. The metal pointer on the pantograph moved over the interior chessboard and would simultaneously move the arm of the Turk over the chessboard on the cabinet. The range of motion allowed the operator to move the Turk's arm up and down, while turning the lever would open and close the Turk's hand, allowing it to grasp the pieces on the board. The board and mechanism were visible to the operator by candlelight. Other parts of the machinery made a clockwork sound when the Turk made a move, further adding to the machinery illusion; and the Turk could make various facial expressions. A voice box was added following the Turk's acquisition by Mälzel, allowing the machine to say "Échec!" (French for "Check!") during games.

The operator inside the machine had tools to assist in communicating with the presenter. Two brass discs equipped with numbers were positioned opposite each other on the inside and outside of the cabinet. A rod rotated the discs to a desired number, which acted as a code between the two.

== Exhibition ==
The Turk made its debut in 1770 at Schönbrunn Palace, about six months after Pelletier's act. Kempelen addressed the court, presenting what he had built, and began the demonstration of the machine and its parts. Kempelen began every showing of the Turk by opening the doors and drawers of the cabinet, allowing members of the audience to inspect the machine. He would then announce that the machine was ready for a challenger.

Kempelen insisted that the Turk would use the white pieces and have the first move (as the convention that White moves first was not yet established, these were not redundant to say). Between moves, the Turk kept its left arm on the cushion. It could nod twice if it threatened its opponent's queen and three times upon placing the king in check. If an opponent made an illegal move, the Turk would shake its head, move the piece back and make its own move, thus forcing a forfeit of its opponent's move. Louis Dutens, a traveller who observed a showing of the Turk, "attempted to practice a small deception, by giving the Queen the move of a Knight, but my mechanic opponent was not to be so imposed on; he took up my Queen and replaced her in the square she had been removed from". Kempelen made it a point to traverse the room during the match, and invited observers to bring magnets and iron bars to the cabinet to test whether the machine operated via a lodestone.

The knight's tour, as demonstrated by the Turk. The closed loop allows the tour to be completed from any starting point.

The first person to play against the Turk was Ludwig von Cobenzl, an Austrian courtier at the palace. Along with other challengers that day, he was quickly defeated, with observers of the match stating that the machine played aggressively and typically beat its opponents within thirty minutes.

Another part of the machine's exhibition was the completion of the knight's tour, a famed puzzle requiring the player to move a knight around a chessboard, visiting each square once along the way. While most experienced chess players of the time still struggled with this, the Turk could complete the tour without any difficulty from any starting point thanks to a pegboard marked with a closed-loop solution (a "reentrant tour"). Furthermore, the Turk could converse with spectators using a letterboard. The operator during the period when Kempelen presented the machine at Schönbrunn Palace, whose identity is unknown, was able to do this in English, French and German. Carl Friedrich Hindenburg, a mathematician, kept a record of the conversations during the Turk's time in Leipzig and published it in 1784. Topics of questions put to and answered by the Turk included its age, marital status and secret workings.

== European tour ==
Following word of its debut, interest in the machine grew across Europe. However, Kempelen avoided exhibiting the Turk, often lying about its repair status to prospective challengers. Von Windisch wrote that Kempelen "refused to gratify his friends, and many curious people of different countries, who wished to see this boasted machine, under a pretence that it had received damage by being removed from place to place". In the decade following its debut at Schönbrunn Palace, the Turk only played one opponent, Robert Murray Keith, a Scottish diplomat, and Kempelen went as far as dismantling the Turk entirely following the pair of games. He was quoted dismissing the invention as a mere trifle, (Note: C'est une bagatelle qui n'est pas sans merite du coté du mécanisme, mais les effets n'en paroissent si merveilleux que par la hardiesse de l'idée, & par l'heureux choix des moyens employés pour faire illusion. ('It is a trifle that mechanically is not without merit, but the effects only appear so marvelous because of the boldness of the idea, and the happy choice of means employed to create the illusion.')) as he was not pleased with its popularity and preferred to continue work on machines that replicated human speech.

In 1781, Kempelen was ordered by Emperor Joseph II to reconstruct the Turk and deliver it to Vienna for a state visit from Grand Duke Paul of Russia and his wife. The appearance was so successful that the Grand Duke suggested a tour of Europe for the Turk, a request to which Kempelen reluctantly agreed.

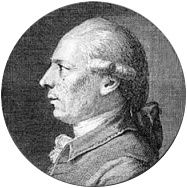
François-André Danican Philidor won a match against the Turk in Paris in 1783.

The Turk began its European tour in April 1783, in France. A stop at Versailles beginning on 17 April preceded an exhibition in Paris, where it lost a match to the Duke of Bouillon. Upon arrival in Paris in May, it was displayed to the public and played a variety of opponents, including a lawyer named Mr Bernard, one of five French players regarded as of second rank. Demands increased for a match with François-André Danican Philidor, who with Legall de Kermeur was considered the best chess player of his time. Moving to the Café de la Régence, the machine played many of the most skilled players, often losing (e.g. against Bernard and Verdoni), until securing a match with Philidor at the Académie des Sciences. While Philidor won his match with the Turk, Philidor's son noted that his father called it "his most fatiguing game of chess ever". The Turk's final game in Paris was against Benjamin Franklin, then the American ambassador to France. Franklin reportedly enjoyed the game with the Turk and remained interested in the machine for the rest of his life, keeping a copy of Philip Thicknesse's book The Speaking Figure and the Automaton Chess Player, Exposed and Detected in his personal library.

Following his tour of Paris, Kempelen moved the Turk to London, where it was exhibited daily for five shillings. Thicknesse was a sceptic and sought out the Turk in an attempt to expose its inner workings. While he respected Kempelen as "a very ingenious man", he asserted that the Turk was an elaborate hoax with a small child inside the machine, describing the machine as "a complicated piece of clockwork ... which is nothing more, than one, of many other ingenious devices, to misguide and delude the observers". In a popular book first published in 1784, and largely devoted to the tricks of Joseph Pinetti, Henri Decremps has "Van Estin" (a fictionalized version of Kempelen) attribute the operation of "an automaton chess player, similar to the one shewn at Paris and Vienna, by a German mechanick" to "a dwarf, a famous chess player, who was hidden in the commode".

After a year in London, Kempelen and the Turk travelled to Leipzig, stopping in various European cities along the way. From Leipzig, they went to Dresden, where Joseph Friedrich Freiherr von Racknitz viewed the machine and published his findings with illustrations showing how he believed it operated. They then moved to Amsterdam, after which Kempelen is said to have accepted an invitation to the Sanssouci palace in Potsdam. Frederick is said to have enjoyed the Turk so much that he paid a large sum to Kempelen in exchange for its secrets. Frederick never divulged these but was reportedly disappointed to learn how the machine worked. However, this story is apocryphal: there is no evidence of the Turk's encounter with Frederick, the first mention of which comes in the early 19th century, by which time the Turk was incorrectly said to have played against George III of Great Britain. It seems most likely that the machine stayed dormant at Schönbrunn Palace for over two decades, although Kempelen attempted unsuccessfully to sell it in the final years before his death at 70 on 26 March 1804.

== Mälzel ==
Following the death of Kempelen, the Turk remained unexhibited until 1805, when Kempelen's son decided to sell it to Johann Nepomuk Mälzel, a Bavarian musician with an interest in machines and devices. Mälzel, whose successes included patenting a form of metronome, had tried to buy the Turk before Kempelen's death. That attempt failed, owing to Kempelen's asking price of 20,000 francs; his son sold the machine to Mälzel for half this sum. On acquiring the Turk, Mälzel learned how it worked and returned it to working order. His goal was to make explaining the Turk a greater challenge. The completion of this task took ten years, during which the Turk still made appearances, most notably with Napoleon Bonaparte.

In 1809, Napoleon I of France arrived at Schönbrunn Palace to play the Turk. The details of the encounter have been published over the years in numerous accounts, among which even those by Silas Mitchell and George Allen (see below) are contradictory (Allen's being the more plausible). According to Bradley Ewart, it is believed that the Turk sat at its cabinet, and Napoleon sat at a separate chess table. Napoleon's table was in a roped-off area and he was not allowed to cross into the Turk's area, with Mälzel crossing back and forth to make each player's move and allowing a clear view for the spectators. According to a brief eyewitness report, the Turk made a gesture with his hand to Napoleon before the start of the match. In a surprise move, Napoleon took the first turn instead of allowing the Turk to make the first move, as was usual; but Mälzel allowed the game to continue. Shortly thereafter, Napoleon attempted an illegal move. The Turk returned the piece to its original place and continued the game. Napoleon attempted the illegal move a second time, and the Turk responded by removing the piece from the board entirely and taking its turn. Napoleon then attempted the move a third time, the Turk responding with a sweep of its arm, knocking all the pieces off the board. This reportedly amused Napoleon, who then played a real game with the machine, completing nineteen moves before tipping over his king in surrender. Alternative versions of the story include playing the machine at a later time, playing one game with a magnet on the board, or playing a game with a shawl around the head and body of the Turk in an attempt to obscure its vision – all of them probably apocryphal, in contrast to the stories that he was a bad loser and often indulgently allowed to win by stronger opponents.

In 1811, Mälzel brought the Turk to Milan for a performance with Eugène de Beauharnais, Prince of Venice and Viceroy of Italy. Beauharnais enjoyed the machine so much that he offered to buy it from Mälzel. After some protracted bargaining, Beauharnais acquired the Turk for 30,000 francs – three times what Mälzel had paid – and kept it for four years. In 1815, Mälzel returned to Beauharnais in Munich and asked to buy back the Turk. There are differing accounts of the conditions of the sale. (Note: "[T]he sagacious Mr. Maelzel, who had already experienced some regret at parting with his protégé, requested the favour to be again reinstated in the charge, promising to pay Eugene the interest of the thirty thousand francs Mr. M. had pocketed. This proposition was graciously conceded by the gallant Beauharnois, and Maelzel thus had the satisfaction of finding he had made a tolerably good bargain, getting literally the money for nothing at all!") (Note: "The writer in the Palamède makes the result a kind of partnership in an exhibition-tour – the title of the Automaton was to remain in the princely owner, and Maelzel was to pay the interest of the original cost as his partner's fair proportion of the profits. But another account – current, I believe, at Munich – makes the transaction to have been a sale: Maelzel bought back the Automaton for the same thirty thousand francs, and was to pay for it out of the profits of his exhibitions – 'Provided, nevertheless', that Maelzel was not to leave the Continent to give such exhibitions. The latter account I believe to be the more correct one.")

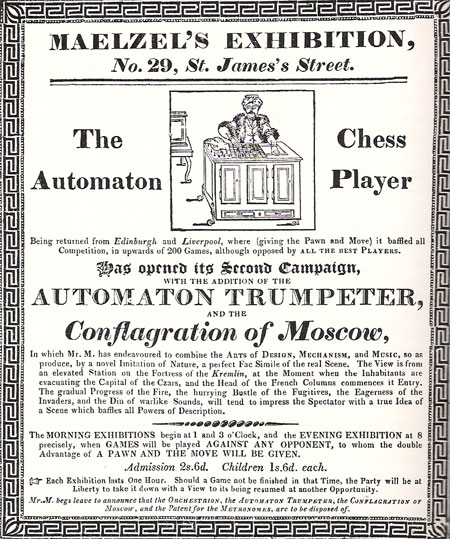
An advertisement for Mälzel's appearance with the Turk in London

As he left Bavaria with the Turk, Mälzel was once again "travelling showman of the wooden genius. Other automata were adopted into the family, and a handsome income was realised by their ingenious proprietor." He brought the Turk back to Paris, where Boncourt is thought to have been its primary operator, and where Mälzel made the acquaintance of many of the leading chess players at Café de la Régence. He stayed in France with the Turk until 1818, when he moved to London and held a number of performances with it and many of his other machines. In London, Mälzel and his act received much press, and he continued to improve the machine, ultimately installing a voice box so that it could say "Échec!" when placing a player in check.

In 1819, Mälzel took the Turk on a tour of the United Kingdom. There were several new developments in the act, such as allowing the opponent the first move and eliminating the king's bishop's pawn from the Turk's pieces. This pawn handicap created further interest in the Turk, and spawned a book by W. Hunneman chronicling these matches. Despite the handicap, the Turk (operated by Mouret at the time) ended up with forty-five victories, three losses and two stalemates.

== North American tour ==
The appearances of the Turk were profitable for Mälzel, and he continued by taking it and his other machines to the United States. In 1826, he opened an exhibition in New York (in the National Hotel, on 112 Broadway) that was very popular, averaging a hundred people in April, while in May "the hall was filled, and sometimes two hundred were turned away for lack of seats". It prompted many newspaper articles and anonymous threats of exposure of the hoax. Mälzel's problem was finding a talented operator for the machine, having trained an unknown woman in France before touring the United States. The "subsistence" in Paris of a former operator from Alsace, William Schlumberger "was both scanty and precarious"; and Mälzel induced him to come to Boston. As the Turk's main operator in the new world, Schlumberger "considered himself to have been fairly and kindly treated by Maelzel, and remained faithfully attached to his person and his interests to the last".

Upon Schlumberger's arrival, the Turk debuted in Boston, in the Julien Hall. Mälzel claimed that "the players of Boston are at least equal to those of New York" and promised that in Boston the Turk would offer to play not only endgames but also full games. The Turk was exhibited in Boston for several weeks, and the tour moved to Philadelphia for nearly three months, during which period it "lost a full game over the course of two exhibitions to a 'Mrs. Fisher', described in the front-page Baltimore Gazette headline as a 'Lady' of the city". Following Philadelphia, the Turk moved to Baltimore, where it played for several months, losing a game against the 89-year-old Charles Carroll, a signatory of the Declaration of Independence.

Mälzel continued with exhibitions around the United States until 1828, when he took some time off and visited Europe, returning in 1829. Throughout the 1830s, he continued to tour the United States. In Richmond, Virginia, the Turk was observed by Edgar Allan Poe, writing for the Southern Literary Messenger. Poe's "Maelzel's chess-player", published in April 1836 (and owing much to a book by David Brewster published in 1832), is the most famous essay on the Turk, even though many of its hypotheses were incorrect: (Note: One was that a chess-playing machine must always win: "The Automaton does not invariably win the game. Were the machine a pure machine this would not be the case – it would always win. The principle being discovered by which a machine can be made to play a game of chess, an extension of the same principle would enable it to win a game; a farther extension would enable it to win all games – that is, to beat any possible game of an antagonist. A little consideration will convince any one that the difficulty of making a machine beat all games, is not in the least degree greater, as regards the principle of the operations necessary, than that of making it beat a single game.") little or nothing else written on the same subject can "approach [its] literary brilliance". By this time, frequent exhibition of the Turk and publication of numerous descriptions, however mistaken, of its workings and human agency, had reduced interest in it. The star attraction among Mälzel's exhibits was now the highly dramatic "Conflagration of Moscow". Mälzel travelled farther in 1836–37 – to Pittsburgh, Cincinnati, Louisville, and New Orleans in the United States; and to Havana – and back to Philadelphia, where he spent more time preparing his Moscow diorama.

In November 1837 Mälzel took the Turk on his second tour to Havana. While in Cuba, Schlumberger died of yellow fever in February 1838, leaving Mälzel without an operator or, as the other members of his company now deserted him, any other assistant. A broken man, deeply in debt and drinking heavily, Mälzel died at sea in July 1838 at the age of 65 during his return trip, leaving his machinery with the ship's captain.

== Later years ==
On the return of the ship on which Mälzel had died, his various machines, including the Turk, fell into the hands of the businessman John Ohl, a friend of his. Ohl attempted to auction off the Turk; but, owing to low bidding, ultimately bought it himself for $400 (equivalent to $12,000 in 2025), and less than half the winning bid for the "Panorama of Moscow", as an investment. (Note: Mälzel exhibited two panoramas (building the second after selling the first). The earlier one was commonly called the "Conflagration of Moscow", but formally "the mechanical panorama of the Conflagration [or Burning] of Moscow"; the later one often called the "Panorama of Moscow".) Only when John Kearsley Mitchell – from Philadelphia, Edgar Allan Poe's personal physician, long deeply curious about the Turk – approached Ohl did the Turk change hands again. However, what Mitchell received turned out to be incomplete:

The five crates were found to contain pieces of Maelzel's other automata ... mixed in with the components of the Turk, several pieces of which were also missing and had to be retrieved from other boxes in Ohl's warehouse at Lombard Street Wharf. The Turk had lost its clothes, legs, pipe, and part of its head; a list drawn up by Mitchell of "things to be found and looked for" also included the cabinet doors, castors, and chessmen.

Mitchell formed a club to restore the Turk for public appearances, completing the work in 1840.

As interest in the Turk continued, Mitchell and his club deposited it (Note: Newer accounts that write of a donation but do not specify a source for this. However: "[The Philadelphia Museum's] Record Book, Aug., 1840 records 'the celebrated Automaton Chess-player, formerly the property of Mr. Maelzel. Deposited by a number of Gentlemen who united in its purchase'"; "the Android was boxed up, and placed on a back stairway of the building known as the Chinese Museum"; "The stockholders decided to deposit the Automaton in this building".) to the Philadelphia Museum (founded by Charles Willson Peale), the ground floor of whose building – "at Ninth and George (now Sansom) Streets" – had since its opening in December 1838 been occupied by Nathan Dunn's Chinese Museum.

Although the Turk still occasionally gave performances – and for that on 4 December 1840 it was advertised as "[having] been seen by more eyes than any terrestrial object ever exhibited" – these were devoid of professional showmanship and had little appeal. It was eventually relegated to a back corner of the museum and forgotten.

Dunn's entire Chinese collection left Philadelphia for good in December 1841; but the Chinese Museum remained "the popular, but not accurate, name given to the whole building". As for the Philadelphia Museum, Edmund Peale (a grandson of the founder) bought the collection in 1845; he then quickly moved it into "the former Masonic Hall in Chestnut Street above Seventh ... All was ready by January 1846." The Chinese Museum building on George Street became the place where "[all Philadelphia society's] great public meetings came to be held as a matter of course".

On 5 July 1854, a fire that had started at the National Theatre reached the Museum and destroyed the Turk. Mitchell's son Silas Mitchell arrived, but too late: he believed he had heard "through the struggling flames. ... the last words of our departed friend, the sternly whispered, oft repeated syllables, échec! échec!!"

== Publication of the mechanism ==
According to James Cook, by the mid-1820s "hundreds, if not thousands, of 'approaches' had been made toward discovering the secret [of the mechanical Turk], many of which were actually very close to the answer". The young Robert Willis (later a mechanical engineer and architectural historian) carefully observed Mälzel's exhibitions of the Turk, and in an 1821 booklet summarily dismissed some earlier theories: "[I]t has been suggested that [Mälzel] might touch certain springs, or pull 'a wire not much thicker than a hair', or be furnished with a powerful magnet. But such conjectures are unworthy of serious refutation". (Note: This may allude to what is said in a "widely quoted and reprinted" booklet published two years earlier: "[T]he action of a wire or piece of catgut, not much thicker than a hair, would be sufficient to guide [the arm and hand] in any direction". Observations on the Automaton Chess Player, Now Exhibited in London, at 4, Spring Gardens. By an Oxford Graduate. London: J. Hatchard. 1819. p. 31 – via Internet Archive. Standage also pooh-poohs such "feeble speculations", calling the writer "hardly a credit to his university".) Willis noted anomalies such as the lack of correlation between the degree to which the clockwork was wound up and the number of moves the Turk then executed. He showed how "any person, well skilled in the game, and not exceeding the ordinary bulk or stature, may secretly animate the Automaton" – even if with some inaccuracies, notably that "[the operator's] head being above the table, he will see the chess-board through the waistcoat, as easily as through a veil".

In 1826, the Massachusetts physician Gamaliel Bradford published a booklet, The History and Analysis of the Supposed Automaton Chess Player of M. de Kempelen, in which he considered a number of ways in which the Turk might be directed by Mälzel or another person outside it or by an operator within it. Even if not an automaton, concluded Bradford, "it must be admitted to be one of the most ingenious, & completely successful contrivances, which has ever been offered to the public".

The hoax was exposed in 1827 during a match in Baltimore when the unusually high temperature rendered the operator, William Schlumberger, faint. He signalled to Mälzel to stop the game; but before Mälzel could act on this, Schlumberger, in desperation, escaped from the cabinet of the Turk. That he did so was not entirely clear to the audience; however, two teens enjoying a free view of the performance from a nearby rooftop saw and understood what had happened. One told his father, who told the Baltimore Gazette, which published an article on its front page saying that "This ingenious contrivance ... has at length been discovered by accident to be merely the case in which a human agent has always been concealed, when exhibited to an audience." (Note: "The chess-player discovered". Gazette (Baltimore). 1 June 1827.) Although Mälzel withdrew the Turk from his travelling show (which continued with "The Conflagration of Moscow" and "The Trumpeter"), the Gazette story had little impact, with George Allen writing:

[N]obody credited the pretended discovery. The world had set its heart upon believing that the secret, which had puzzled mechanicians, mathematicians, and monarchs, for more than half a century, was something quite too deep to be penetrated by a couple of boys. The National Intelligencer, of Washington ... sagaciously treated the Gazette article as having emanated from Maelzel himself – "the tale of a discovery was but a clever device of the proprietor to keep alive the interest of the community in his exhibition".

Lesser newspapers, suggests Allen, were too timid to contradict the prestigious Intelligencer and Mälzel's business was little impacted.

Of the many contemporary books and articles written about the mechanism of the Turk, most were inaccurate and drew incorrect inferences. An exception was "Automate joueur d'échecs", published in the popular magazine Le Magasin pittoresque in 1834, and widely believed to have been informed, or perhaps even written, by one of the Turk's operators, Jacques Mouret. In 1836, Mathieu de Tournay based a more detailed description of the Turk for the chess magazine Le Palamède on the Magasin pittoresque article.

It was not until Silas Mitchell's article for The Chess Monthly in 1857 that the secret was fully revealed. Mitchell, son of the final private owner of the Turk, wrote that "perhaps no secret was ever kept as the Turk's has been. Guessed at, in part, many times, no one of the several explanations in our possession has ever practically solved this amusing puzzle". As the Turk had been lost to fire, Mitchell felt that there were "no longer any reasons for concealing from the amateurs of chess, the solution of this ancient enigma". A biographical history about the Chess-player and Mälzel was also presented in Willard Fiske's The Book of the First American Chess Congress (1859). The account, "The Automaton Chess-Player in America", was written by the academic George Allen in the form of a letter to William Lewis, a former operator of the Turk.

In 1859, a letter published in the Philadelphia Sunday Dispatch by William F. Kummer, who worked as an operator under John Mitchell, revealed how a candle inside the cabinet had provided light for the operator. A series of tubes led from the lamp to the turban of the Turk for ventilation. Smoke rising from the turban would be disguised by that from the other candelabra where the game was played. The American Chess Magazine published an account in 1889 of the Turk's match with Napoleon. The story was basically a review of previous accounts, and a substantive account only came in 1947, when Chess Review published a two-part article by Kenneth Harkness and Jack Straley Battell that provided a full history and description of the Turk, complete with new diagrams that synthesized information from previous publications. An article written in 1960 for American Heritage by Ernest Wittenberg provided new diagrams describing how the operator sat inside the cabinet.

Not all the 20th-century accounts were advances. Henry A. Davidson's 1945 book A Short History of Chess takes seriously Poe's erroneous notion that the player sat inside the Turk figure. (Note: "[Operation from within the cabinet] seems unlikely, however, since knowing that a square was occupied could not tell the unseeing operator which piece rested on that square. Poe's explanation is more credible. He thinks that during the game, the player sat inside the figure and looked at the board through the gauze bosom of the Turk.") In his The Machine Plays Chess? (1978), Alex G. Bell opts for "a mind-reading act". (Note: "It seems to me extremely unlikely that it was necessary or desirable for the chess master to actually be inside the machine himself. It is far more likely that the operator was a trained boy (or very small adult) who followed the directions of the chess player who was hidden elsewhere on the stage or in the theatre – the Turk was a 'mind-reading' act.") Charles Michael Carroll's The Great Chess Automaton (1975) focuses more on the studies of the Turk. Bradley Ewart's Chess: Man vs. Machine (1980) discusses the Turk as well as other purported chess-playing automata. It was not until the creation of Deep Blue, IBM's computer that in 1997 defeated the world (human) champion, (Note: "[T]he world champion found himself humbled by a 1.4-ton heap of silicone [sic] in a victory for IBM's Deep Blue that marks a milestone in the progress of artificial intelligence. It is a depressing day for humankind in general.") that interest increased again, and two more books devoted to the Turk were published: Gerald Levitt's The Turk, Chess Automaton and Tom Standage's The Turk.

== Legacy ==
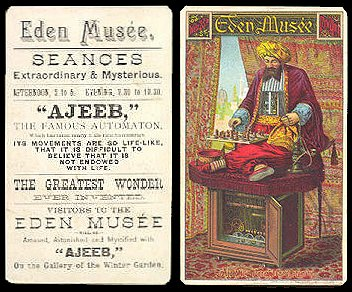
An advertisement for an exhibition of Ajeeb, an imitation of the Turk

The Turk's popularity and mystery inspired a number of inventions and imitations. The first appeared while Mälzel was in Baltimore. Created by two brothers named Walker, the "American Chess Player" made its debut in May 1827 in New York. Mälzel viewed the machine and attempted to buy it, but his offer of a 15-game match between the two machines for a stake of $3,000 was declined, as was his offer to buy the machine. The American Chess Player toured for a number of years but never received the fame that Mälzel's machine did and eventually fell into obscurity. Others included Ajeeb, or "The Egyptian", an American imitation built by Charles Hopper that President Grover Cleveland played in 1885; and Mephisto, advertised as the "most famous" machine, of which little is known.

In 1784 the Turk was visited in London by the prebendary Edmund Cartwright, who was so intrigued that he questioned whether it would be more difficult to construct a power loom than a device that would play chess. (Note: ". . . I controverted, however, the impracticability of [a weaving mill], by remarking that there had been lately exhibited in London an automaton figure which played at chess. 'Now you will not assert, gentlemen', said I, 'that it is more difficult to construct a machine that shall weave, than one which shall make all the variety of moves which are required in that complicated game'.") Cartwright would patent the prototype for a power loom within the year.

Genuine chess-playing automata did not emerge until 1912, when El Ajedrecista was built by Leonardo Torres Quevedo. It was exhibited at the new laboratory of Mécanique physique et expérimentale of the University of Paris, on boulevard Raspail, (Note: Although Jiménez states that El Ajedrecista appeared "during the Paris World Fair of 1914", no such world's fair took place.) and used electromagnets to win rook and king versus king endgames.

=== In literature and the arts ===
The Turk has inspired works of various kinds of fiction. An early example is Jean Paul's story Menschen sind Maschinen der Engel, written in 1785. Its narrator starts by saying that we humans are merely the furniture of the true inhabitants of the world, angels; and it is "obvious [that] our industriousness, which works against our happiness, is conducive to other beings' happiness, whose hands conduct ours as their tools". Chess-playing machines exemplify the building by machines (that is, people) of machines; of which the narrator's description culminates in a "deliberate confusion of chess-playing humans and chess-playing machines", leaving the reader "incessantly bewildered about the status of the story's actors (as well as the reader's own status) as machine or as human".

Fiction has also been passed off as fact. In 1859 an article in Littell's Living Age purported to be an account of the Turk from the celebrated French magician Jean Eugène Robert-Houdin; its content soon reappeared in Robert-Houdin's memoir. Its many errors ranged from mistaken dates to outright inventions, most conspicuously the story of "an officer by the name of Worousky" whose legs had been amputated after battle, but who was rescued by Kempelen and smuggled back to Russia inside the machine. (Note: In an otherwise appreciative preface, the book's editor does not hold back: "[Houdin's] account of M. de Kempelen's celebrated automaton chess-player (afterwards Maëlzel's) is entirely wrong. This remarkable piece of mechanism was constructed in 1769, and not in 1796; it was the Empress Maria-Theresa of Austria who played with it, and not Catherine II. of Russia; . . ." And the editor continues, with further corrections.) Standage sums it up: "Robert-Houdin's entire account must be dismissed as fiction." Paul Metzner remarks that "This story, contained in [Robert-Houdin's] very popular autobiography, seems to have revived interest in the Turk." The fiction was subsequently repeated as fact, notably in Encyclopædia Britannica: the 11th edition, and in other editions as well. (Note: "[I]n several editions of the Encyclopædia Britannica under the article 'White magic'." "The Encyclopædia Britannica, 14th edition, Vol. VI, however, accepts Robert-Houdin's account of the automaton as a fact, despite all the evidence against it. It also states that it was owned for a short time by Napoleon I; which, as we have seen, is untrue.")

This tale of concealing a Pole named Worousky within the Turk "had the legs its protagonist lacked". Sheryl N. Hamilton mentions "dramatic plays, at least three novels, and even a silent film" deriving from this fantasy of Robert-Houdin's. One such novel is Sheila E. Braine's The Turkish Automaton (1898). Another is Henry Dupuy-Mazuel's Le Joueur d'échecs (1926), published in English translation as both The Chess Player and The Devil Is an Empress. (Note: Although Borger, Furniss and Hamilton give Dupuy-Mazuel's first name as Henri, it was Henry according to the Bibliothèque nationale de France.) Plays include Jules Adenis and Octave Gastineau's La Czarine, first performed in 1868. The silent film deriving from Robert-Houdin's fictional version via Dupuy-Mazuel's is Raymond Bernard's feature The Chess Player (Le Joueur d'échecs, 1927), in which a young Polish nationalist on the run from the occupying Russians is hidden inside a chess-playing automaton.

There have also been derivatives independent of Robert-Houdin. Ambrose Bierce's 1899 short story "Moxon's Master" is a morbid tale about a chess-playing automaton that resembles the Turk, as described by Poe. Gene Wolfe's 1977 science fiction short story "The Marvelous Brass Chessplaying Automaton" is about a device very similar to the Turk. Robert Löhr's 2007 novel The Chess Machine (published in the UK as The Secrets of the Chess Machine) focuses on the man inside the machine, a dwarf named Tibor.

In the first of his Theses on the Philosophy of History (1940), philosopher and critic Walter Benjamin likened strict Marxist historiography to the Mechanical Turk: "one can imagine a philosophical counterpart to this device. The puppet called 'historical materialism' is to win all the time. It can easily be a match for anyone if it enlists the services of theology, which today, as we know, is wizened and has to keep out of sight."

Jane Irwin's webcomic and later graphic novel Clockwork Game: The Illustrious Career of a Chess-Playing Automaton is based on the Turk.

A film inspired by the Turk is Tod Browning's White Tiger (1923). Its three main characters, who find themselves partners in crime, include one who is both a "double-crossing hood" and a "genius at chess". Essential to the trio's scheme to make a killing is "the chess-playing Turk", whose cabinet serves to conceal either its operator or a burglar. There have been at least two television films based on the Turk. A 13-episode French–Italian–Austrian–Hungarian series, Les Évasions célèbres (Famous Escapes) was broadcast in France on ORTF in 1972 as well as elsewhere (e.g. East Germany in 1977). One 55-minute episode, Le Joueur d'échecs (Der Schachspieler), directed by Christian-Jaque, has Napoleon (Robert Manuel) encounter the automaton in Kempelen's castle, play against it, and lose. El jugador de ajedrez or Le Joueur d'échecs de Maelzel, a 54-minute television film produced in Mexico and France and directed by Juan Luis Buñuel, was first broadcast in 1981 as one of a series of films based on Poe. A chess-playing computer named "the Turk" is a plot device in the television series Terminator: The Sarah Connor Chronicles.

=== Reconstructions ===
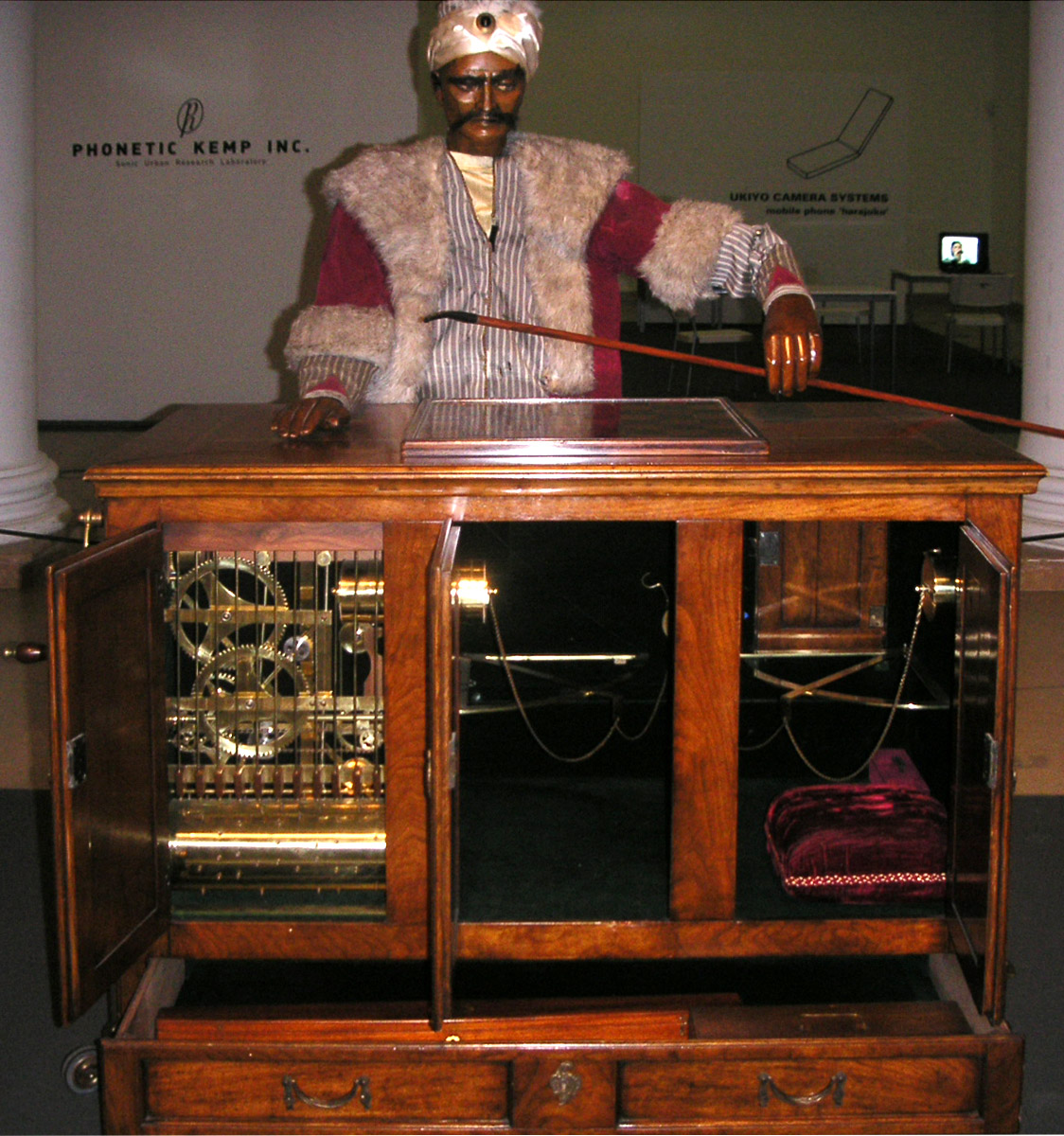
A 1980s reconstruction by John Gaughan

From 1984 to 1989, John Gaughan, an American manufacturer of equipment for magicians based in Los Angeles, spent $120,000 (equivalent to $370,000 in 2025) building his own version of Kempelen's machine. The machine uses the original chessboard, which had been stored separately and was not destroyed in the fire. The first public display of Gaughan's Turk was in November 1989 at the Los Angeles Conference on Magic History. The machine was presented much as Kempelen had presented the original, except that its opponent was a computer running a chess program.

At Heinz Nixdorf MuseumsForum, an information technology museum in Paderborn, Germany, researchers and engineers under Bernhard Fromme spent just over a year creating another replica, unveiling it in 2004; it has continued to be exhibited there since.

== Sources ==
- Adenis, Jules; Gastineau, Octave (1868). La Czarine: Drame en cinq actes et huit tableaux (in French). Paris: Michel Lévy. OCLC 1501208794 – via Google Books.
- Allen, George (1859). "The history of the automaton chess-player in America. A letter addressed to William Lewis Esq., London". The Book of the First American Chess Congress: Containing the Proceedings of That Celebrated Assemblage, Held in New York, in the Year 1857. By Fiske, Daniel Willard. New York: Rudd & Carleton. pp. 420–484. OCLC 1041560752 – via Internet Archive. (Signed by "G.A.", who Fiske identifies as George Allen in the preface to the book.)
- Anderson, Hephzibah (3 June 2007). "Confucius say: Do snap out of it". The Observer.
- Arrington, Joseph Earl (January 1960). "John Maelzel, master showman of automata and panoramas". The Pennsylvania Magazine of History and Biography. 84 (1). University of Pennsylvania Press: 56–92. JSTOR 20089262. Archived from the original on 14 June 2015.
- Ashenhurst, Thos. R. (1879). A Practical Treatise on Weaving and Designing of Textile Fabrics: With Chapters on the Principles of Construction of the Loom, Calculations and Colour (PDF). Bradford: T. Brear – via Internet Archive.
- Atkinson, George (1998). Chess and Machine Intuition. Exeter: Intellect. ISBN 978-0-5852-4481-5.
- Bell, Alex G. (1978). The Machine Plays Chess?. Oxford: Pergamon. ISBN 0-08-021221-2. (Also ISBN 0-08-021222-0.)
- Benjamin, Walter (1968). Illuminations. Translated by Zohn, Harry. New York: Schocken. ISBN 978-0-8052-0241-0 – via Internet Archive. (Translation of Über den Begriff der Geschichte, 1940.)
- Bierce, Ambrose (1910). "Moxon's master". Can Such Things Be?. The Collected Works of Ambrose Bierce. Vol. 3. New York: Neale. pp. 88–105 – via Internet Archive. (Originally published, as "A night at Moxon's", in 1899.)
- Borger, Lenny (2018). "Le Joueur d'échecs: The Chess Player: Raymond Bernard (Fr 1927)". Pordenone Silent Film Festival.
- [Bradford, Gamaliel] (1826). The History and Analysis of the Supposed Automaton Chess Player of M. de Kempelen. Boston: Hilliard, Gray. OCLC 4600718 – via Google Books.
- Braine, Sheila E. (1898). The Turkish Automaton: A Tale of the Time of Catherine the Great of Russia. London: Blackie. OCLC 221999603.
- Brewster, David (1842) [1832]. Letters on Natural Magic: Addressed to Sir Walter Scott, Bart. New York: Harper. pp. 243–255. OCLC 1181018238. Archived from the original on 6 April 2025 – via The Library of Congress.
- Charles, Ron (30 June 2007). "Checkmate". Washington Post.
- Clarke, John Algernon; Faur, G.; Maskelyne, John Nevil (1911). "Conjuring". Encyclopædia Britannica. Vol. 6 (11th ed.). pp. 943–950 – via Internet Archive.
- Cook, James W. (Winter 1995). "From the Age of Reason to the age of Barnum: The Great Automaton Chess-Player and the emergence of Victorian cultural illusionism". Winterthur Portfolio. 30 (4). University of Chicago Press: 231–257. doi:10.1086/wp.30.4.4618515. JSTOR 4618515.
- Cornog, Martha (1 June 2014). "Clockwork Game: The Illustrious Career of a Chess-Playing Automaton". Library Journal.
- Davidson, Henry A. (1981) [1949]. "Chap. 15: Chess charivari". A Short History of Chess. New York: David McKay. ISBN 9780679145509.
- [Decremps, Henri] (1790). The Conjurer Unmasked; Being a Clear and Full Explanation of All the Surprizing Performances Exhibited as Well in This Kingdom as on the Continent, by the Most Eminent and Dexterous Professors of Slight of Hand (3rd ed.). London: C. Stalker. OCLC 508884724 – via Internet Archive. (Translation of La Magie blanche dévoilée, 1784.)
- Döbbelt, Johannes (15 March 2025). "Scharade statt Rochade – der Schachtürke". Matinee, SWR Kultur (in German). Südwestrundfunk. Event occurs at 05:17.
- Dutens, Louis (January 1771). "A description of an automaton, which plays at chess. Presburg (in Hungary) July 24". The Gentleman's Magazine. pp. 26–27 – via Internet Archive. (Translation of À Presbourg, ce 24 juillet 1770, published in Mercure de France, circa October 1770.)
- Evans, Henry Ridgely (1939). Edgar Allan Poe and Baron von Kempelen's Chess-Playing Automaton. Kenton, Ohio: International Brotherhood of Magicians. OCLC 906097644 – via Edgar Allan Poe Society of Baltimore. (Other parts of this booklet: title page and table of contents; introduction; bibliography.)
- Ewart, Bradley (1980). Chess, Man vs. Machine. London: A. S. Barnes. ISBN 978-0-498-02167-1 – via Internet Archive.
- Fiske, Daniel Willard (1859). The Book of the First American Chess Congress: Containing the Proceedings of That Celebrated Assemblage, Held in New York, in the Year 1857. New York: Rudd & Carleton. OCLC 1041560752 – via Internet Archive.
- Furniss, Maureen (Spring 2004). "Le Joueur d'echecs/The Chess Player (review)". The Moving Image. 4 (1). University of Minnesota Press: 149–151. doi:10.1353/mov.2004.0007.
- Garmendia, Arturo (3 July 2018). "La dinastía Buñuel. Un despedida a Juan Luis" [The Buñuel dynasty: A farewell to Juan Luis]. Corre Camara (in Spanish).
- Haddad, John Rogers (2008). "China in miniature: Nathan Dunn's Chinese Museum". The Romance of China: Excursions to China in U.S. Culture, 1776–1876. New York: Columbia University Press. ISBN 9780231130943. Archived from the original on 3 March 2016 – via Gutenberg-e (American Historical Association and Columbia University Press). (Also ISBN 9780231504041.)
- Hamilton, Sheryl N. (2009). Impersonations: Troubling the Person in Law and Culture. Toronto: University of Toronto Press. ISBN 978-0-8020-9846-7.
- Hankins, Thomas L.; Silverman, Robert J. (1995). Instruments and the Imagination. Princeton, New Jersey: Princeton University Press. ISBN 978-0-691-02997-9.
- Harding, Luke; Barden, Leonard (12 May 1997). "Deep Blue win a giant step for computerkind". The Guardian.
- Harkness, Kenneth; Battell, Jack Straley (February–November 1947). "This made chess history". Chess Review.
- Higham, George (2024). Magic and Illusion in the Movies. Jefferson, North Carolina: McFarland. ISBN 978-1-4766-8325-6 – via Google Books.
- Hindenburg, Carl Friedrich (1784). Ueber den Schachspieler des Herrn von Kempelen: Nebst einer Abbildung und Beschreibung seiner Sprachmaschine [On Mr. von Kempelen's chess player: With an illustration and description of his language machine] (in German). Leipzig: Johann Gottfried Müllerschen Buchhandlung – via Münchener DigitalisierungsZentrum Digitale Bibliothek.
- Hooper, David; Whyld, Kenneth (1996) [1992]. The Oxford Companion to Chess (2nd ed.). Oxford: Oxford University Press. ISBN 978-0-19-280049-7.
- [Hunneman, W.] (1820). Chess. A Selection of Fifty Games, from Those Played by the Automaton Chess-Player, During Its Exhibition in London, in 1820, Taken Down, by Permission of Mr. Maelzel, at the Time They Were Played. London: The Exhibition Room, and A. Maxwell. OCLC 559305144 – via Hathitrust. (Credited to "W.H.", widely identified as W. Hunneman.)
- Jay, Ricky (2000). "The Automaton Chess Player, the invisible girl, and the telephone". Jay's Journal of Anomalies. Vol. 4, no. 4.
- Jean Paul (1927). "Menschen sind Maschinen der Engel" [Humans are machines of the angels]. In Berend, Eduard (ed.). Jean Pauls Sämtliche Werke: historisch-kritische Ausgabe, Part 2 (in German). Vol. 1. Weimar: Hermann Böhlaus Nachfolger. pp. 1028–1030. OCLC 945170335.
- Jiménez, Ramón (20 July 2004). "The rook endgame machine of Torres y Quevedo". ChessBase. Archived from the original on 25 January 2013.
- Kummer, William F. (February 1859). "Maelzel's automaton chess-player". Philadelphia Sunday Dispatch.
- Langford, David (2005). "Chess". In Westfahl, Gary (ed.). The Greenwood Encyclopedia of Science Fiction and Fantasy: Themes, Works, and Wonders. Vol. 1: Themes A–K. Westport, CT: Greenwood Press. pp. 112–114. ISBN 0-313-32951-6.
- Levitt, Gerald (2000). The Turk, Chess Automaton. Jefferson, North Carolina: McFarland. ISBN 978-0-7864-0778-1.
- Löhr, Robert (2007). The Chess Machine. Translated by Bell, Anthea. New York: Penguin Press. ISBN 978-1-59420-126-4 – via Internet Archive.
- Mackenzie, R. Shelton (1859). "Editor's preface". Memoirs of Robert-Houdin, Ambassador, Author, and Conjurer. Written by Himself. By Robert-Houdin, Jean-Eugène. Mackenzie, R. Shelton (ed.). Philadelphia: Geo. G. Evans. OCLC 3195434 – via Internet Archive.
- Metzner, Paul (1998). Crescendo of the Virtuoso: Spectacle, Skill, and Self-Promotion in Paris during the Age of Revolution. Berkeley: University of California Press. ISBN 9780520377400 – via UC Press E-Books Collection, 1982–2005. (Also ISBN 9780520206847 and ISBN 9780585053691.)
- Miller, Arthur M. (May 1932). "The influence of Edgar Allan Poe on Ambrose Bierce". American Literature. 4 (2): 130–150. doi:10.2307/2920282. JSTOR 2920282.
- Mitchell, S[ilas] W[eir] (January–February 1857). "The last of a veteran chess player". The Chess Monthly. Vol. 1. pp. 3–7, 40–45. hdl:2027/hvd.hn43vw; reprinted as Appendix L of Levitt 2000, pp. 236–240.
- Negele, Michael (2004). "The Turk at Paderborn – visiting an event on March 25th, 2004". Chess History and Literature Society.
- Nielsen, Wendy C. (2020). "Romantic tales of pseudo-automata: Jacques de Vaucanson and the chess-playing Turk in literature and culture". In Demson, Michael; Clason, Christopher R. (eds.). Romantic Automata: Exhibitions, Figures, Organisms. Transits: Literature, Thought & Culture, 1650–1850. Lewisburg, Pennsylvania: Bucknell University Press. pp. 87–105. ISBN 9781684481774. (Also ISBN 9781684481767, ISBN 9781684481781, ISBN 9781684481804.)
- Poe, Edgar Allan (1836). "Maelzel's chess-player". Southern Literary Messenger. Vol. 2, no. 5. pp. 318–326 – via University of Michigan Library Digital Collections. (Additionally available Archived 13 August 2018 at the Wayback Machine via the Edgar Allan Poe Society of Baltimore, Maryland.)
- Racknitz, Joseph Friedrich Freyherr zu (1789). Ueber den Schachspieler des Herrn von Kempelen und dessen Nachbildung [On Mr. von Kempelen's chess player and its replica] (in German). Leipzig: Joh. Gottl. Immanuel Breitkopf. OCLC 457435484 – via Google Books.
- Rice, Stephen Patrick (2004). Minding the Machine: Languages of Class in Early Industrial America. Berkeley: University of California Press. ISBN 978-0-520-22781-1.
- Riskin, Jessica (2016). The Restless Clock: A History of the Centuries-Long Argument over What Makes Living Things Tick. Chicago: University of Chicago Press. doi:10.7208/chicago/9780226303086.001.0001. ISBN 978-0-226-30292-8. (Also ISBN 978-0-226-52826-7, ISBN 978-0-226-30308-6.)
- Robert-Houdin, Jean-Eugène (1860). Memoirs of Robert-Houdin, Ambassador, Author, and Conjuror. Written by Himself (PDF). Translated by Wraxall, Lascelles (2nd ed.). London: Chapman and Hall. OCLC 940443301 – via Internet Archive.
- Scharf, John Thomas; Westcott, Thompson (1884). History of Philadelphia, 1609–1884. Vol. 2. Philadelphia: L. H. Everts. OCLC 1851563 – via Google Books.
- Schmitz, Peter (28 February 2004). "Heinz-Nixdorf-Museums-Forum rekonstruiert den 'Schachtürken'". Heise Online (in German).
- Sellers, Charles Coleman (1980). Mr. Peale's Museum: Charles Willson Peale and the First Popular Museum of Natural Science and Art. New York: W. W. Norton. ISBN 0-393-05700-3 – via Internet Archive.
- Standage, Tom (2002). The Turk: The Life and Times of the Famous Eighteenth-Century Chess-Playing Machine. New York: Walker. ISBN 978-0-8027-1391-9.
- [Thicknesse, Philip] (1794). The Speaking Figure and the Automaton Chess Player, Exposed and Detected. London: John Stockdale. OCLC 83389608 – via Google Books.
- Tournay, Mathieu-Jean-Baptiste Nioche de (15 May 1836). "La Vie et les aventures de l'automate joueur d'échecs" [The life and adventures of the automaton chess player]. Le Palamède. 1 (in French). Vol. 1, no. 3. pp. 81–87.
- [Twiss, Richard] (1787). Chess. London: Robinson and Egerton. OCLC 83525148 – via Internet Archive.
- Valin, Pierre (Autumn 1987). "Le Double Jeu de l'automate". Quaderni (in French). 2 (2): 45–55. doi:10.3406/quad.1987.1860.
- Vigneron, H[enri] (1914). "Les Automates" (PDF). La Nature. pp. 56–61. Archived (PDF) from the original on 27 December 2024 – via Cybernetic Zoo.
- Voskuhl, Adelheid (2007). "Motions and passions: Music-playing women automata and the culture of affect in late eighteenth-century Germany". In Riskin, Jessica (ed.). Genesis Redux: Essays in the History and Philosophy of Artificial Life. Chicago: University of Chicago Press. pp. 293–320. ISBN 978-0-226-72080-7. (Also ISBN 978-0-226-72081-4.)
- [Wairy, Louis Constant] (1895). Recollections of the Private Life of Napoleon. Translated by Clark, Walter – via Project Gutenberg. (Translation of Mémoires de Constant, premier valet de chambre de l'empereur sur la vie privée de Napoléon, sa famille, et sa cour, 1830.)
- [Walker, George] (June 1839). "Anatomy of the chess automaton". Fraser's Magazine for Town and Country. Vol. 19, no. 114. James Fraser. pp. 717–731 – via Internet Archive. (Credited to "G.W.", elsewhere identified as George Walker. (Cook 1995, p. 246, n. 36))
- [Willis, Robert] (1821). An Attempt to Analyse the Automaton Chess Player of Mr. de Kempelen. London: J. Booth. OCLC 315527733 – via Internet Archive.
- Windisch, Charles Gottlieb de (1784). Inanimate Reason; or, A Circumstantial Account of That Astonishing Piece of Mechanism, M. de Kempelen's Chess-Player . . . Translated from the Original Letters of M. Charles Gottlieb de Windisch. London: S. Bladon. OCLC 83370817 – via Google Books. (Translation of Briefe über den Schachspieler von Kempelen nebst drey Kupferstichen die diese berühmte Maschine vorstellen, 1783.)
- Wittenberg, Ernest (February 1960). "Échec!". American Heritage. Vol. 11, no. 2. Archived from the original on 22 December 2007. (With a number of what appear to be OCR errors; without the diagrams.)
- Wolfe, Gene (1977). "The marvelous brass chessplaying automaton". In Carr, Terry (ed.). Universe 7. Garden City, New York: Doubleday. pp. 113–133. ISBN 978-0-385-11414-1 – via Internet Archive. Reprinted: Saberhagen, Fred; Saberhagen, Joan, eds. (1982). "The marvelous brass chessplaying automaton". Pawn to Infinity. New York: Ace Books. pp. 3–25. ISBN 0-441-65482-7 – via Internet Archive.
