= Maelzel's Chess Player =

Essay by Edgar Allan Poe

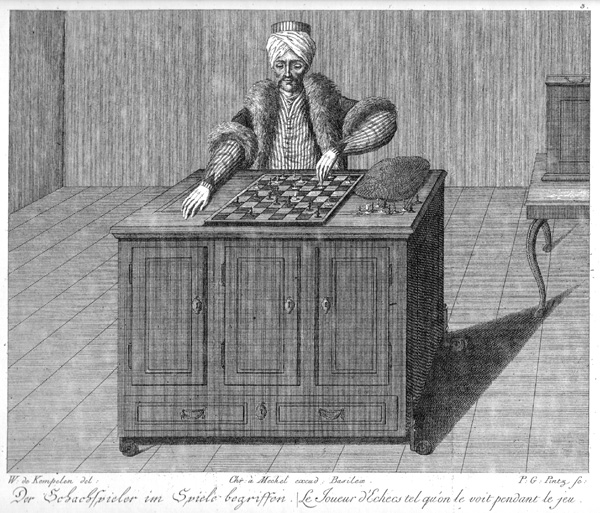
The automated chess player "Mechanical Turk", as depicted in an engraving

"Maelzel's Chess Player" (1836) is an essay by Edgar Allan Poe exposing a fraudulent automaton chess player called The Turk, which had become famous in Europe and the United States and toured widely. The fake automaton was invented by Wolfgang von Kempelen in 1769 and was brought to the U.S. in 1825 by Johann Nepomuk Mälzel after von Kempelen's death.

== Background ==
In his essay, Poe asserts that a mechanical chess player would play perfectly, but Maelzel's "machine" occasionally errs, and is therefore suspect. Although it is the most famous essay on the Turk, many of Poe's hypotheses were incorrect. He also may or may not have been aware of earlier articles written in the Baltimore Gazette where two youths were reported to have seen chess player William Schlumberger climbing out of the machine. He did, however, borrow heavily from David Brewster's Letters on Natural Magic. Other essays and articles had been written and published prior to Poe's in Baltimore, Philadelphia, and Boston—cities in which Poe had lived or visited before writing his essay.

Poe's essay was originally published in the April 1836 issue of the Southern Literary Messenger.

Poe's essay asserts that Maelzel's troupe of automata had made at least one previous visit to Richmond, Virginia, "some years ago", at which time they were exhibited "in the house now occupied by M. Bossieux as a dancing academy". Yet, very oddly, Poe gives no precise date or location for his own more recent encounter with Maelzel's Chess-Player, apart from stating that it was exhibited in Richmond "a few weeks ago". No known 19th- or 20th-century biography of Poe discloses when or where in Richmond he witnessed the performance of the Automaton Chess-Player.

== Importance ==
The essay is important in that it predicts some general motifs of modern science fiction. Poe also was beginning to create an analytic method that would eventually be used in his "tales of ratiocination", the earliest form of a detective story, "The Gold-Bug" and "The Murders in the Rue Morgue". This point is furthered in that Poe particularly emphasized that a mind was operating the machine.

Response at the time of its publication was strong. It elicited responses from the Norfolk Herald, Baltimore Gazette, Baltimore Patriot, United States Gazette, Charleston Courier, Winchester Virginian, and New Yorker (the last of which suggested the article's only fault was its excessive length).

Poe's "Maelzel's Chess Player" was the inspiration for the television short El jugador de ajedrez aka Le joueur d'échecs de Maelzel (1981), directed by Juan Luis Buñuel and shown as part of the Poe-series Histoires extraordinaires.

The essay is cited without name by Walter Benjamin in the first of his "Theses on the Philosophy of History".

The essay is referenced by Jean Cocteau in "Barbette" (1928).
