= Joseph Friedrich Freiherr von Racknitz =

German noble (1744–1818)

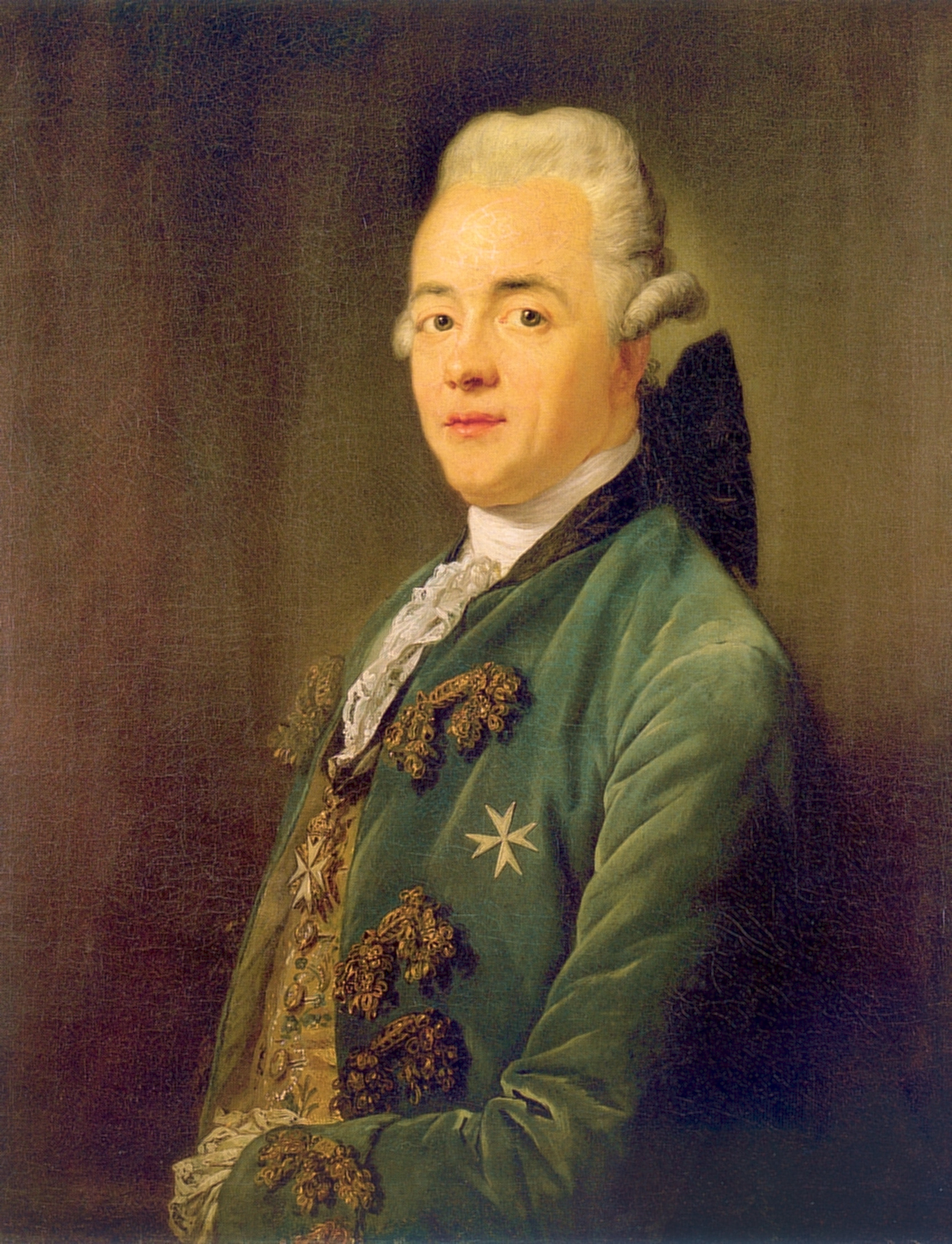
Swiss-German painter and university teacher

Joseph Friedrich Freiherr von Racknitz (1744–1818) residing in Dresden, Holy Roman Empire, he worked as the equivalent of a court marshal, and published an often-cited pamphlet about the chess-playing machine The Turk, Ueber den Schachspieler des Herrn von Kempelen und dessen Nachbildung, which attempted to reveal the secret behind the purported automaton using new illustrations as well as personal observations.

Racknitz also had a sizable insect collection. The collection, which contained over 5000 pieces, is still held at the Sachsen State Museum.
