= Karl Gottlieb von Windisch =

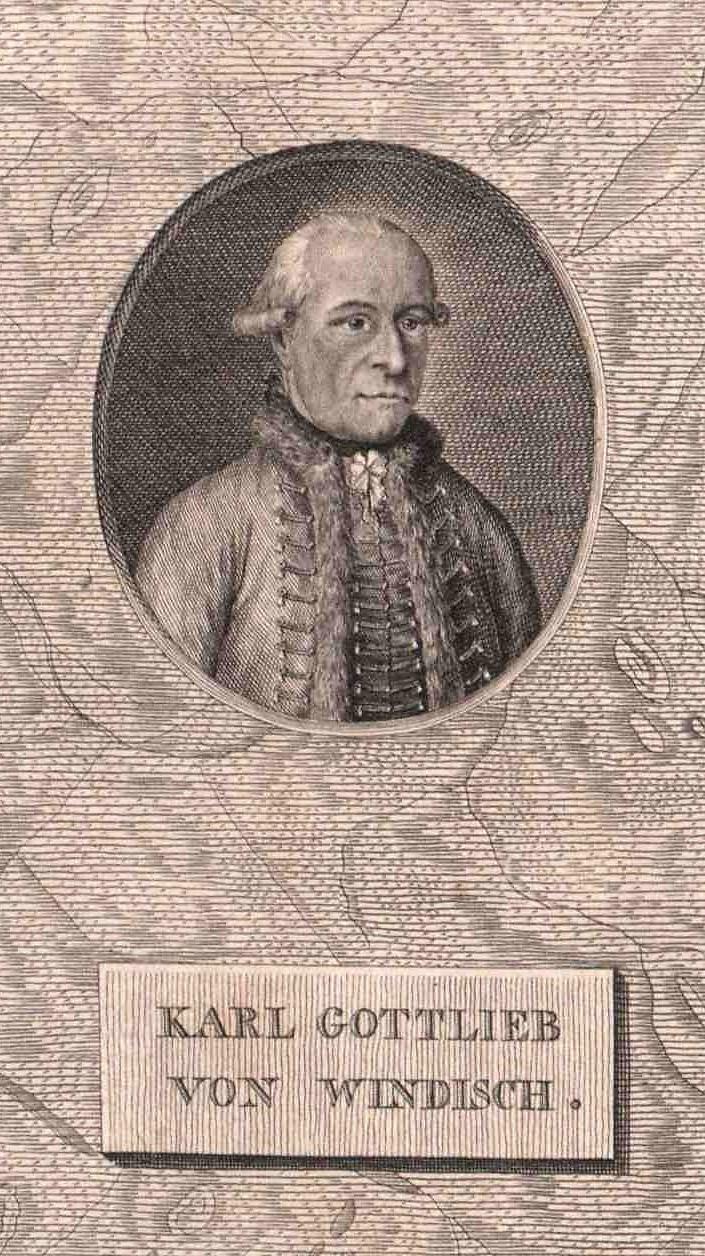
Karl Gottlieb von Windisch

Karl Gottlieb von Windisch (Latin: Carolus Theophil Windisch, Hungarian: Windisch (Vindis) Károly, January 28, 1725, Pressburg – March 30, 1793, Pressburg) was a Hungarian German writer who produced a series of letters that were published as "Briefe über den Schachspieler von Kempelen nebst drey Kupferstichen die diese berühmte Maschine vorstellen", translated as "Inanimate Reason; or a Circumstantial Account of That Astonishing Piece of Mechanism, M. de Kempelen's Chess-Player; Now Exhibiting at No. 9 Savile-Row, Burlington Gardens", following a series of performances of The Turk that he attended. The letters have been cited often since their publication in attempts to uncover the secret of the machine. Windisch spoke Slovak and Hungarian and was the first publisher of an academic Journal in Eastern Europe.

== Bibliography ==
=== Editor of Journals ===
- Pressburger Zeitung (1764–1773)
- Der Freund der Tugend (1767–1769)
- Pressburgisches Wochenblatt zur Ausbreitung der Künste und Wissenschaften (1771–1773)
- Ungrisches Magazin, oder Beyträge zur vaterländischen Geschichte, Erdbeschreibung, und Naturwissenschaft. 4 volumes (1781–1783, 1787)
- Neues Ungrisches Magazin (1791–1792)

=== Books ===
- Hanswurst. Ein Lustspiel in einem Aufzuge. Pressburg, 1761
- Der vernünftige Zeitvertreiber. Pressburg, 1770
- Politische, geographische und historische Beschreibung des Königreichs Hungarn. Pressburg, 1772 (Anonym ersch.)
- Kurzgefasste Geschichte der Ungarn von den ältesten, bis auf die itzigen Zeiten... Pressburg, 1778
- Geographie des Königreichs Ungarn. Mit Kupfern und 2 illuminirten Karten. 2. volumes, Pressburg, 1780
- Betrachtung über den Tod Ihro Majestät Maria Theresia vor einer Versammlung, von einem Ungar. Pressburg, 1780
- Briefe über den Schachspieler des Hrn. von Kempelen nebst drey Kupferstichen die diese berühmte Maschine vorstellen, published by Chr. von Mechel, Pressburg, 1783
- Geographie und Geschichte des Königreichs Ungarn für Juden. 3. edition. Pressburg, 1785
- Sammlung christlicher Lieder und Gesänge zum Gebrauche evangelischer Religionsverwandten. Pressburg, 1785
- Neues Gesang- und Gebetbuch zum gottesdienstlichen Gebrauche der evangelischen Gemeinde in Pressburg. Pressburg, 1788
- Geographie des Grossfürstenthums Siebenbürgen. Pressburg, 1790 [Verfasserschaft umstritten]
- Beschreibung der Feierlichkeiten bei der Krönung Seiner Kaiserl. Majestät Leopold des Zweiten zum ungarischen König den 15. Novemb. 1790. Pressburg
