= Sängerkrieg =

Literary work

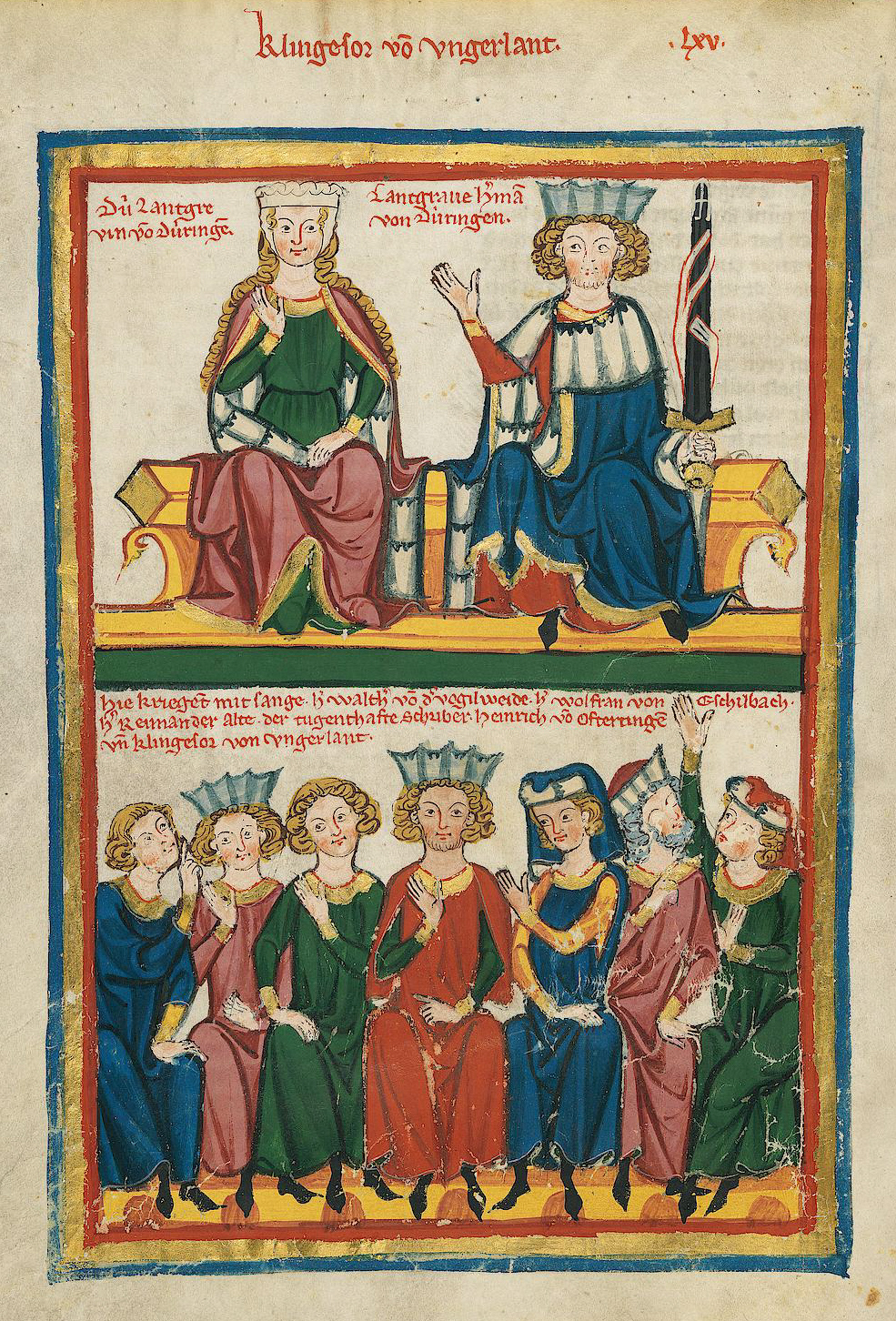
A depiction of the Sängerkrieg from the Codex Manesse

The Sängerkrieg (minstrel contest), also known as the Wartburgkrieg (Wartburg contest), was a contest among minstrels (Minnesänger) at the Wartburg, a castle in Thuringia, Germany, in 1207.

Whether the contest was purely legend or had some basis in an actual event has been debated since the Middle Ages. Local Thuringian historians, such as Dietrich von Apolda and Johannes Rothe, in the 14th and 15th centuries respectively, suggested the poems referred to an actual historical event. In the 19th century, Johann Rinne argued that the events never occurred.

== Medieval accounts of the Sängerkrieg ==
The poems of the Sängerkrieg form an important collection of Middle High German literature, reflecting a literary flourishing at the court of Count Hermann I in the early 13th century. Both historical (Wolfram von Eschenbach and Walther von der Vogelweide) and fictional (Klingsor of Hungary and Heinrich von Ofterdingen) minstrels were alleged to have participated in the competition. Reinmar von Zweter, a historical Minnesänger, is anachronistically listed as a participant.

The songs of the Wartburgkrieg have not been discovered in the original, but various versions can be found within the great Liederhandschriften of the late Middle Ages (the Codex Manesse, Jenaer Liederhandschrift, Kolmarer Liederhandschrift). A collection of lyrical poems entitled "Der Sängerkrieg auf der Wartburg", written between 1240 and 1260, was translated into modern German by Karl Simrock and published in 1858.

== Story of the Sängerkrieg ==
The oldest poetic accounts, dating from the 13th century, describe specific episodes of the contest such as the Fürstenlob and the Rätselspiel.

The Fürstenlob ("princely praise") was a contest among six minstrels: Heinrich von Ofterdingen, Walther von der Vogelweide, Biterolf, Reinmar von Zweter, Wolfram von Eschenbach and Heinrich Schreiber. The six singers were placed before the Count and Countess of Thuringia, in order to determine which best understood how to sing praises of a prince. Heinrich von Ofterdingen was the most eloquent, but earned the envy of the other minstrels, who tricked him into earning a death sentence. Heinrich gained the protection of Countess Sophia and a one-year reprieve, during which he went to Hungary and sought the assistance of the sorcerer Klingsor. Heinrich and Klingsor returned to Thuringia to resume the contest.

The Rätselspiel ("mystery game") was the subsequent poetic duel between Wolfram von Eschenbach and the Hungarian sorcerer Klingsor. Wolfram proved himself capable and eloquent, and when Klingsor grew weary he summoned a demon to continue the duel. When Wolfram began to sing of the Christian mysteries, the demon was unable to respond.

== The Sängerkrieg in modern literature ==
The history of the Sängerkrieg in modern literature begins in the 18th century with Johann Jakob Bodmer's Wiederentdeckung des Mittelalters (Rediscovery of the Middle Ages), which contained an account of the Sängerkrieg. Interest in the minstrels grew in popularity, as evidenced by the publication of “Heinrich von Ofterdingen” by Novalis in 1802. While Novalis did not describe the Sängerkrieg itself, the event was central to E. T. A. Hoffmann's Der Kampf der Sänger (1818). An account of the contest could also be found in the Grimm Brothers' Deutsche Sagen (1816). One of the most famous interpretations is Richard Wagner's Tannhäuser und der Sängerkrieg auf Wartburg (1845). Wagner was the first to merge the Tannhäuser legend with the Wartburg Sängerkrieg. In Wagner's version, the Sängerkrieg is completely subordinated to the Tannhäuser story and the theme of release (Erlösung). The mythical sorcerer Klingsor, (Note: Klingsor is also the name of the evil sorcerer in Wagner's late opera Parsifal.) as an adversary of Christian conviction, is the figure which made possible the blending of these stories, because he could also embody the same demonic forces which had trapped Tannhäuser under the spell of the Lady Venus.

In the early 19th century, the Wartburg re-emerged as a German cultural symbol, and restoration work began in 1838. As part of this restoration, Moritz von Schwind painted frescoes in several parts of the castle between 1854 and 1856. The Minstrel Contest Fresco (Sängerstreitfresko) is the largest of them, making the viewer believe that he or she is actually witnessing the event. The inscription reads: “In this hall the singer’s contest was held on the 7th of July 1207, for the birthday of Saint Elizabeth.” (“In diesem Saale wurde der Sängerstreit gehalten den 7ten Juli 1207, dem Geburtstag der Heil. Elisabeth.”)

== Literature ==
- Friedrich Heinrich Karl, Freiherr de la Motte-Fouque. Der Sängerkrieg auf der Wartburg; ein Dichterspiel. F.A. Herbig, Berlin, 1828.
- Johann Karl Friedrich Rinne. Es hat keinen Sängerkrieg zu Wartburg gegeben. I.Webel, Zeitz, 1842.
- Hermann von Plötz. Über den Sängerkrieg auf Wartburg, nebst einem Beitrage zur Literatur des Räthsels. Hoffmanische Hofbuchhandlung, Weimar, 1851.
- Karl Simrock. Der Wartburgkrieg. Cotta, Stuttgart, Augsburg 1858. OCLC 5363166
- L.C.E. Artaud-Haussmann. Le tournoi poétique de la Wartburg, poème allemand du treizième siècle. Firmin Didot, Paris, 1865
- Adolf Strack. Zur Geschichte des Gedichtes vom Wartburgkriege. A.Strack, 1883.
- Alexander, Freiherr von Gleichen-Russwurm. Die Wartburg und ihre Sänger. Levy & Müller, Stuttgart, 1911.
- August Koberstein. Über das wahrscheinliche Alter und die Bedeutung des Gedichtes vom Wartburger Kriege. A.G. Bürger, Naumburg, 1923.
- Hugo Baumgarten. Der sogenannte Wartburgkrieg. Hoya Petzold-Druck, 1931.
- Tom Rompelman. Der Wartburgkrieg. Amsterdam, H.J.Paris, 1939. LCCN 50-49039
- Friedrich Mess. Heinrich von Ofterdingen: Wartburgkrieg und verwandte Dichtungen. Böhlaus, Weimar, 1963. LCCN 87-874235
- Burghart Wachinger. Sängerkrieg. Untersuchungen zur Spruchdichtung des 13. Jahrhunderts. Beck, München 1973. ISBN 3-406-02842-X
- Burghart Wachinger. Der Sängerstreit auf der Wartburg. Von der Manesseschen Handschrift bis zu Moritz von Schwind. De Gruyter, Berlin, New York 2004. ISBN 3-11-017919-9
- Robert Löhr. Krieg der Sänger. Piper, München, Zürich, 2012.
