= Heinrich von Ofterdingen =

Medieval German poet

- Created by: 13th-century Sängerkrieg epic / Novalis

In-universe information
- Gender: Male
- Occupation: Poet, Minnesinger

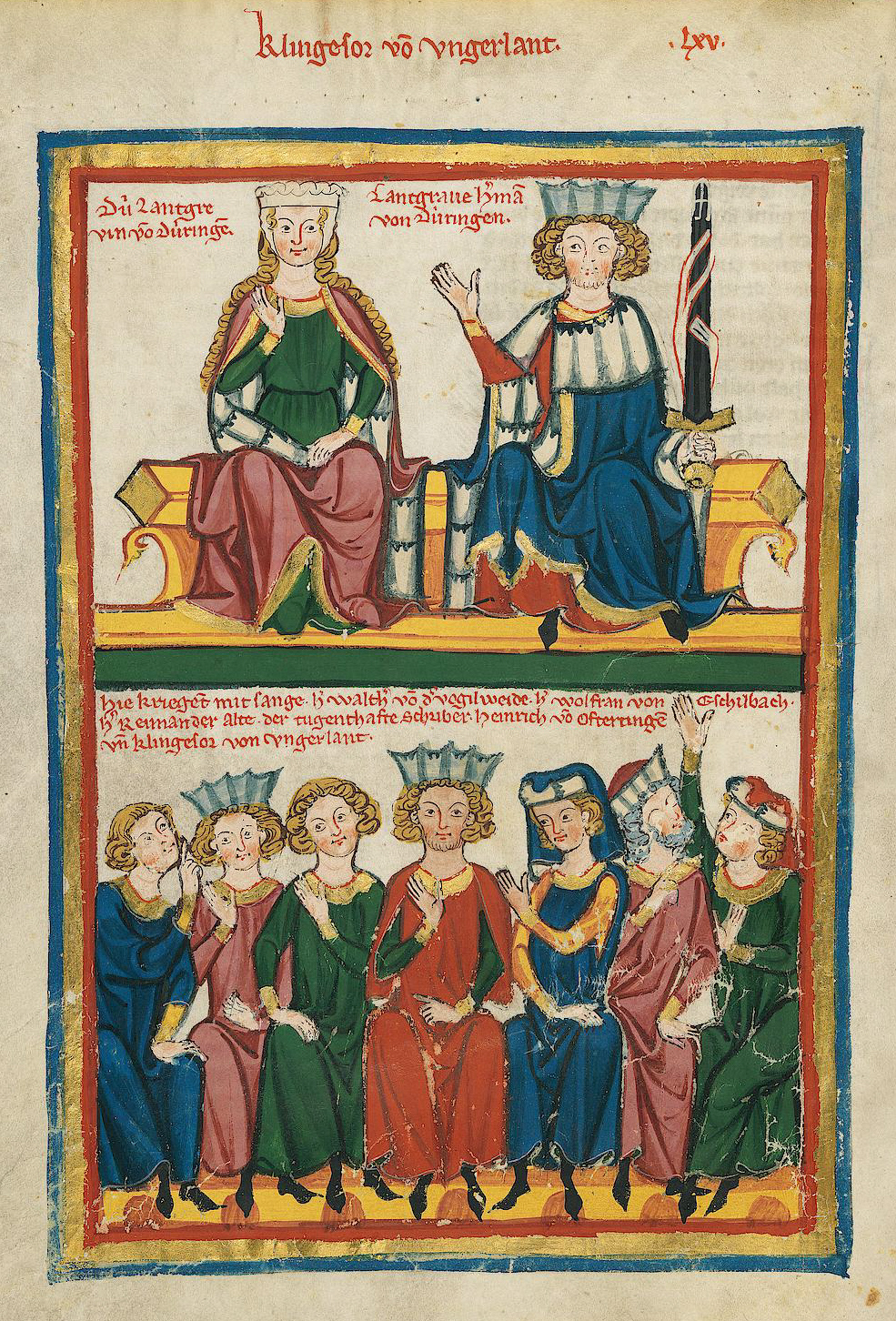
Landgrave Hermann I of Thuringia, his consort Sophia and the contending Minnesingers, Klingesor von Ungerlant, Codex Manesse, c. 1305–15

Heinrich von Ofterdingen was a fictitious Middle High German lyric poet and Minnesinger mentioned in the 13th-century epic of the Sängerkrieg (minstrel contest) on the Wartburg. The legend was used by Novalis in his eponymous fragmentary novel written in 1800 and by E. T. A. Hoffmann in his 1818 novella Der Kampf der Sänger.

== Sources ==
The 24 Fürstenlob (princely praise) stanzas of the Sängerkrieg describe Heinrich's challenge to the most famous singers like Walther von der Vogelweide, Reinmar von Zweter and Wolfram von Eschenbach in the presence of the Landgrave of Thuringia. Defeated by cunning he obtains the permission to call in the legendary sorcerer Klingsor von Ungerlant (Hungary) to his relief. Several versions of the Sängerkrieg, partially divergent, were rendered in later Liederhandschrift manuscripts, among them the Codex Manesse; it was depicted as a historic event already by medieval chroniclers such as Dietrich of Apolda. The younger vulgate version of the Laurin poem about Dietrich von Bern (Theoderic the Great) ascribes the authorship to Heinrich.

After the Sängerkrieg was republished by the Swiss author Johann Jakob Bodmer (1698–1783), the medieval tale about poetry and society became popular with Romantic writers. Heinrich von Ofterdingen became chiefly known by the novel of Novalis published in 1802 and the dramatic realisation in Richard Wagner's opera Tannhäuser, coalesced with the late medieval Tannhäuser legend, a conflation created by C. T. L. Lucas in his Über den Krieg von Wartburg (1838). The Novalis novel also contained the symbol of the Blue Flower, which became a key symbol in Romanticism. In the early 20th century, nationalistic German writers portrayed Heinrich as a defender of veritable German poetry and even as author of the Nibelungenlied poem.
