= Robert Löhr =

German novelist and screenwriter (born 1973)

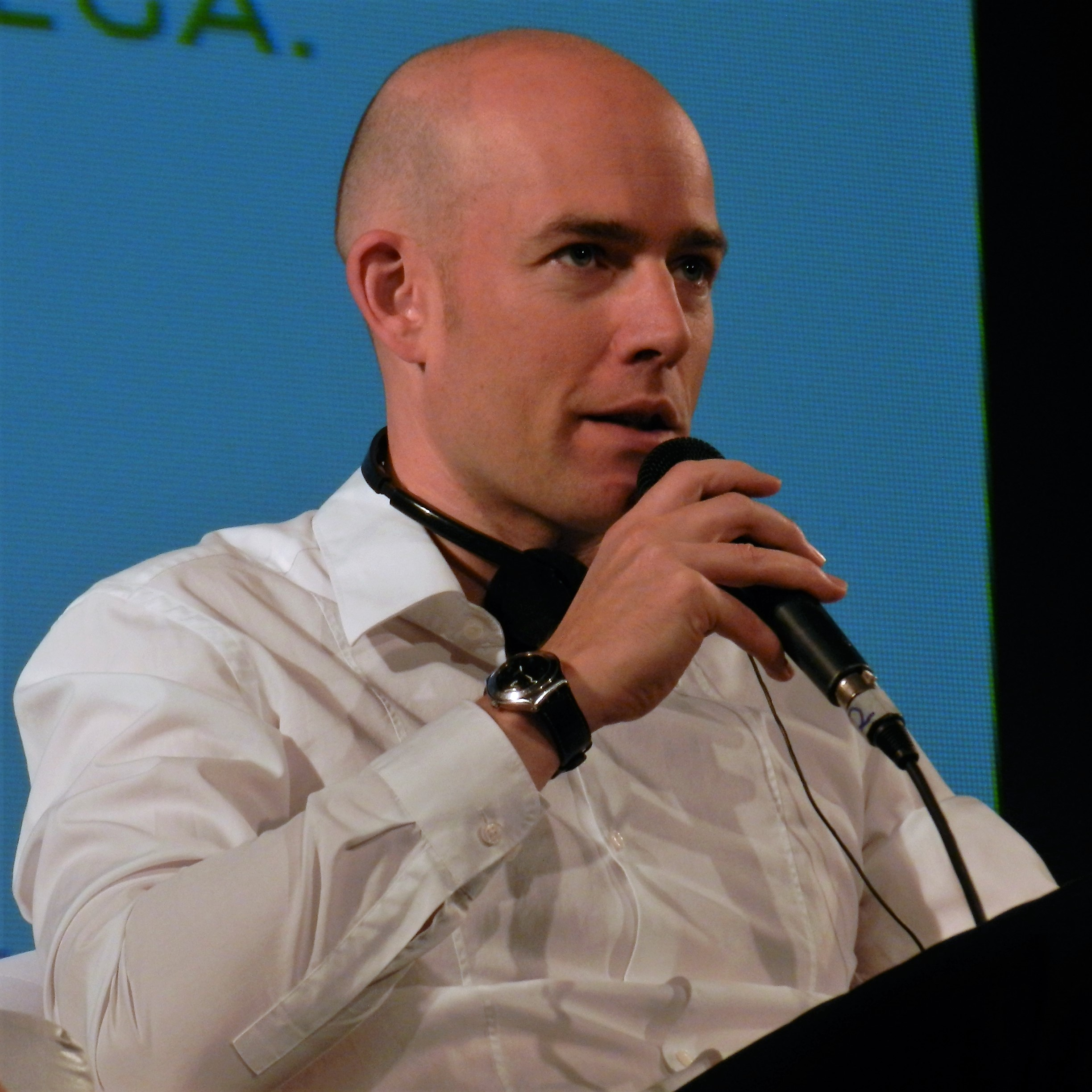
Robert Löhr

Robert Löhr (born 17 January 1973) is a German novelist and screenwriter. He is best known for his novel Der Schachautomat, translated into English by Anthea Bell as The Chess Machine. (The Secrets of the Chess Machine in the UK). His work has been largely collected by libraries.

== Life and career ==
Robert Löhr was born in Berlin and brought up in Bremen and Santa Barbara, California. He went to journalism school in Berlin and studied North American and German literature at the Free University of Berlin before attending the Deutsche Film- und Fernsehakademie Berlin to become a screenwriter.

Starting in 2005, he has written five historical novels on topics such as the chess-playing turk, the fabled Sängerkrieg, the friendship of Goethe and Schiller and the birth of the Oberammergau Passion Play.

== Bibliography ==
- Der Schachautomat, Piper, Munich 2005. ISBN 3-492-04796-3
- Das Erlkönig-Manöver, Piper, Munich 2007. ISBN 978-3-492-04929-0
- Das Hamlet-Komplott, Piper, Munich 2010. ISBN 978-3-492-05327-3
- Krieg der Sänger, Piper, Munich 2012. ISBN 978-3-492-05451-5
- Erika Mustermann, Piper, Munich 2013. ISBN 978-3-492-05452-2
- Oberammergau, Piper, Munich 2026. ISBN 978-3492613187
