= Pierre Charles Fournier de Saint-Amant =

French chess master and editor (1800–1872)

Pierre de Saint-Amant
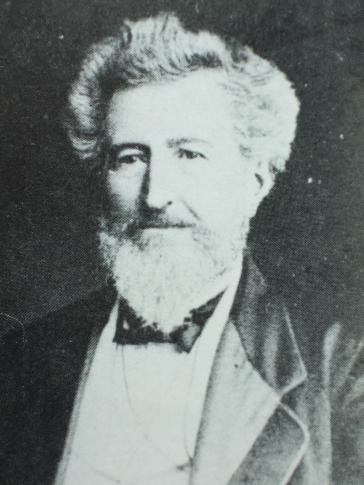
- Pierre Saint-Amant

Personal information
- Born: Pierre Charles Fournier de Saint-Amant; 12 September 1800 Monflanquin, Lot-et-Garonne, France
- Died: 29 October 1872 (aged 72) French Algeria

Chess career
- Country: France

Pierre Charles Fournier de Saint-Amant (12 September 1800 – 29 October 1872) was a French chess master and an editor of the chess periodical Le Palamède. He is known for losing a match against Howard Staunton in 1843 that is often considered to have been an unofficial match for the World Chess Championship.

== Chess career ==
Saint-Amant learned chess from Wilhelm Schlumberger, who later became the operator of The Turk. He played at the Café de la Régence, where he was a student of Alexandre Deschapelles. For many years he played on level terms with Boncourt, a strong player, and received odds of pawn and two moves from Deschapelles and Louis-Charles Mahé de La Bourdonnais. In 1834–36, he led a Paris team that won both games of a correspondence match against the Westminster Club, then England's leading chess club. After La Bourdonnais' death in 1840, he was considered the country's best player. In December 1841 he revived Le Palamède (at its inception in 1836 the world's first chess periodical), which ran until 1847.

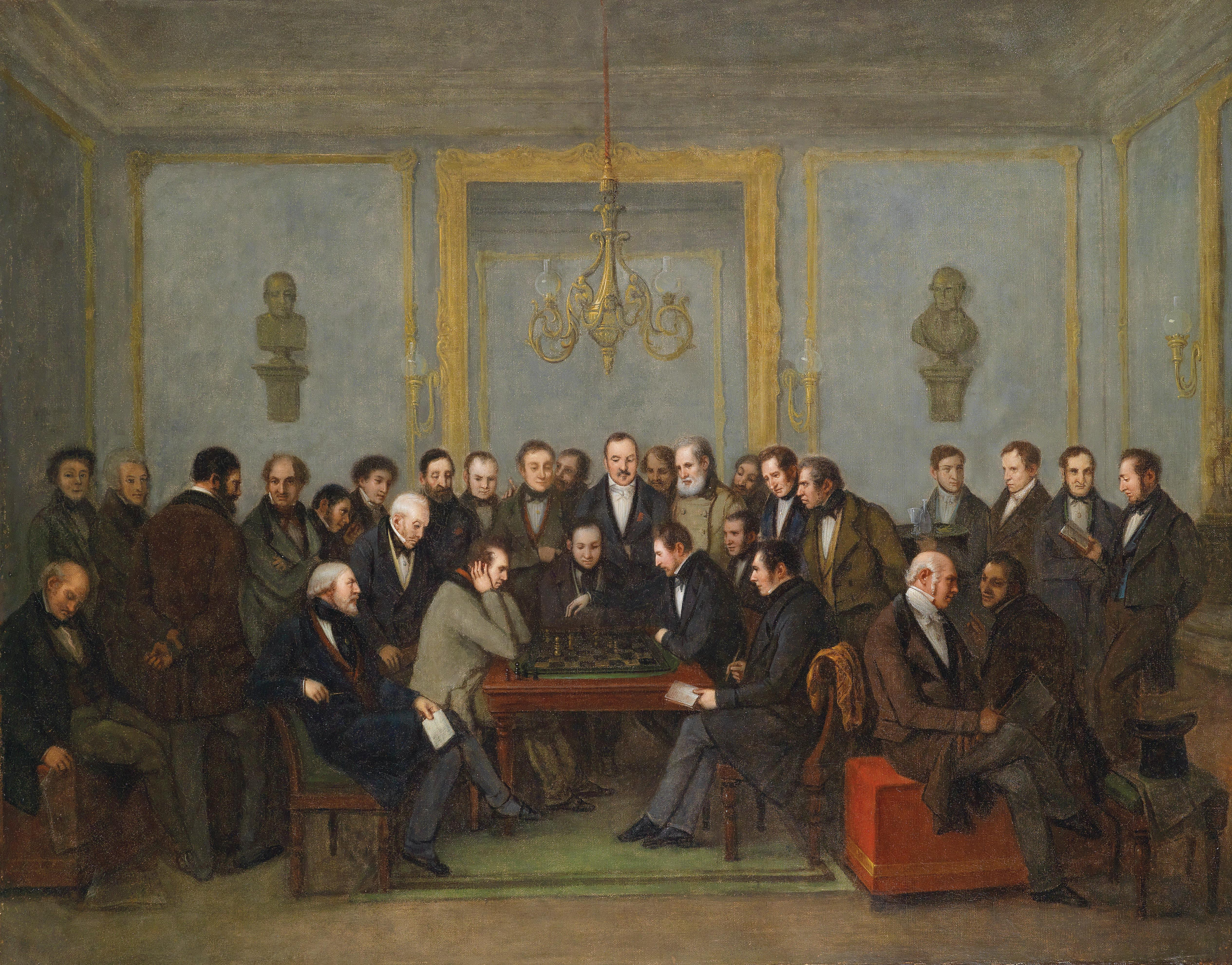
A depiction of the chess match between Howard Staunton and Pierre Charles Fournier Saint-Amant, on 16 December 1843 by Jean-Henri Marlet

He played two matches against Staunton in 1843. The first, in London, he won 3½–2½ (three wins, one draw, two losses), but he lost a return match in Paris just before Christmas 13–8 (six wins, four draws, eleven losses). This second match is sometimes considered an unofficial world championship match.

In 1858, Saint-Amant played in the Birmingham tournament, a knockout event. He won in the first round, but lost in the second by a 2–1 score to Ernst Falkbeer. Returning to Paris, he witnessed the adulatory reception accorded Paul Morphy at the Café de la Régence. The score of one game between them is known, a 22-move rout by Morphy of Saint-Amant and his consultation partner, given as "F. de L." or "F. de L'A".

== Outside of chess ==
Saint-Amant was born in Monflanquin. He became a government clerk in Paris at an early age. He then served as the secretary to the governor of French Guiana from 1819 to 1821. He was dismissed from that appointment after he protested against the slave trade that still existed in that colony. After that, he tried his hand as a journalist and actor, then became a successful wine merchant. He was a captain in the French National Guard during the 1848 revolution. For his role in saving the Palais des Tuileries from destruction by the mob, he was made its Governor for a few months. In 1851–52, he was the French consul to California. He visited during this period the Territory of Oregon, witnessed a period of transition for the early settlements and wrote one of the few records available on this period. Upon returning to France he spent some years writing well-regarded works on the French colonies, and a treatise on the wines of Bordeaux.

In 1861 Saint-Amant retired to Algeria. He died there in 1872 after being thrown from his carriage.

== Notable games ==
Saint-Amant vs. Staunton, 1843

Position: c8 black queen, f8 black rook, g8 black king, b7 black bishop, c7 black rook, f7 black pawn, g7 black pawn, h7 black pawn, a6 black pawn, b6 black pawn, d6 black bishop, e6 black knight, d5 white pawn, f5 white bishop, b4 white pawn, e4 black pawn, a3 white pawn, f3 white knight, h3 white pawn, b2 white bishop, d2 white queen, e2 white rook, f2 white pawn, g2 white pawn, e1 white rook, g1 white king

Position after 22.d5!

Position: d8 black queen, f8 black rook, g8 black king, b7 black bishop, c7 black rook, f7 black pawn, g7 black pawn, h7 black pawn, a6 black pawn, b6 black pawn, d6 black bishop, e6 white rook, d5 white pawn, f5 white bishop, b4 white pawn, a3 white pawn, f3 black pawn, h3 white pawn, b2 white bishop, d2 white queen, f2 white pawn, g2 white pawn, e1 white rook, g1 white king

Position after 23...Qd8

Reuben Fine writes that although Saint-Amant lost his epic match against Staunton, in the 13th match game, playing White, "he at least had the satisfaction of winning the most brilliant game."

1. d4 e6 2. c4 d5 3. e3 Nf6 4. Nc3 c5 5. Nf3 Nc6 6. a3 Be7 7. Bd3 0-0 8. 0-0 b6 9. b3 Bb7 10. cxd5 exd5 11. Bb2 cxd4 12. exd4 Bd6 13. Re1 a6 14. Rc1 Rc8 15. Rc2 Rc7 16. Rce2 Qc8 17. h3 Nd8 18. Qd2 b5 19. b4 Ne6 20. Bf5 Ne4 21. Nxe4 dxe4 22. d5! (first diagram) exf3? 22...Bf4! was essential. 23. Rxe6! Qd8 (second diagram) Of course not 23...fxe6 24.Bxe6+, winning the queen. 24. Bf6!! gxf6 25. Rxd6! Kg7 If 25...Qxd6, 26.Qh6 forces mate. Black could resign here. 26. Rxd8 Rxd8 27. Be4 fxg2 28. Qf4 Rc4 29. Qg4+ Kf8 30. Qh5 Ke7 31. d6+ Kxd6 32. Bxb7 Kc7 33. Bxa6 Rc3 34. Qxb5 1–0

In the 9th match game, Saint-Amant had pulled off a swindle that grandmaster Andrew Soltis considers the greatest ever perpetrated in match play.

== See also ==
- List of chess games
