= Hyacinthe Henri Boncourt =

French chess player (1765?–1840)

Hyacinthe Henri Boncourt (1765? – March 23, 1840) was a French chess player. He was one of the leading chess players in France in the years between 1820 and 1840.

== Biography ==
Although he was one of the leading players of his time, not much is known about his life. The date of his birth can only be estimated. Rod Edwards gives 1765 as a reasonable birth date based on Walker's assertion that in 1839 Boncourt was about seventy years old.

Although a contemporary of Philidor, Boncourt never played with the French master, who had since emigrated to England, but was initiated to chess by some of Philidor's students and in particular Carlier, Bernard and Leger who frequented the Café de la Régence. Here, he probably met Legall de Kermeur, Philidor's teacher, who played assiduously at the Café de la Régence almost until the year of his death in 1794. He traveled around Europe, but he never visited London.

He was a civil servant, and chess was mostly a hobby for him. He played until a late age and, actually, he obtained his best results after he was sixty years old, when, taking advantage of being retired he could devote his full time to chess. G. Walker in Chess and chess-players describes the French master as follows:

One, ancient of days, walks quietly across the floor, and hats are raised in token of respect at the coming in of M. Boncourt, the Nestor of the camp. Seventy years and more have passed over him; but their weight has not bowed down his light and even spirit. To the simplicity of the dove, as regards his dealings with the world, Boncourt unites, in chess, the veriest serpent guile. Inferior to none, save De la Bourdonnais, in skill, there breathes not the mortal more free from arrogance or vanity than our venerable professor. Attired in an old-fashioned frock-coat which sweeps the ground, with a vest of scarlet, or perchance grass-green, Boncourt placidly smoothes down his silver locks, as he drops mechanically into his seat before the chess-board. Eccentric in some of his habits, Boncourt in his old age keeps hours which render it difficult to secure him as an antagonist. He delights in dining at ten o'clock at night; and he'll then mate you till cock-crow. Having a comfortable pension as a retired government clerk, he takes the world as he finds it, and practices the true philosophy of resignation under every stroke of fate, whether in life or in chess. He receives beating better than any Frenchman of his day, shrugging up his shoulders and replacing the men, when defeated, with a nonchalance perfectly edifying. His favourite companion is a little dog; well known to the chess circle, and a frequent visitor at the Régence. Boncourt has never been in England, which, considering the present facilities of travelling, is remarkable; and evinces total disregard as to fame, whether present or posthumous.

In 1818, for a brief period, he was the operator of the Turk. At that time, he was not yet one of the best players in France. Furthermore, in the days when he was hidden inside the Automaton, he caught the flu and his performance was rather poor. While he was hiding inside the Turk, due to the flu, he was seized by coughing and the sound was perceived by the spectators, creating a certain embarrassment to Mälzel (the Turk owner). For this reason, Mälzel, subsequently, added some noisy gears to the Turk, which had no other purpose but to cover any noise that could come from the operator.

== Trivia ==
As already mentioned the reputation of Boncourt consolidates after retirement when he could go more assiduously to the Café de la Regence. His little dog, who followed him everywhere, became as known as him among the chess players of the Café:

«Quel est ce petit chien qui entre en jappant, et va s'installer tout droit sur la banquette du fond? C'est le précurseur et l'ami de Boncourt, le grand vizir de la Régence. Joueur lent, serré, correct, mais froid, absorbé dans ses élucubrations, M. Boncourt a devancé son temps d'un demi-siècle; il eût été parfait de nos jours. Véritable automate, il parlait peu, ne riait jamais, gagnait toujours, et se relirait à minuit, quittant l'échiquier sans la plus légère apparence de fatigue ou d'émotion, empochant son argent et son chien.»

== Chess career ==
In the period 1834–1836 is part of the Committee of the Paris Chess Club, who played the famous match by correspondence with the Westminster Chess Club. The others were Alexandre, St. Amant and Chamouillet, while the British lined up McDonnell, Lewis and Walker and others.

In 1835, he drew a match in Paris with Szén. In 1839 he defeated Walker in a short match (+2-1). In 1840, he first defeated (19-16) St. Amant and then drew a match with Kieseritzky.

In the period between 1830 and 1840, Boncourt was one of the strongest players in Europe. The magazine The Philidoran directed by G. Walker, in 1838 published a sort of ranking of the best players of the period divided by nationality; Boncourt is second in France behind De la Bourdonnais and of the same strength of St. Amant. The web-site Edo Historical Chess Ratings places him third in the world between 1839 and 1840 after Deschapelles and de la Bourdonnais.

== Style of play ==
G. Walker in Chess and chess-players (1850) describes Boncourt's style of play in the following way:

“Boncourt's style of play is the correct, rather than the brilliant. Comparatively weak in the mechanical openings and endings, from never having looked at a chess-book in his life, Boncourt has no superior in the capacity of piercing through the intricacies of positions of intense difficulty. "In the twenty-five years I have played chess," said La Bourdonnais to me, "never did I see Boncourt commit an error in a crowded situation." His favourite début is the Giuoco Piano; in the early stages of which he almost invariably drives up his queen's knight's and queen's rook's pawn two squares. I must add that Boncourt has not the usual rapidity of the French school; but is to the full as slow in digesting his chess calculations as 'nous autres' in the London Chess Club.”

He liked to play chess, which he considered essentially a hobby, but did not like studying theory; this fact was well known in Parisian circles. For this reason, as the above Walker's quotation indicates, he did not excel in the most theoretical parts of the game: the opening and the endgame.

As an example of Boncourt's play the following game played with Kieseritzky is reported. Punctuation and the notes between square parenthesis come from analysis carried out with the chess engine FireBird 1.2, which indicates that Black's attack after Kieseritzky's mistake on move 21 is almost flawless.

Kieseritzky - Boncourt
Paris, 1839
1.a3 e5 2.e4 Bc5 3.Bc4 Nf6 4.Nc3 c6 5.Nf3 d6 6.d3 0–0 7.Ne2 d5 8.exd5 cxd5 9.Ba2 Nc6 10.b4 Bd6 11.Bb2 Bg4 12.Qd2 e4 13.Nfd4 Re8 14.0–0 Be5 15.Nxc6 bxc6 16.Bxe5 Rxe5 17.d4 Rh5 18.Nf4 Rh6 19.c4 Qd6 20.h3 g5 21.hxg4? [The reason of all white problems, according to Firebird 1.2] 21...Nxg4! 22.f3 e3 23.Qe1 gxf4 24.fxg4 f3 25.g3 f2+ 26.Rxf2 exf2+ [even faster was 26...Qxg3+ 27.Rg2 Qh3] 27.Qxf2 Rh3 28.Kg2 Qh6 29.Qf5 Rh2+ 30.Kf3 Qd2 0–1
