= Walker Chess-player =

1820s chess automaton

The Walker Chess-player was a chess-playing "machine" created by the Walker Brothers of Baltimore, Maryland. The machine was produced in the 1820s to compete with The Turk, a world-famous chess "machine". Johann Nepomuk Mälzel, a Bavarian musician with an interest in various machines and devices who owned and operated the Turk, viewed the competing machine and attempted to buy it, but the offer was declined and the duplicate machine toured for a number of years, never receiving the fame that Mälzel's machine did, and eventually fell into obscurity.

These 19th-century machines were hoaxes that disguised a human player with stage-magic devices, unlike modern chess playing machines which play without human intervention.
