= Gazette (Baltimore) =

Triweekly newspaper in Baltimore, Maryland

The Gazette was a triweekly newspaper published in Baltimore, Maryland, in 1827. On June 1, 1827, an article in the Gazette revealed that the so-called "Mechanical Turk", allegedly an automaton which could play chess, was a hoax and only worked because of a human chess master operating it from the inside.
