= Aaron Alexandre =

German–French–English chess player and writer (1765/68–1850)

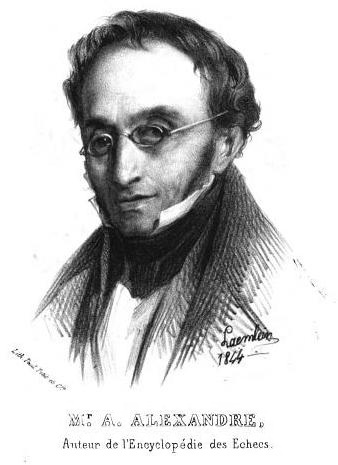
Aaron Alexandre portrayed by Alexandre Laemlein (1844)

Aaron (Albert) Alexandre (Hebrew: אהרון אלכסנדר, around 1765/68 in Hohenfeld, Franconia – 16 November 1850 in London, England) was a German–French–English chess player and writer.

Aaron Alexandre, a Bavarian trained as a rabbi, arrived in France in 1793. Encouraged by the French Republic's policy of religious toleration, he became a French citizen. At first, he worked as a German teacher and as a mechanical inventor. Eventually, chess became his primary occupation. He tried to make a complete survey of the chess openings, publishing his findings as the Encyclopédie des échecs (Encyclopedia of Chess, Paris, 1837). In this book, he used the algebraic notation and the castling symbols 0–0 and 0–0–0. In 1838, he won a match against Howard Staunton in London, though before Staunton became a master. Alexandre was one of the operators of the fake chess-playing machine known as the Turk.

== See also ==
- List of Jewish chess players
