= George Walker (chess player) =

English chess player

Walker between William Lewis and Augustus Mongredien

George Walker (13 March 1803 – 23 April 1879) was an English chess player and author of The Celebrated Analysis of A D Philidor (London, 1832), The Art of Chess-Play: A New Treatise on the Game of Chess (London, 1832), A Selection of Games at Chess played by Philidor (London, 1835), Chess Made Easy (London, 1836), and Chess Studies (London, 1844). His father was a publisher and novelist.

In 1839, Walker visited Paris and the Café de la Régence, where he lost (+1−2) a short match to Boncourt.. In 1845, he teamed up with Henry Thomas Buckle, William Davies Evans, George Perigal, and William Josiah Tuckett in London in two telegraph games (one win and one draw) against a team of Howard Staunton and Hugh Alexander Kennedy in Portsmouth. He won a match against Daniel Harrwitz (+7−5) at London 1846.

Walker used his column in Bell's Life in London to propagate organizing the international London 1851 chess tournament, the first international chess tournament. Adolf Anderssen won, leading many to consider him the world's strongest player.
