= Le Palamède =

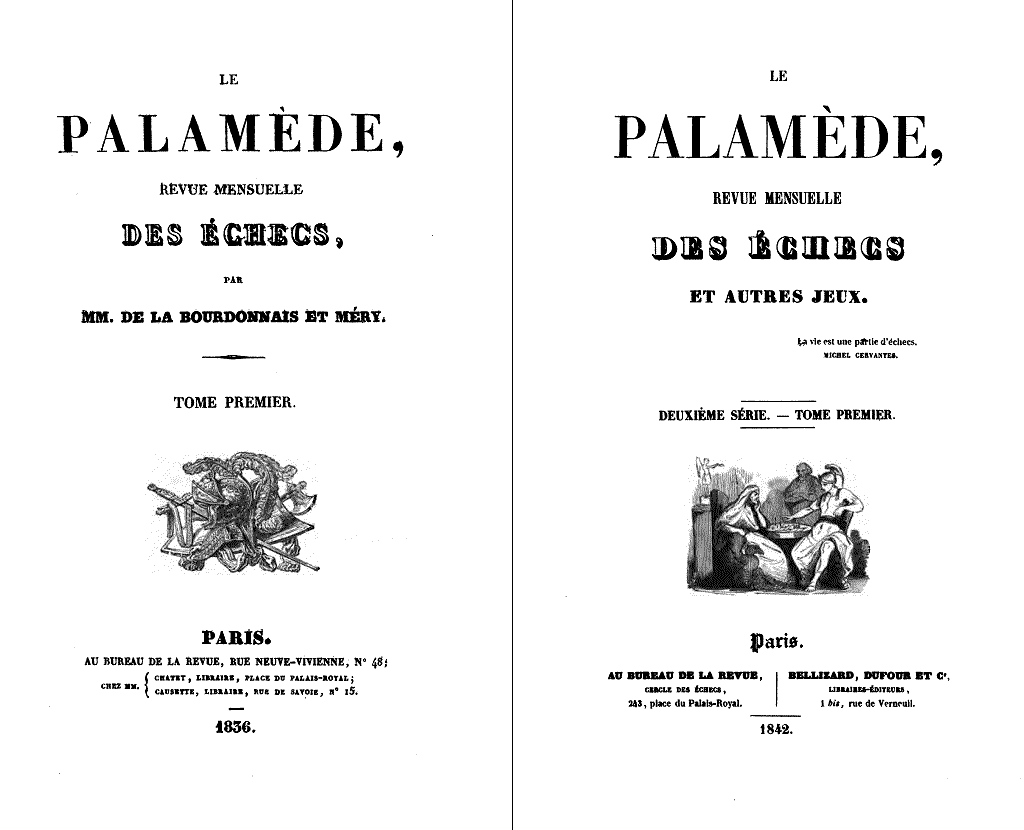
Le Palamède, front covers of the first and second series.

Le Palamède was the world's first periodical devoted to the game of chess. It was founded in France in 1836 by Louis-Charles Mahé de la Bourdonnais, who is often considered to have been an unofficial world chess champion. It ceased publication in 1839, but was revived in December 1841 by Pierre Charles Fournier de Saint-Amant, who continued publishing it until the end of 1847.

The magazine was named after Palamedes, the inventor of dice in Greek mythology.
