= Hugh Alexander Kennedy =

English chess master

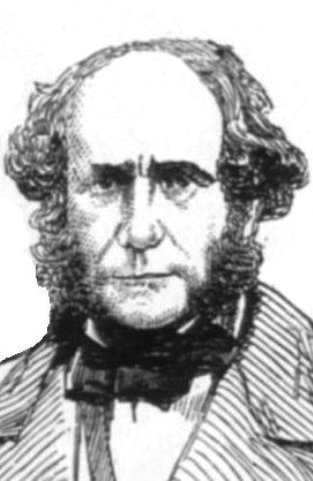
- H. A. Kennedy

Personal information
- Full name: Hugh Alexander Kennedy
- Born: 22 August 1809 Madras, British India
- Died: 22 October 1878 (aged 69) Reading, England

Chess career
- Country: England

Hugh Alexander Kennedy (22 August 1809 – 22 October 1878) was an English chess master and writer.

== Chess career ==
Hugh Alexander Kennedy was born in Madras, British India in 1809. He was a British army captain and leading London chess player. He established the first chess club in Brighton in 1842. In 1844, he lost a match to Howard Staunton (3–8). In 1845, he teamed up with Staunton in Portsmouth in two telegraph games (lost and drew) against a team of Henry Thomas Buckle, George Walker, William Davies Evans, Perigal, and Tuckett in London. He lost a match to Elijah Williams (+2−4=0) in 1846 and lost a match to Edward Löwe (+6−7=1) in 1849, both in London.

Kennedy played in the great international London 1851 chess tournament and finished in sixth place of the sixteen competitors. He knocked out Carl Mayet in round 1 with two wins. In round 2, he lost to Marmaduke Wyvill (+3−4=1). In round 3, he defeated James Mucklow with four wins. Finally, he lost to József Szén (+0−4=1).

In 1862, Kennedy lost perhaps the first international telegraphic game, against Serafino Dubois.

Kennedy died in Reading, England, in 1878.

== "Napoleon" game ==
In the story "Some Reminiscences of the Life of Augustus Fitzsnob, Esq." (inspired by Thackeray's The Book of Snobs), Kennedy gave the score of a chess game said to be played by Napoleon and Count Bertrand. First published in 1860, it was later included in Waifs and Strays (2nd edition, 1876), a collection of Kennedy's writings. It has been erroneously cited as a true Napoleon game many times since, although it is actually the score of a game between Kennedy and John Owen.

This is the score given by Kennedy in the two-column notation that was common at the time, and in modern algebraic notation.

"Napoleon vs. Bertrand"

Position: a8 black rook, c8 black bishop, d8 black king, g8 white bishop, h8 black rook, b7 black pawn, c7 black pawn, d7 black pawn, e7 black bishop, g7 black pawn, h7 black pawn, a5 black pawn, e5 white pawn, e4 white pawn, b3 white queen, a2 white pawn, g2 white pawn, h2 white pawn, a1 black queen, b1 white knight, c1 white bishop, f1 white rook, h1 white king

White to move mates in 5

Napoleon	Bertrand	Algebraic notation
1. P to K fourth	1. P to K fourth	1. e4 e5
2. Kt to K B third	2. Kt to Q B third	2. Nf3 Nc6
3. P to Q fourth	3. Kt takes P	3. d4 Nxd4
4. Kt takes Kt	4. P takes Kt	4. Nxd4 exd4
5. K B to Q B fourth	5. K B to Q B fourth	5. Bc4 Bc5
6. P to Q B third	6. Q to K second	6. c3 Qe7
7. Castles	7. Q to K fourth	7. 0-0 Qe5
8. P to K B fourth	8. P takes P (dis. check)	8. f4 dxc3+
9. K to R square	9. P takes P	9. Kh1 cxb2
10. B takes K B P (check)	10. K to Q square	10. Bxf7+ Kd8
11. P takes Q	11. P takes R (Queening)	11. fxe5 bxa1=Q
12. B takes Kt	12. K B to K second	12. Bxg8 Be7
13. Q to Q Kt third	13. P to Q R fourth *	13. Qb3 a5
And Napoleon forces mate in five moves (see diagram)

* Kennedy writes of Black's thirteenth move: "This seems a courtier-like move on the part of Count Bertrand. He ought now have taken P at K fifth with Q, having the exchange and two Pawns in return for a formidable attack."

== Writings ==
- Kennedy, Captain H. A. (January 1860), "Some Reminiscences in the Life of Augustus Fitzsnob, Esq.", The Chess Monthly, vol. 4, pp. 1–11
- Kennedy, Captain Hugh A. (1876), Waifs and Strays, Chiefly from the Chessboard (2nd ed.), London: W. W. Morgan
