= Edward Löwe =

Personal information
- Full name: Edward Löwe
- Born: 23 September 1794 Prague, Bohemia
- Died: 24 February 1880 (aged 85) London, England

Chess career
- Country: Bohemia; England

Edward Löwe (also Eduard Loewe; 23 September 1794 – 24 February 1880) was a Bohemian-born, after 1830 naturalized English chess master.

== Personal life ==
Löwe was born in Prague and died in London.

== Match and tournament results ==
In 1847, he won a match with Howard Staunton (5–2), but his opponent gave odds of pawn and two moves. In regular matches, he won against Hugh Alexander Kennedy (7½–6½) in 1849, and lost to Frederick Deacon (2½–7½) in 1851, James Hannah (8–13) in 1857, and Paul Morphy (0–6) in 1858. The match against Morphy took place in Lowe's Hotel, which belonged to Löwe.

In tournaments, he won against Arthur Simons (2–0) and lost to George Webb Medley (1½–2½) at London 1849 (Ries' Divan, Henry Thomas Buckle won), and lost a match to Marmaduke Wyvill (0–2) at the London 1851 chess tournament (Adolf Anderssen won).

== Sources ==
- Lawson, David (1976). Paul Morphy: The Pride and Sorrow of Chess. David McKay, 1976. ISBN 978-0-679-13044-4.
