= Marmaduke Wyvill (chess player) =

British chess player and politician (1815–1896)

Member of Parliament for Richmond
- In office 1847–1865
- Preceded by: John Charles Dundas; Henry Rich
- Succeeded by: John Charles Dundas; Sir Roundell Palmer

Member of Parliament for Richmond
- In office 1866–1868
- Preceded by: John Charles Dundas; Sir Roundell Palmer
- Succeeded by: Sir Roundell Palmer

Personal details
- Born: 22 December 1815 Constable Burton, Richmondshire, North Riding of Yorkshire, England
- Died: 25 June 1896 (aged 80) Bournemouth, Dorset, England
- Spouse: Laura Ibbetson
- Parent: Marmaduke Wyvill

Marmaduke Wyvill (22 December 1815 in Constable Burton – 25 June 1896 in Bournemouth) was a leading English chess master and Liberal Party politician. He was among the world's strongest players in the 1840s and 1850s.

He was born the son of Marmaduke Wyvill of Constable Burton Hall (1791–1872), MP for York.

He was educated at Trinity College, Cambridge, and was admitted to Lincoln's Inn in 1840.

Regarded by Howard Staunton as 'one of the finest players in England', he was primarily an enthusiastic amateur of chess, yet in his sole tournament appearance at London 1851 he took second prize behind Adolf Anderssen. Finishing ahead of Staunton, Elijah Williams, Bernhard Horwitz, and Jozsef Szen, he succumbed only to Anderssen in the final, by a score of 2½-4½. Long after he had retired from competitive play, he retained a great interest in the game and was known to have contributed to the organisation and funding of the 1883 London tournament.

Through his 1845 marriage to Laura, daughter of Sir Charles Ibbetson, Bart., he came into possession of Denton Hall. In 1847 Wyvill was elected as a Member of Parliament (MP) for Richmond, North Yorkshire. He retained the seat in 1861, but lost it in 1865, regaining it for a final time in 1866.

In a chess game, the Wyvill formation refers to a pawn formation in which White has no pawn on the b file, doubled pawns at c3 and c4, and the d-pawn at d4 or d5, such as may typically arise out of variations of the Nimzo-Indian and (Winawer) French Defences. The pawn at c4 may become a weakness, since it cannot be supported by other pawns.

== Notable game ==
His triumph in the third game of the final of the London tournament saw Wyvill winning with a fine counter-attack after defending Anderssen's attack with great expertise. As Staunton put it in a note to Black's 28th move: "... the assault is conducted with uncommon ingenuity and spirit."

- Anderssen - Wyvill, London 1851

Sicilian Defence - 1. e4 c5 2. d4 cxd4 3. Nf3 Nc6 4. Nxd4 e6 5. Be3 Nf6 6. Bd3 Be7 7. O-O O-O 8. Nd2 d5 9. Nxc6 bxc6 10. e5 Nd7 11. f4 f5 12. Rf3 c5 13. Rh3 Rf7 14. b3 g6 15. Nf3 Nb6 16. Bf2 d4 17. Bh4 Nd5 18. Qd2 a5 19. Bxe7 Rxe7 20. Ng5 Ne3 21. Qf2 Bb7 22. Bf1 Ng4 23. Qh4 Qd7 24. Rd1 Rc8 25. Be2 h5 26. Rg3 Qe8 27. Rd2 Rg7 28. c3 Ne3 29. cxd4 cxd4 30. Rxd4 Rc1+ 31. Kf2 Nd5 32. Rgd3 Qc6 33. Rd2 Qb6 34. Bc4 Rc2 35. Ke1 Rxd2 36. Rxd2 Qg1+ 37. Bf1 Rc7 38. Rd1 Rc2 39. Qg3 Ba6 40. Qf3 Bxf1 0-1

Parliament of the United Kingdom
Preceded by John Charles Dundas and Henry Rich	Member of Parliament for Richmond; 1847–1865; With: Henry Rich to 1861; Sir Roundell Palmer 1861–1872	Succeeded by John Charles Dundas and Sir Roundell Palmer
Preceded by John Charles Dundas and Sir Roundell Palmer	Member of Parliament for Richmond; 1866–1868; With: Sir Roundell Palmer	Succeeded by Sir Roundell Palmer
