= Howard Staunton =

English chess master and Shakespearean scholar (1810–1874)

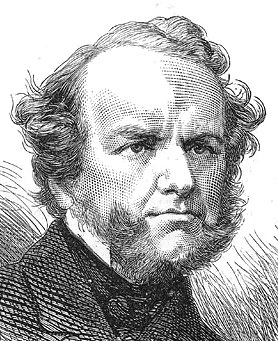
- Engraving of Staunton by Richard & Edward Taylor

Personal information
- Born: Howard Staunton; April 1810 London, England
- Died: 22 June 1874 (aged 64) London, England
- Spouse: Frances Carpenter Nethersole (m. 1849)

Chess career
- Country: England

Howard Staunton (April 1810 – 22 June 1874) was an English chess master who is generally regarded as the world's strongest player from 1843 to 1851, largely as a result of his 1843 victory over Pierre Charles Fournier de Saint-Amant. He promoted a chess set of clearly distinguishable pieces of standardised shape – the Staunton pattern promulgated by Nathaniel Cooke – that is still the style required for competitions. He was the principal organiser of the first international chess tournament in 1851, which made England the world's leading chess centre and caused Adolf Anderssen to be recognised as the world's strongest player.

From 1840 onwards he became a leading chess commentator, and won matches against top players of the 1840s. In 1847 he entered a parallel career as a Shakespearean scholar. Ill health and his two writing careers led him to give up competitive chess after 1851. In 1858 attempts were made to organise a match between Staunton and Paul Morphy, but it never came about. It was alleged by British Chess Association president Lord Lyttelton that Staunton misled Morphy while trying to avoid the match; it is also possible Staunton overestimated his chances of getting physically fit and of making time available for a match.

Modern commentators consider Staunton's understanding of positional play to have been far ahead of his contemporaries. Although not a rampant attacking player, he attacked when his preparations were complete. His chess articles and books were widely read and encouraged the development of chess in the United Kingdom, and his Chess-Players' Handbook (1847) was a reference for decades. The chess openings the English Opening and Staunton Gambit were named for his advocacy of them. Staunton has been a controversial figure since his own time, and his chess writings could be spiteful. On the other hand, he maintained good working relationships with several strong players and influential chess enthusiasts, and demonstrated excellent management skills.

== Life ==
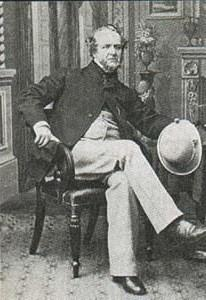
Staunton, c. 1860

Most information about Staunton's early life is based on claims he made. In the 1861 and 1871 English census, he claimed he was born in Keswick, Cumberland, located within the Lake District, which he listed as his birthplace in the 1851 census. In 1849, he listed William Staunton as his father on his marriage registration. Record of his birth or baptism has never been found.

The chess historian H. J. R. Murray summarised the information that he gleaned from various sources: Staunton was born in 1810, reputedly the natural son (meaning illegitimately born) of Frederick Howard, fifth Earl of Carlisle; he was neglected in youth, receiving little or no education; although he spent some time in Oxford, he was never a member of the university; when he came of age he inherited a few thousand pounds, which he soon squandered; in later life Staunton often used to tell how he had once played Lorenzo in The Merchant of Venice, with the famous English actor Edmund Kean playing Shylock.

=== 1836–1842, first steps in chess ===
In 1836, Staunton came to London, where he took out a subscription for William Greenwood Walker's Games at Chess, actually played in London, by the late Alexander McDonnell Esq. Staunton was apparently twenty-six when he took a serious interest in chess. He said that at that time the strongest players he saw in London, Saint-Amant and George Walker, could easily have given him rook odds.

In 1838 he played many games with Captain Evans, inventor of the Evans Gambit, and also lost a match against the German chess writer Aaron Alexandre. He had improved sufficiently by 1840 to win a match against the German master H.W. Popert, a slow, cautious player with great defensive skill.

From May to December 1840 Staunton edited a chess column for the New Court Gazette. He then became chess editor of the magazine British Miscellany, and his chess column developed into a separate magazine, the Chess Player's Chronicle, which Staunton owned and edited until the early 1850s.

=== 1843, competitive peak ===
Position: a8 black rook, b8 black knight, c8 black bishop, d8 black queen, e8 black king, f8 black bishop, g8 black knight, h8 black rook, a7 black pawn, b7 black pawn, c7 black pawn, d7 black pawn, e7 black pawn, f7 black pawn, g7 black pawn, h7 black pawn, c4 white pawn, a2 white pawn, b2 white pawn, d2 white pawn, e2 white pawn, f2 white pawn, g2 white pawn, h2 white pawn, a1 white rook, b1 white knight, c1 white bishop, d1 white queen, e1 white king, f1 white bishop, g1 white knight, h1 white rook

The English Opening, named for Staunton's use of it against Saint-Amant

Early in 1843 Staunton prevailed in a long series of games against John Cochrane, a strong player and chess theoretician. Chessmetrics treats these games incorrectly as one match when it was in fact a series of matches, and lists it as Staunton's best performance.

A little later that year he lost a short match (2½–3½) in London against the visiting French player Saint-Amant, who was generally regarded as the world's strongest active player.

Staunton challenged Saint-Amant to a longer match to be played in Paris for a stake of £100, equivalent to £11,000 in 2025. (Note: Conversion is based on prices. If conversion is based on average income, the result is about £80,000.) Then he prepared new opening lines, especially those beginning 1.c4, which became known as the English Opening after this match. He also took Thomas Worrall and Harry Wilson to Paris as his assistants; this is the first known case where seconds were used in a match. Staunton gained a seven-game lead but then struggled to keep it before winning the match 13–8 (eleven wins, four draws, and six losses) in December 1843.

Saint-Amant wanted a third match, but Staunton was initially unwilling as he had developed heart palpitations during the second match. Von der Lasa later suggested this was why Staunton faded in the second match. However, after a long, difficult negotiation, which he reported in the Chess Player's Chronicle, Staunton went to Paris intending to start their third match in October 1844, but he caught pneumonia while travelling and almost died; the match was postponed and never took place.

Several modern commentators regard Staunton as de facto World Champion after his match victory over Saint-Amant, although that title did not yet formally exist. (Note: Several authors concur on Staunton's status as world champion: Hooper and Whyld refer to Staunton as "the world's leading player in the 1840s". Hooper, D.; Whyld, K. (1992). The Oxford Companion to Chess (2nd ed.). Oxford University Press. p. 390. ISBN 0-19-866164-9.; Golombek, H. (1976). Chess: A History. G.P. Putnam's Sons. pp. 129–130.; Saidy, A.; Lessing, N. (1974). The World of Chess. Random House. p. 85. ISBN 0-394-48777-X.; Soltis, Andy (1975). The Great Chess Tournaments and their Stories. Chilton Book Company. p. 2. ISBN 0-8019-6138-6.; Schonberg, Harold C. (1973). Grandmasters of Chess. J.B. Lippincott. pp. 50–51. ISBN 0-397-01004-4.; Fine, R. (1965) [1948]. Great Moments in Modern Chess. Dover Publications. pp. 3–4. ISBN 0-486-21449-4. originally published in 1948 by David McKay as The World's a Chessboard.; Horowitz, I.A. (1973). The World Chess Championship – A History. Macmillan. p. 3. LCCN 72080175. OCLC 604994.) After Saint-Amant's defeat, no other Frenchmen arose to continue the French supremacy in chess established by Philidor, Deschapelles, La Bourdonnais and Saint-Amant. Some contemporary English commentators, mainly in Staunton's Chess Player's Chronicle, and some later writers hailed Staunton as the world champion. (Note: The Earl of Mexborough's speech to the meeting of Yorkshire Chess Clubs, reported in the 1845 Chess Player's Chronicle (with the cover date 1846); the Brighton Gazette and a letter from Edward Cronhelm, both in Chess Player's Chronicle 1851. All presented at) (Note: According to Philip W. Sergeant, Staunton after his victory over Saint-Amant, was generally regarded in England as the world champion. Sergeant expressed his concurrence with this assessment by stating "By his victory over Saint-Amant ... Staunton may fairly be held to have become unofficial chess champion of the world".)

The response was less enthusiastic elsewhere in Europe. Even in England some writers suggested other players, notably Buckle or von der Lasa, were stronger.

=== 1845–1848, chess writer and promoter ===
In 1845 Staunton began a chess column for The Illustrated London News, which became the most influential chess column in the world and which he continued for the rest of his life. Although his articles mostly focused on over-the-board play, a significant number featured correspondence chess. Some followed with enthusiasm the progress of promising youngsters, including Paul Morphy. Staunton produced over 1,400 weekly articles for The Illustrated London News.

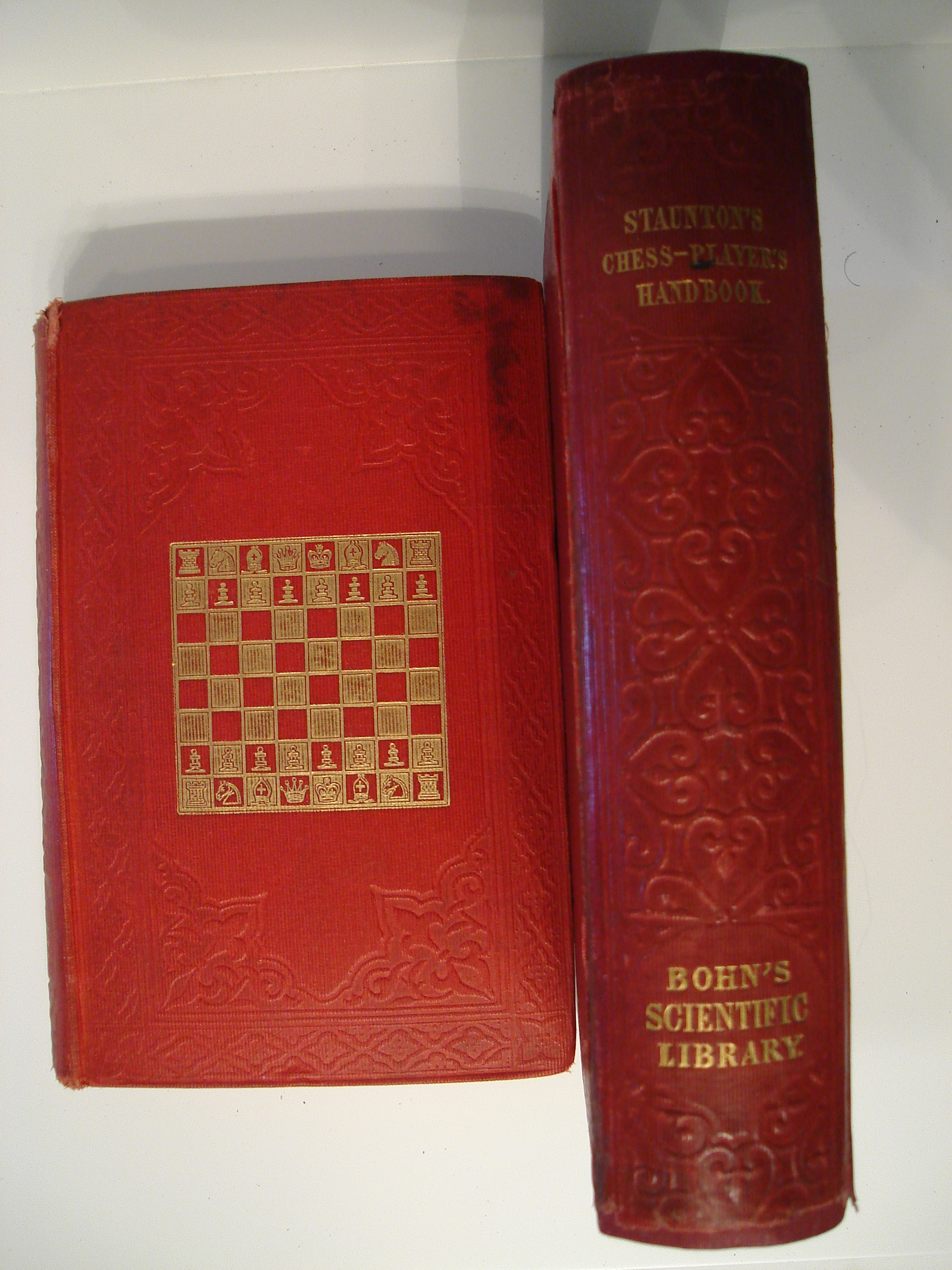
The Chess-Player's Handbook

The first chess match by electric telegraph took place in 1844, between Washington and Baltimore. In April 1845 Staunton and Captain Kennedy travelled to Gosport to play two games by telegraph against a group in London. Staunton took a long-term interest in this solution to the difficulties of travel, and reported telegraph games in The Illustrated London News. In 1871 his report of a telegraphic match between Sydney and Adelaide calculated that the 74 moves of the longest game had travelled a total of 220,000 miles (not much less than the distance between Earth and Moon).

In 1847 Staunton published his most famous work, The Chess-Player's Handbook, which is still in print. It contained over 300 pages of opening analysis, and almost 100 pages of endgame analysis. (Note: Staunton's analysis of the very rare rook versus three minor pieces endgame is surprisingly sophisticated for its time: "Three minor Pieces are much stronger than a Rook, and in cases where two of them are Bishops will usually win without much difficulty, because the player of the Rook is certain to be compelled to lose him for one of his adversary's Pieces. If, however, there are two Knights and one Bishop opposed to a Rook, the latter may generally be exchanged for the Bishop, and as two Knights are insufficient of themselves to force checkmate, the game will be drawn." (p. 439) Modern endgame tablebases confirm Staunton's assessments of both endgames.) Staunton's Handbook was based on Bilguer and von der Lasa's Handbuch des Schachspiels (first published in 1843), but enhanced by many variations and analyses of Staunton's own. His book The Chess-Player's Companion followed in 1849.

He still found time for two matches in 1846, comfortably beating the professionals Bernhard Horwitz (fourteen wins, three draws, and seven losses) and Daniel Harrwitz. The match against Harrwitz was set up in a very unusual way: seven games in which Staunton gave Harrwitz odds of pawn and two moves (Staunton won four and lost three), seven games where he gave pawn and move (Staunton lost six and won one), and seven at no odds (Staunton won all seven). (Note: A stronger player sometimes gives a weaker player an advantage. In "pawn odds" the stronger player starts without one of his pawns and plays as White (or, if there is a match at odds, the players alternate colors in the normal way), while at "pawn and move odds" (abbreviated P+1) the stronger player always has the black pieces. If the gap in skill is greater the stronger player might give "pawn and two moves" (P+2), where he starts without one of his pawns, plays as Black and lets his opponent have a further extra move. If the difference in skill is even greater, the stronger player may give knight, bishop or even rook odds (removing the relevant piece before the game starts).)

=== 1849, marriage and design of a chess set ===
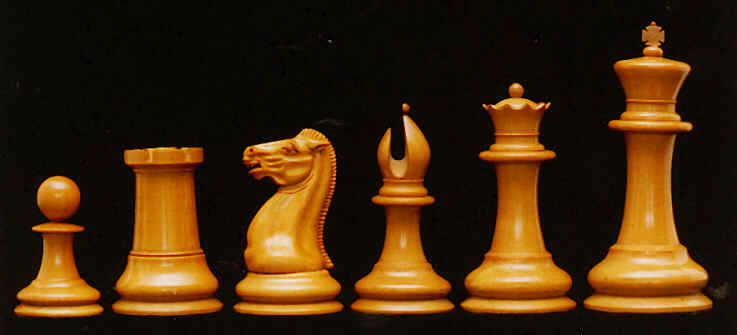
Original Staunton chess pieces, left to right: pawn, rook, knight, bishop, queen, and king

On 23 February 1849, Staunton married Frances Carpenter Nethersole, who had had eight children by a previous marriage.

In 1849, Nathaniel Cooke registered a chess set design, and Jaques of London obtained the manufacturing rights. Staunton advertised the new set in his Illustrated London News chess column, pointing out that the pieces were easily identifiable, very stable, and good-looking. Each box was signed by Staunton, and Staunton received a royalty on each set sold.

The design became popular, and has been the standard for both professional and amateur chess players ever since. Anthony Saidy and Norman Lessing wrote that, "if a vote was taken among chess-players as to which pieces they most enjoyed playing with, ... the Staunton chessmen would win by an overwhelming margin."

=== 1851, London International Tournament ===
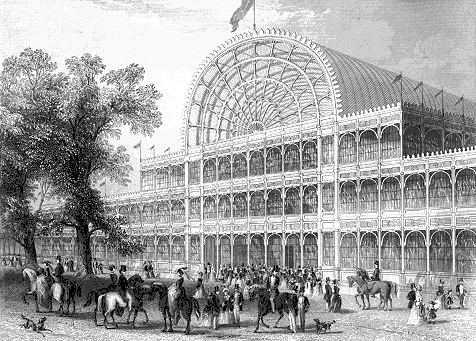
The front entrance of the Great Exhibition in Hyde Park, London

Staunton proposed and then took the lead in organising the first ever international tournament, as he thought the Great Exhibition of 1851 presented a unique opportunity, because the difficulties that obstructed international participation would be greatly reduced. He may also have been motivated by reports that a few years earlier Ludwig Bledow had proposed to organise an international tournament in Germany, whose winner was to be recognised as the world champion. Staunton and his colleagues had ambitious objectives for this tournament, including convening a "Chess Parliament" to complete the standardisation of various rules and procedures for competitive chess and for writing about chess. Staunton also proposed the production of a compendium showing what was known about chess openings, preferably as a table. Before the tournament started Captain Kennedy and the Liberty Weekly Tribune in Missouri wrote that the winner should be regarded as "the World's Chess Champion".

The organisers obtained financial contributions from Europe, the US and Asia, enabling the committee to set up a prize fund of £500, equivalent to about £359,000 in 2006's money. (Note: Conversion based on average incomes, which are the most appropriate measure for several days' hard work. If we use average prices for the conversion, the result is about £40,000.)

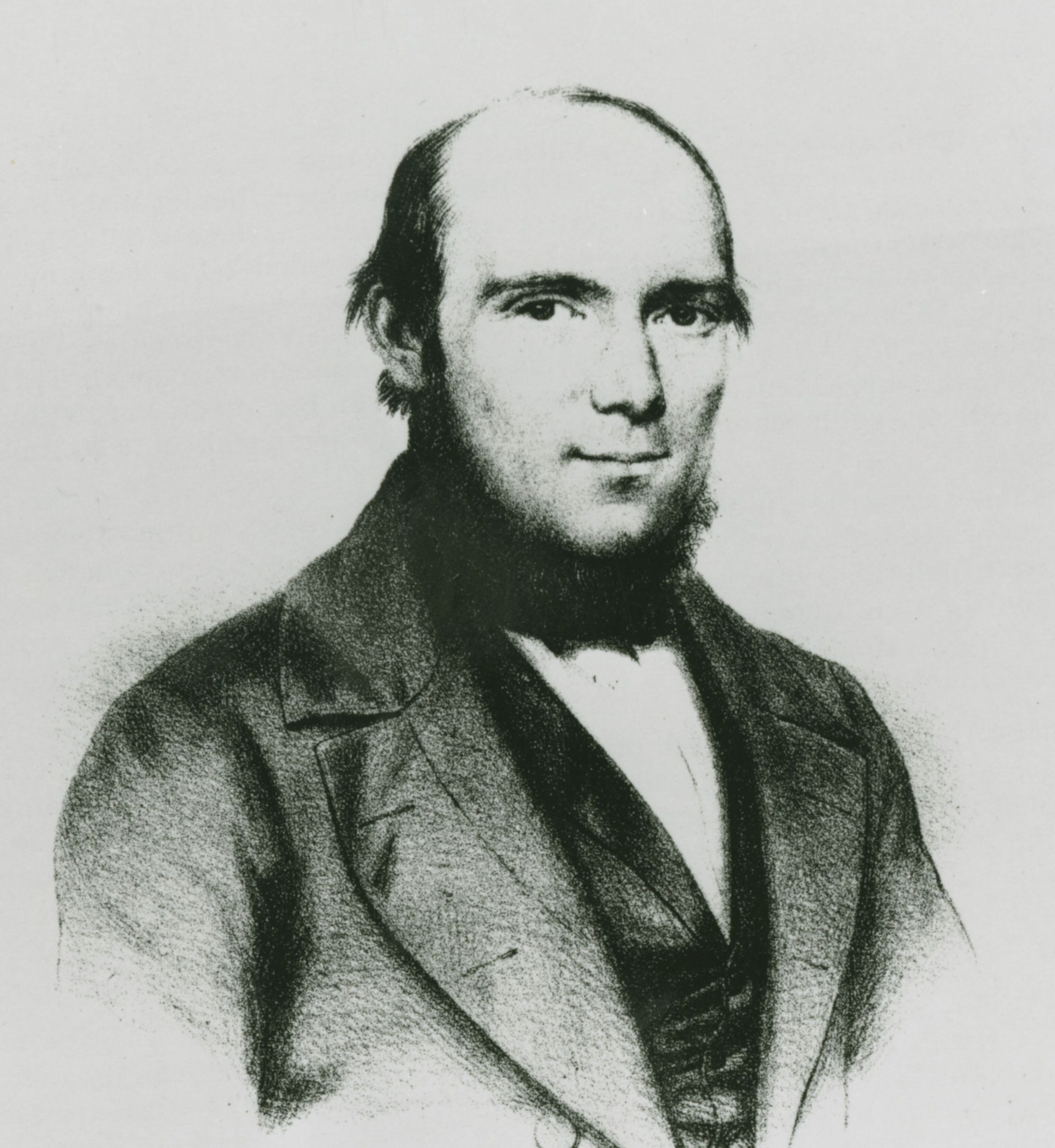
Adolf Anderssen

Despite the generally enthusiastic response, several major players were unable to participate, including von der Lasa, Saint-Amant and Cochrane. Adolf Anderssen was at first deterred by the travel costs, but accepted his invitation when Staunton offered to pay Anderssen's travel expenses out of his own pocket if necessary. The committee had also organised a "London Provincial Tournament" for other British players, and "promoted" some of the entrants to play in the International Tournament to obtain the right number of players for a knock-out tournament.

The tournament was a success, but disappointing for Staunton personally; in the second round he was knocked out by Anderssen, who won the tournament convincingly; and in the play-off for third place Staunton was narrowly beaten by Elijah Williams. (Note: Williams beat Staunton by one game in the match. This was before time controls were used and Staunton resigned a crucial game because he claimed that Williams was taking too long to move.) Staunton's defeat by Williams suggests that Staunton had over-stretched himself by acting as both a competitor and the Secretary of the organising committee.

The London Chess Club, which had fallen out with Staunton and his colleagues, organised a tournament that was played a month later and had a multi-national set of players (many of whom had competed in Staunton's tournament), and the result was the same: Anderssen won.

In 1852 Staunton published his book The Chess Tournament, which recounted in detail the efforts required to make the London International Tournament happen and presented all the games with his comments on the play. Some of Staunton's comments in the book and in The Illustrated London News were offensive, because he was disappointed with the placing he achieved.

=== 1852–1860, final stages of playing career and Shakespeare publication ===
Immediately after the London International tournament Staunton challenged Anderssen to a match of twenty-one games, for £100 (£14,874/US$18,355 in 2022 terms). Anderssen accepted the challenge but the match could not be arranged: Staunton was physically unfit for an immediate contest, and Anderssen had to return to work.

Carl Jaenisch had arrived too late for the tournament; Staunton convincingly won a match with him soon after (seven wins, one draw, and two losses). Later in 1851 Staunton played a match against Elijah Williams, who had won their play-off for third place in the London International tournament. Staunton won more games (six wins, three draws, and four losses) but lost the match because he had given Williams a three-game start.

In 1853, while trying to arrange a match against Anderssen, Staunton met von der Lasa in Brussels. The two began a match, but had to abandon it in the middle of the thirteenth game, with von der Lasa leading (five wins, four losses, and three draws). Staunton was unfit to continue because of heart palpitations, which had affected him in the second match against Saint-Amant in 1843. In von der Lasa's opinion there was no chance that Staunton's health would be good enough for a serious contest from 1853 onwards.

In the mid-1850s Staunton obtained a contract with the publishers Routledge to edit the text of Shakespeare. This edition appeared in parts from 1857 to 1860, and Staunton's work was praised by experts.

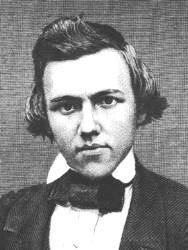
Paul Morphy

While Staunton was busy with the Shakespeare edition, he received a courteous letter from the New Orleans Chess Club, inviting him to that city to play Paul Morphy, who had won the recent First American Chess Congress. Staunton replied, thanking the New Orleans Chess Club and Morphy "for the honor implied in your selection of me as the opponent of such a champion" and pointing out that he had not competed for several years and was working six days a week (on editing Shakespeare), and that he could not possibly travel across the Atlantic for a match.

Staunton also wrote in The Illustrated London News that he had "been compelled, by laborious literary occupation, to abandon the practice of chess, beyond the indulgence of an occasional game ... . If Mr. Morphy – for whose skill we entertain the liveliest admiration – be desirous to win his spurs among the chess chivalry of Europe, he must take advantage of his purposed visit next year; he will then meet in this country, in France, in Germany and in Russia, many champions ... ready to test and do honor to his prowess." (Note: The full text of Staunton's letter was: "Gentlemen: In reply to your very courteous proposal for me to visit New Orleans for the purpose of encountering Mr. Paul Morphy at Chess, permit me to mention that for many years professional duties have compelled me to abandon the practice of the game almost entirely except in the most desultory manner, and at the present time these duties are so exacting that it is with difficulty I am enabled to snatch one day out of seven for exercise and relaxation. Under the circumstances you will at once perceive that a long and arduous chess contest, even in this Metropolis, would be an enterprise too formidable for me to embark in without ample opportunity for the recovery of my old strength in play, together with such arrangements as would prevent the sacrifice of my professional engagements for the sake of a match at chess, and that the idea of undertaking one in a foreign country, many thousand miles from here, is admissible only in a dream. With friendly greetings to my proposed antagonist, whose talent and enthusiasm no one can more highly estimate, and with compliments to you for the honour implied in your selection of me as the opponent of such a champion, I beg to subscribe myself, with every consideration. Yours obediently, H. Staunton")

Chess historian H. J. R. Murray wrote that Staunton's letter and article should have been interpreted as a courteous refusal of the offer, but that Morphy interpreted them differently, and one of the main reasons for his visit to Europe in 1858 was the hope of playing a match with Staunton. Some other chess historians disagree with Murray's interpretation of Staunton's response. Staunton did offer to play Morphy by electric telegraph, a technology whose progress and uses for chess he reported enthusiastically. However this offer arrived after Morphy had left for Europe – which perhaps was fortunate, as the newly laid cable broke down after a month and was not replaced until 1866.

Upon arriving in England in June 1858, Morphy promptly challenged Staunton to a match. At first, Staunton declined Morphy's offer saying that the challenge came too late. Morphy did not give up negotiations and urging Staunton to play. In early July Staunton agreed provided he was given time to get back into practice on openings and endgames, and provided that he could manage all this without breaking the publication contract for his Shakespearean work. In early August, Morphy wrote asking Staunton when the match could occur, and Staunton asked again for a delay of some weeks.

Staunton did compete in a tournament in Birmingham, that started on 22 August, but it was a knock-out tournament, and he was eliminated in the second round by Johann Löwenthal after playing a total of four games. This was to be Staunton's last public chess competition. H.J.R. Murray wrote that Staunton had overexerted himself and damaged his health by trying both to get ahead of schedule on the Shakespeare project and to play some competitive chess.

Just before Staunton left London for Birmingham, his old enemy George Walker had published an article accusing him of trying to delay the match indefinitely, and Staunton received another letter from Morphy pressing him to name a date for the match. Staunton and Morphy met socially in Birmingham and, after a tense discussion, Staunton agreed to play in early November. Just after the tournament a letter signed by "Anti-book" appeared in Staunton's column in The Illustrated London News, alleging that Morphy did not actually have the money for his share of the stakes. This letter is widely thought to have been written by Staunton himself; if so, he must have written it immediately after reading Walker's article and Morphy's letter and immediately before leaving for Birmingham.

Around this time Morphy wrote to friends in the U.S. asking them to obtain the stake money for the Staunton match. Morphy's family refused to contribute as they "should not allow him to play a money match either with his own money or anyone else's", but the New Orleans Chess Club sent £500. Meanwhile, Morphy went to Paris to play against continental masters. In September The Illustrated London News printed both a complimentary full-page article about Morphy and a complimentary mention of him in its chess column. On 6 October 1858, while in Paris, Morphy wrote Staunton an open letter which was also circulated to several publications, in which Morphy complained about Staunton's conduct. Staunton replied on 9 October, re-stating the difficulties he faced, but now giving them as reasons to cancel the match. On 23 October, Staunton published his entire reply along with a partial copy of Morphy's open letter, omitting the reference to the "anti-book" letter.

Various chess columns then printed anonymous and acrimonious letters. Morphy took no part in any of this, but wrote to Lord Lyttelton, the president of the British Chess Association, explaining his own efforts to bring about the match, accusing Staunton of avoiding the match by all means short of admitting he did not wish to play, complaining about Staunton's representation of the facts in The Illustrated London News, and demanding "that you shall declare to the world it is through no fault of mine that this match has not taken place." Lyttelton replied that it was reasonable for Staunton to decline the match, but that in his opinion Staunton should have done so plainly in his first letter to America, but had instead often given the impression that he would soon be ready to start the match.

=== Later life ===
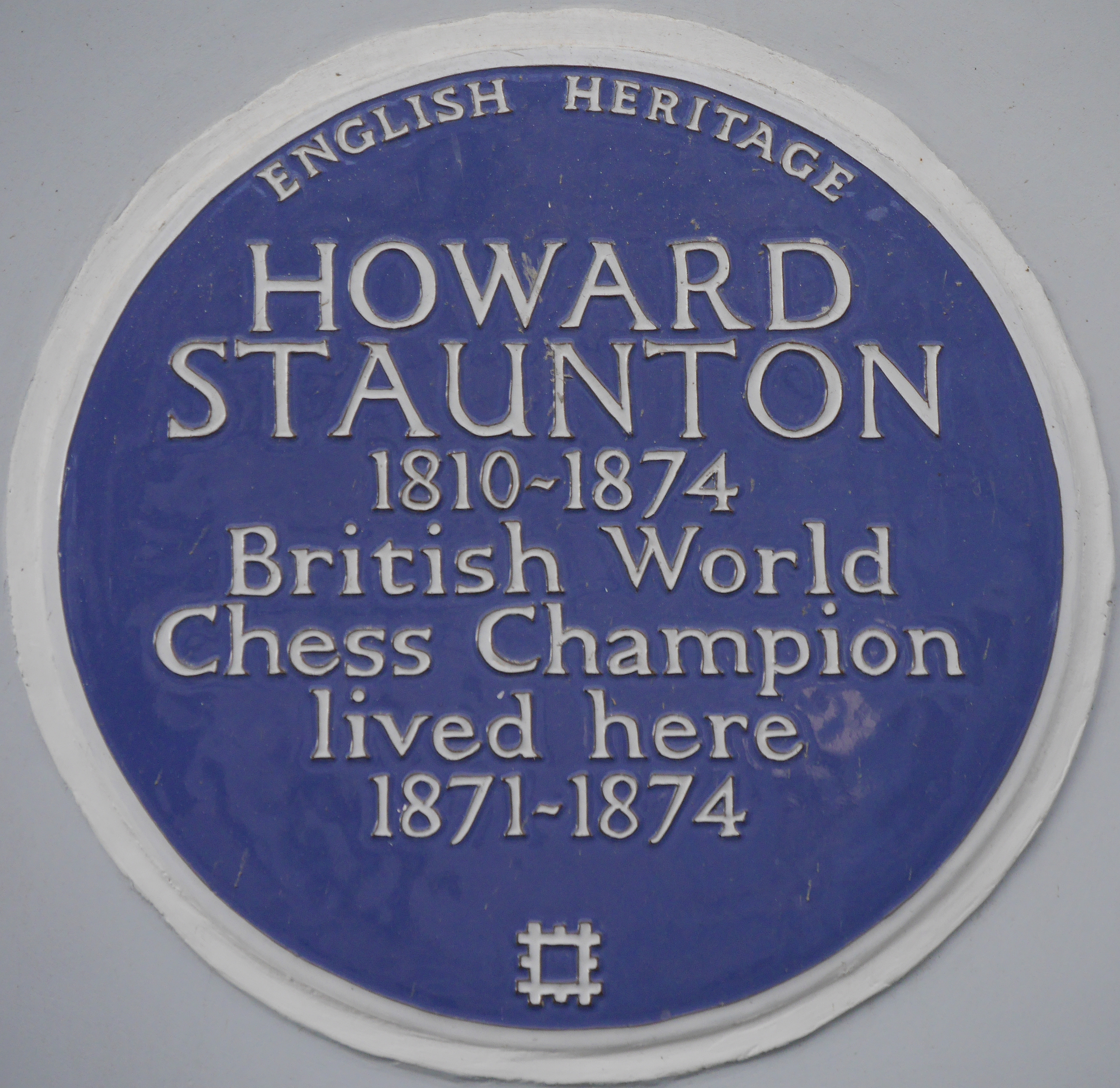
Blue plaque, 117 Lansdowne Road, London

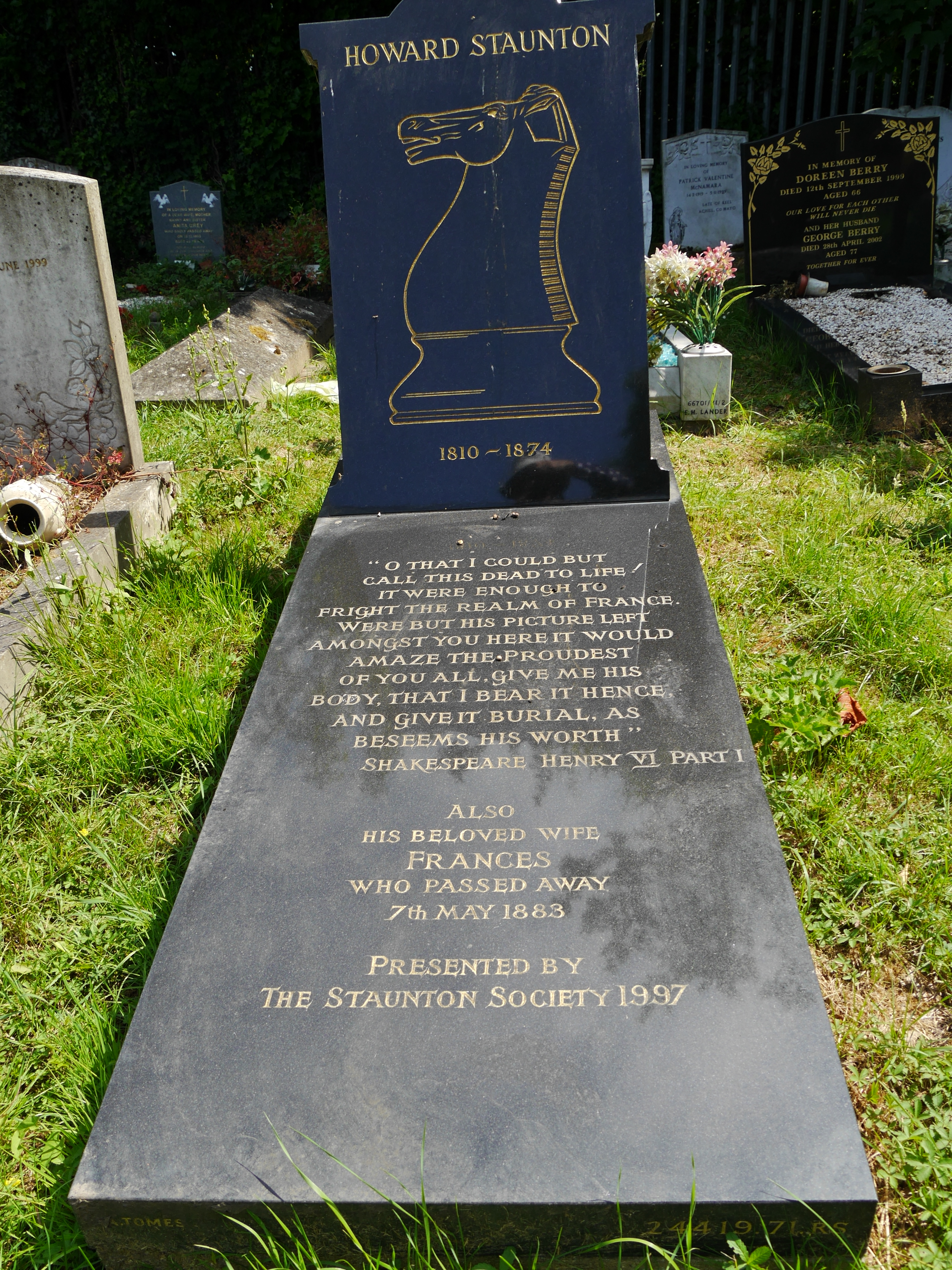
Monument, Kensal Green Cemetery, London

Staunton continued writing the chess column in The Illustrated London News until his death in 1874, greeting new developments with enthusiasm. In 1860 he published Chess Praxis, a supplement to his 1847 work The Chess Player's Handbook. The new book devoted 168 pages to presenting many of Morphy's games and praised the American's play.

Five years later Staunton published Great Schools of England (1865), whose main subject was the history of major English public schools but which also presented some progressive ideas: Learning can only take place successfully if the active interest of the student is engaged; corporal punishment is to be avoided and fagging should be abolished.

Most of Staunton's later life was occupied in writing about Shakespeare, including: A photolithographic reproduction of the 1600 Quarto of Much Ado about Nothing in 1864 and of the First Folio of Shakespeare in 1866; and papers on Unsuspected corruptions of Shakespeare's text, published from 1872 to his death. All these works were highly regarded at the time.

When he died suddenly of heart disease, on 22 June 1874, he was at his desk writing one of these papers. At the same time he was also working on his last chess book, Chess: Theory and Practice, which was published posthumously in 1876.

A memorial plaque now hangs at his old residence of 117 Lansdowne Road, London. In 1997 a memorial stone bearing an engraving of a chess knight was raised over his grave at Kensal Green Cemetery in London, which had previously been unmarked and neglected.

== Assessment ==
Staunton has been a controversial figure ever since his own time. In the words of chess journalist Mark Weeks, "Staunton represents a unique challenge to chess history. Many players immediately associate his name with Paul Morphy, as in 'Staunton ducked a match with Morphy'. ... This is extremely unfair, as it concentrates the focus on Staunton to a relatively minor, factually controversial incident, while it ignores his significant achievements." As chess historian Edward Winter writes, "The issue of national bias does, unfortunately, require consideration in the Staunton–Morphy affair." Chess historian Dale Brandreth makes a similar point, from an American perspective:

the fact is that the British have always had their "thing" about Morphy. They just can't seem to accept that Staunton was an unmitigated bastard in his treatment of Morphy because he knew damned well he could never have made any decent showing against him in a match.

However, Frederick Edge (1830–1882) and Philip W. Sergeant (1872–1952), two of Staunton's harshest critics, were British, while former world champion Bobby Fischer (1943–2008), one of the biggest fans of both Staunton and Morphy, was American.

=== Staunton–Morphy controversy ===
Chess historians trace much of the 20th century animosity against Staunton to books by Sergeant about Morphy. Sergeant in turn relied on a book by Edge, who accompanied Morphy to Europe in 1858 as his secretary and personal assistant, but returned to the U.S. in January 1859, a few months before Morphy. Opinions of Edge's value as a historical source vary widely:

- American chess journalist Daniel Willard Fiske, reviewing Edge's book, commented, "Mr. Morphy expressly disclaims any connection with it in any way or manner. ... will afford the reader a half-hour's entertainment".
- Sergeant's books and David Lawson's Paul Morphy: The pride and sorrow of chess (New York, 1976) make extensive use of Edge's book, but note Edge's strong anti-Staunton bias. Lawson also suggests that Morphy had seen the manuscript of Edge's book, disliked its treatment of the Staunton affair so much that he disavowed it, and objected to Edge's treatment of other matters.
- Chess historians H. J. R. Murray, David Hooper and Ken Whyld described Edge as unreliable and having an extreme bias against Staunton.

E. G. Winter summarized the situation by writing:

The word "liar" has been applied to [Edge] by a small number of (English, notably) authors, but what is the precise basis? That he was anti-Staunton is incontestable, but was being anti-Staunton a sign of mendacity, prejudice or, for that matter, clear-sightedness?

Edge's letters to Fiske show that Edge regarded Morphy as lazy and rather helpless, and himself as the one who would make Morphy's name immortal, and that Morphy wanted to keep the negotiations with Staunton discreet while Edge insisted on making them as public as possible.

H. J. R. Murray wrote that Staunton's response to Morphy's initial challenge and his article about the same in The Illustrated London News should have been interpreted as a courteous refusal of the offer, but that Morphy interpreted them differently, and one of the main reasons for his visit to Europe in 1858 was the hope of playing a match with Staunton. Murray also commented on the whole affair:

In all this there is but little in which we can reproach Staunton, beyond the fact that he kept open the possibility of a match for so long, and even here there is a good deal that could be urged in justification of the course followed by Staunton

but also noted that both sides were playing tactical games with each other in front of the public, and that comments made by both players or their respective supporters were acrimonious.

In response to Morphy's complaints Lord Lyttelton, then president of the British Chess Association, said that it was reasonable for Staunton to decline the match, but that in his opinion Staunton should have done so plainly in his first letter to America, but had instead often given the impression that he would soon be ready to start the match. von der Lasa later wrote, although not specifically about this affair, that he thought there was no chance of Staunton's health being good enough for a serious contest from 1853 onwards. William Norwood Potter wrote in his obituary of Staunton in the City of London Chess Magazine

... nor were his innuendoes concerning Morphy otherwise than an utterly unworthy means of getting out of an engagement, which he could have either declined with a good grace at first, or afterwards have honourably asked to be released from. Nevertheless, all said and done, Staunton was, as we have often heard a distinguished enemy of his say, emphatically a man. There was nothing weak about him, and he had a backbone that never curved with fear of any one.

Some 20th century commentators have been more critical of Staunton. However some well-known chess writers, including Fred Reinfeld, Israel "Al" Horowitz and Reuben Fine, have been criticised by chess historians for their inaccuracy, both in general and specifically where Staunton is concerned. Edward Winter writes, "It is unwise for the 'non-playing' historian to publish his own analysis, although he may be a useful compiler. Similarly, players who are unversed in, and indifferent to, chess history should not touch it."

William Hartston wrote of Staunton's non-match with Morphy:

Sadly, this blemish on Staunton the man also did considerable harm to the reputation among later generations of Staunton the chess player.

G. H. Diggle wrote in the British Chess Magazine:

That [Staunton] excused himself ... from playing a match against the greatest player of the century, then at the zenith of his youth and fame, was no tragedy for chess. The contest would have been a fiasco. But it would have been happier, both for the young champion and the old, had the latter never said he would play at all.

=== Playing strength and style ===
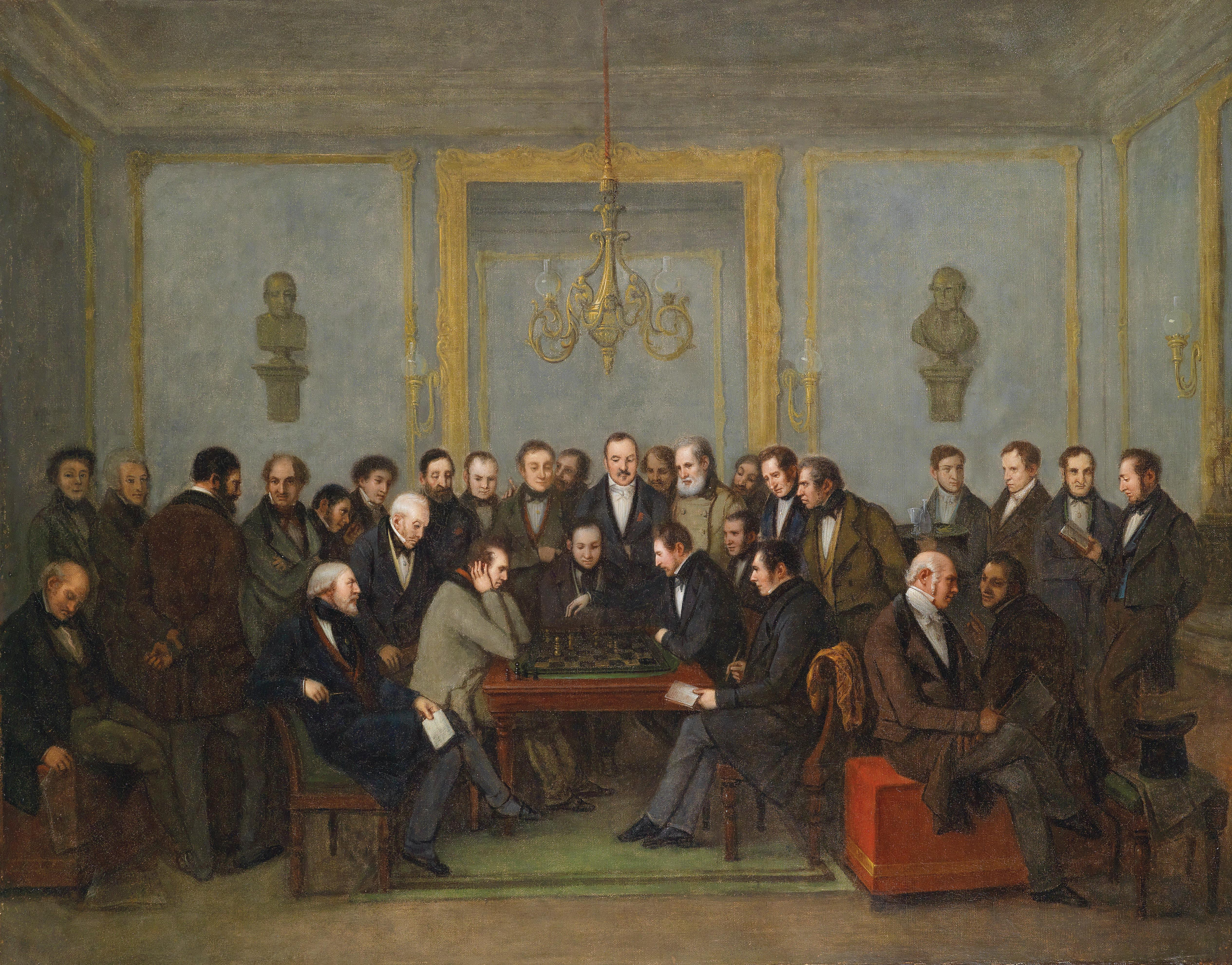
A depiction of the chess match between Howard Staunton and Pierre Charles Fourrier Saint-Amant, on 16 December 1843

There is a famous story that Paul Morphy described Staunton as the author of "some devilish bad games". Chess historian Edward Winter traced this back to a book published in 1902, whose author said he had seen a copy of Staunton's The Chess Tournament in which Morphy had written "some devilish bad games" on the title page; Winter was unable to trace the copy. Around the time of Staunton's death, Morphy is said to have commented that Staunton may have been the strongest player of his time, had great analytical ability and judgement of positions, but lacked the imagination required to deliberately create opportunities for combinations.

Twentieth-century opinions of Staunton's play varied enormously. Fred Reinfeld, Al Horowitz, and Reuben Fine all condemned it. In his book The World of Chess, Anthony Saidy refused to reprint a single Staunton game and said his style of play was mostly about the acquisition of material rather than strategic or analytical brilliance.

On the other hand, Savielly Tartakower wrote, "A remarkable feature of Staunton's play is the number of ultra-modern ideas with which he was familiar, e.g. the restricted centre, the fianchetto development, bilateral work, the theory of the local engagement, etc., and, last but not least, the English Opening (sometimes called the Staunton Opening)." Garry Kasparov considered Staunton "by the early 1840s ... superior to all his rivals". Bobby Fischer opined that "Staunton was the most profound opening analyst of all time. He was more theorist than player, but nonetheless he was the strongest player of his day ... . In addition, he understood all of the positional concepts which modern players hold dear, and thus – with Steinitz – must be considered the first modern player."

The website Chessmetrics ranks Staunton as world number one from May 1843 to August 1849, in the top ten from July 1851 to May 1853, and in the top five from June 1853 to January 1856.

From the early 1840s–1851 Staunton could successfully give odds to almost any UK-based player, including eventually John Cochrane; the exceptions were Henry Thomas Buckle, to whom Staunton gave pawn and move in 1843 and lost their match (6 losses, no draws, 1 win), and Elijah Williams in 1851, against whom Staunton won more games, but lost the match because he had given Williams a 3-game start. According to match records collected by Jeremy P. Spinrad, the only players who were successful against Staunton without receiving odds from 1840 to 1852 were:

- Saint-Amant, who won their first match in London in 1843 and lost their second, longer match in Paris the same year;
- Adolf Anderssen, who eliminated Staunton from the 1851 London International tournament; and
- Elijah Williams, who beat Staunton in the play-off for third place in the same tournament.

Before 1840 Staunton was still a relative beginner, and after 1851 his health was too fragile for serious competition. In the late 1840s some UK commentators wrote that Buckle was stronger, and von der Lasa was regarded by some as the world's best. Staunton did not play von der Lasa until 1853, and was forced by ill-health to abandon the match.

In his own time Staunton was regarded as belonging to the "closed" category of chess players (along with for example Philidor and József Szén) rather than to the "heroic" category (which included La Bourdonnais, Morphy, and Anderssen) – instead of seeking immediate combat, Staunton deferred it until he was ready. The closed English Opening got its name from Staunton's frequent use of it, especially against Saint-Amant in 1843. However he was noted for the accuracy and incisiveness of his combinations.

=== Personality ===
Staunton's virtues and defects were both on a large scale. Former world champion Garry Kasparov commented that Staunton "founded and edited the magazine Chess Player's Chronicle ... wrote a chess column (1845–1874), studied opening theory ... published four remarkable books ... endorsed the famous 'Staunton pieces' ... organized the first international chess tournament in history ... ." However, British International Master William Hartston wrote that Staunton's many achievements were done "with the full weight of an arrogant and pompous nature which has scarcely been matched in the history of the game."

Even contemporaries sympathetic to Staunton admitted that he could be spiteful in response to unexpected defeats, and to proposals or arguments that he considered ill-founded or malicious. Staunton had a highly volatile relationship with George Walker, the founder of the London Chess Club, a dedicated populariser of chess, and one of Staunton's earliest supporters.

Chess journalism could be a bruising business in those days, even when Staunton was not involved. However it does seem that Staunton was involved in more than his fair share of chess disputes.

Staunton's enemies gave as good as they got.

H. J. R. Murray suggested that these frequent wars of words may have originated from leading players' and commentators' jealousy over Staunton's unexpected rise to the top in the early 1840s, and from snobbish disdain about his humble and possibly illegitimate birth. Saidy and Lessing wrote that, "He can hardly be blamed if the struggles and privations of his youth warped his character so that he became a jealous, suspicious, and vitriolic man."

On the other hand, Staunton's often-criticized description of Anderssen as Germany's second best player, after Anderssen had won the 1851 London International tournament, may have been reasonable on the basis of what is now known about von der Lasa's skill. Staunton was sometimes an objective chess commentator: A large percentage of his 1860 book Chess Praxis was devoted to Morphy's games, which he praised highly; and in The Chess-Player's Companion (1849) Staunton sometimes criticised his own play, and presented a few of his losses.

Staunton showed excellent management skills in building the team to organise the 1851 London International tournament, and determination and resourcefulness in overcoming the difficulties of getting enough competitors. He also maintained good working relationships with important players and enthusiasts, for example: Popert and Cochrane helped him to prepare for his second match against Saint-Amant; Captain Evans agreed to be one of his seconds in that match and later helped Staunton to organise the 1845 telegraphic match; the Calcutta Chess Club contributed £100 to help finance the London International Tournament in 1851, and in addition its principal officers Cochrane and T. C. Morton made two of the four largest personal contributions; Staunton corresponded with von der Lasa for over 30 years, although they only met once; Staunton's last letter to von der Lasa, November 1873, expressed his sorrow at the deaths of various masters and enthusiasts, including Saint-Amant, and especially Carl Jaenisch.

In conversation Staunton was charming and witty.

Despite the disappointing way in which his playing career ended, Staunton continued to write with enthusiasm about the progress of new technologies, players, and developments in chess theory. His last book, Chess: Theory and Practice, was sufficiently complete at the time of his death to be published posthumously in 1876, and it was described as up-to-date fourteen years after his death.

=== Influence on chess ===
Staunton proposed and was the principal organiser of the first international chess tournament, which proved that such events were possible, and which produced a clear consensus on who was the world's strongest player – Adolf Anderssen. All subsequent international tournaments took place in Great Britain until Paris 1867.

Contemporaries, including Steinitz and Morphy, regarded Staunton's writings on chess openings as among the best of their time. Staunton's Chess-Player's Handbook (1847) immediately became the leading English-language chess textbook. It went through twenty-one reprints by 1935, spawned several imitators, and remained in print (in a revised edition) until the 1940s.

Around 1888 Staunton's Chess: Theory and Practice, published posthumously in 1876, was regarded as modern in most respects, but there was a growing need for more up-to-date analysis of openings. (Note: "[A]s time passed a demand arose for more up-to-date works in English, an example of which is Freeborough and Ranken's Chess Openings (1889) which had four editions up to 1910".)

Staunton's obituary in The City of London Chess Magazine said:

... his literary labours are the basis upon which English Chess Society ... stands.

His play, however, had little influence on other players of the day. William Hartston explains that

... his chess understanding was so far ahead of his time. A deep strategist living in an era when shallow tactics were still the rule, Staunton's conceptions could not be assimilated by his contemporaries.

Staunton's style and the openings that accompanied it were eclipsed by the more directly aggressive styles of Anderssen and Morphy, which dominated chess from 1851 until Steinitz unveiled his positional approach in 1873.

Position: a8 black rook, b8 black knight, c8 black bishop, d8 black queen, e8 black king, f8 black bishop, g8 black knight, h8 black rook, a7 black pawn, b7 black pawn, d7 black pawn, e7 black pawn, f7 black pawn, g7 black pawn, h7 black pawn, c5 black pawn, e4 white pawn, a2 white pawn, b2 white pawn, c2 white pawn, d2 white pawn, f2 white pawn, g2 white pawn, h2 white pawn, a1 white rook, b1 white knight, c1 white bishop, d1 white queen, e1 white king, f1 white bishop, g1 white knight, h1 white rook

Staunton advocated the Sicilian Defence, 1...c5 in reply to 1.e4.

There is little evidence that Staunton had much direct influence on modern chess. Although he introduced the English Opening, it has been called "really a 20th century invention" that only became fully respectable after future world champion Mikhail Botvinnik began playing it in the 1930s. Similarly, although Staunton was an early champion of the Sicilian Defense, which is today the most popular opening, and the most successful response to 1.e4, (Note: New in Chess stated in its 2000 Yearbook that of the games in its database, White scored 56.1% with 1.d4, but two per cent less (54.1%) with 1.e4, primarily because of the Sicilian, against which White scored only 52.3%. New in Chess Yearbook 55 (2000), p. 227. A graph similar to that in the 2000 Yearbook can be found at.) Staunton seems to have had little influence on how the Sicilian is played today: He regarded it as a safe defensive line, while it is now treated as a vigorous but slightly risky counterattack. (Note: Staunton wrote that the Sicilian "... is the best possible reply to the move of 1. P. to K's 4th, 'as it renders the formation of a centre impracticable for White and prevents every attack.' " However, Grandmaster John Nunn wrote in 2001 that the Sicilian is now popular because "... Black is playing not just for equality, but for the advantage ... Black has to take care not to fall victim to a quick attack." On the other hand, Raymond Keene wrote that "Taimanov ... revived some old, forgotten ideas of Staunton ..." in the Sicilian.)

Position: a8 black rook, b8 black knight, c8 black bishop, d8 black queen, e8 black king, f8 black bishop, h8 black rook, a7 black pawn, b7 black pawn, c7 black pawn, e7 black pawn, g7 black pawn, h7 black pawn, f6 black knight, d5 black pawn, f5 black pawn, d4 white pawn, g4 white pawn, h3 white pawn, a2 white pawn, b2 white pawn, c2 white pawn, e2 white pawn, f2 white pawn, a1 white rook, b1 white knight, c1 white bishop, d1 white queen, e1 white king, f1 white bishop, g1 white knight, h1 white rook

Staunton's "spike" gambit against the Dutch Defence. Staunton and modern GMs agree that Black gets a good game after 1.d4 f5 2.h3 Nf6 3.g4 d5!

Staunton introduced the Staunton Gambit against the Dutch Defence (1.d4 f5 2.e4!?). Although it was once a feared attacking line, (Note: "The Staunton Gambit ... offers White considerable attacking chances." Fine, R.; Griffith, R.C.; White, J.H. (1939). Modern Chess Openings (6th ed.). David McKay. p. 176. The Staunton Gambit gives White "sharp attacking chances for his Pawn" and places the opponent at a psychological disadvantage ..." Horowitz, I.A. (1964). Chess Openings: Theory and practice. Simon and Schuster. p. 611. Fear of the Staunton Gambit has discouraged many players from using the Dutch. Christiansen, L.; Silman, J. (1989). The Dutch Defense. Chess Digest. p. 192. ISBN 0-87568-178-6. Schiller, E.; Colias, Bill (1993). How to Play Black Against the Staunton Gambit. Chess Digest. p. 4. ISBN 0-87568-236-7.) it has been out of favour since the mid-1920s, (Note: The Staunton Gambit "has fallen out of favour for no clear reason". Griffith, R.C.; White, J.H.; Goldstein, M.E. (1925). Modern Chess Openings (4th ed.). Whitehead & Miller. p. 120. "The Staunton Gambit fell out of favour some time ago and still remains so ... ." Fine, R.; Griffith, R.C.; White, J.H. (1939). Modern Chess Openings (6th ed.). David McKay. p. 176. The Staunton Gambit "is not in much favor today". de Firmian, N. (2008). Modern Chess Openings, 15th edition. Random House. p. 494. ISBN 978-0-8129-3682-7.) and is thought to "offer White equality at best". Staunton also analysed a different gambit approach to the Dutch, 2.h3 followed by g4. In 1979 Viktor Korchnoi, one of the world's leading players, successfully introduced this line into top-class competition, but later authorities concluded, as Staunton had, that Black gets a good game with 2...Nf6 3.g4 d5!

Staunton also advocated the Ponziani Opening 1.e4 e5 2.Nf3 Nc6 3.c3, which was often called "Staunton's Opening". It is rarely played today because it allows Black to choose between a sharp counterattack and a safe line that usually leads to a draw.

=== His other writings ===
Staunton's edition of Shakespeare's plays was respected.

== Staunton Memorial Tournament ==
Between 2003 and 2009, a Howard Staunton Memorial Tournament was held at Simpson's-in-the-Strand, London, a restaurant which Staunton regularly visited in the 19th century to play and discuss chess (it was then a coffee house known as "The Divan" or "Simpson's Divan"). The 2008 tournament was the strongest to be held in London since 1986.

== Tournament results ==
Date	Location	Place	Score	Notes
1851	London International Tournament	4	---	A knockout tournament in which the contestants played mini-matches in each round, increasing from best-of-three in the first round to best-of-eight in the final. Staunton was eliminated in the semifinal (−4=0+1) by Adolf Anderssen, who won the tournament. Staunton was then beaten by Elijah Williams in the play-off for third place.
1858	Birmingham	---	---	A knockout tournament in which the contestants played three-game mini-matches in each round. Staunton was eliminated in the second round (−2=0+0) by the eventual winner, Johann Jacob Löwenthal.

== Match results ==
Notes:

1. In some cases it is known who won but not by what score.
2. Books and articles about most players often omit games at odds. But Staunton gave odds, usually successfully, in his matches against most UK-based players and most of his matches were played this way.
3. "P + 1" means "Pawn and move", "P + 2" means "Pawn and two moves".
4. In the second column of scores, "+" shows games Staunton won, "–" shows his losses, "=" shows draws.

Date	Opponent	Result	Odds	Location	Score		Notes
1838	Alexandre	Lost	none	London	N/A	N/A	
1840	Popert	Won	none	London	13/21	+8 =2 –3	
1841	Stanley	Lost	P + 2	London	2½/6	+2 =1 –3	
1843	Zytogorski	Lost	P + 2	N/A	½/7	+0 =1 –6	(Note: The only evidence for this match was a claim by Brien in the Chess Player's Chronicle in 1855, after Brien and Zytogorski had fallen out with Staunton, and the result is considered unlikely by chess historians such as Philip Walsingham Sergeant and Tim Harding.)
1843	Cochrane	Won	none	London	14/18	+14 =0 –4	(Note: Sources disagree about how many games should be counted and whether there was more than one match. Some sources say there was a short match in which Staunton gave Cochrane odds of pawn and one move and drew, followed by a normal match that Staunton won by one game: "Scores of various important chess results from the Romantic era". Archived from the original on 28 May 2008.; H. J. R. Murray says they played about 120 games, Staunton scoring about 80/120, and that finally Staunton gave Cochrane P + 1 and scored +3 =1 –3: Murray, H.J.R. (November 1908). "Howard Staunton: Part I". British Chess Magazine. Archived from the original on 8 December 2007.; Murray, H.J.R. (November 1908). "Howard Staunton: Part II". British Chess Magazine. Archived from the original on 8 December 2007.; Chessmetrics treats all their games as one single match and lists it as Staunton's best performance: "Chessmetrics Player Profile: Howard Staunton".)
1843	Taverner	Won	P + 2	N/A	5/6	???	
1843	Saint-Amant	Lost	none	London	2½/6	+2 =1 –3	
1843	Brooke-Greville	Lost	P + 1	N/A	0/3	+0 =0 –3	
1843	Brooke-Greville	Won	P + 2	N/A	5/6	+5 =0 –1	
1843	Buckle	Lost	P + 1	London	1/3	+1 =0 –6	
1843	Saint-Amant	Won	none	Paris	13/21	+11 =4 –6	
1844	Tuckett	Won	P + 2	N/A	7½/9	+7 =1 –1	
1845	Tuckett	Won	P + 2	N/A	7½/9	+7 =1 –1	
1845	Mongredien	Won	P + 2	N/A	3½/5	+2 =3 –0	
1845	Spreckley	Won	P + 2	N/A	3½/5	+3 =1 –1	
1845	Williams	Won	P + 2	N/A	3½/4	+3 =1 –0	
1845	Kennedy	Won	P + 2	N/A	8½/11	+7 =2 –2	
1846	Horwitz	Won	none	London	15½/24	+14 =3 –7	
1846	Hannah	Won	Q Knight	N/A	5½/8	+5 =1 –2	
1846	Daniel Harrwitz	Won	none	London	7/7	+7 =0 –1	(Note: The three Harrwitz matches may have been one complicated contest.)
1846	Daniel Harrwitz	Lost	P + 1	London	1½/8	+1 =1 –6	
1846	Daniel Harrwitz	Won	P + 2	London	4/7	+4 =0 –3	
1847	Kenny	Drawn	Q Rook	N/A	2/4	+2 =0 –2	
1847	Loewe	Lost	P + 2	N/A	2/7	+1 =2 –4	
1847	Medley	Won	P + 2	N/A	7½/10	+6 =3 –1	
1851	Carl Jaenisch	Won	none	London	7½/10	+7 =1 –2	
1851	Elijah Williams	Lost	none	London	7½/13	+6 =3 –4	(Note: Although Staunton won more games, he lost the match because he had given Williams a three-game start.)
1853	von der Lasa	Lost	none	Brussels	5½/12	+4 =4 –5	(Note: In von der Lasa's account, he describes the meeting as just a long series of games, played while they were in the same place, that ended due to Staunton's illness.)
1854	Brien	N/A	P + 2	N/A	N/A	N/A	
1859	Worrall	Won	Q Knight	N/A	7½/10	+6 =3 –1	

== Bibliography ==
- Shakespeare, William (1858–1860). Staunton, H. (ed.). Plays. illustrations by John Gilbert, engraved by the Brothers Dalziel. London: George Routledge & Co. OCLC 50447723.
- Staunton, H. (1847). The Chess Player's Handbook. London: Henry G. Bohn. OCLC 9171272. "A popular and scientific introduction to the game of chess"
- Staunton, H. (1849). The Chess-player's Companion.
- Staunton, H. (1849). The Chess-player's Text-book.
- Staunton, H. (1852). The Chess Tournament.
- Staunton, H. (1860). Chess Praxis.
- Staunton, H. (1865). The Great Schools of England. London: Sampson Low, Son, & Marston. OCLC 4143800. "An Account of the Foundation, Endowments, and Discipline of the Chief Seminaries of Learning in England"
- Staunton, H. (1876). Chess: Theory and practice.
- Staunton, H. (1876). The Laws and Practice of Chess.

It is unclear if The Laws and Practice of Chess is a second edition of Chess: Theory and Practice, or a completely different book.

== See also ==
- List of chess games
