= Vincent Grimm =

Hungarian chess player

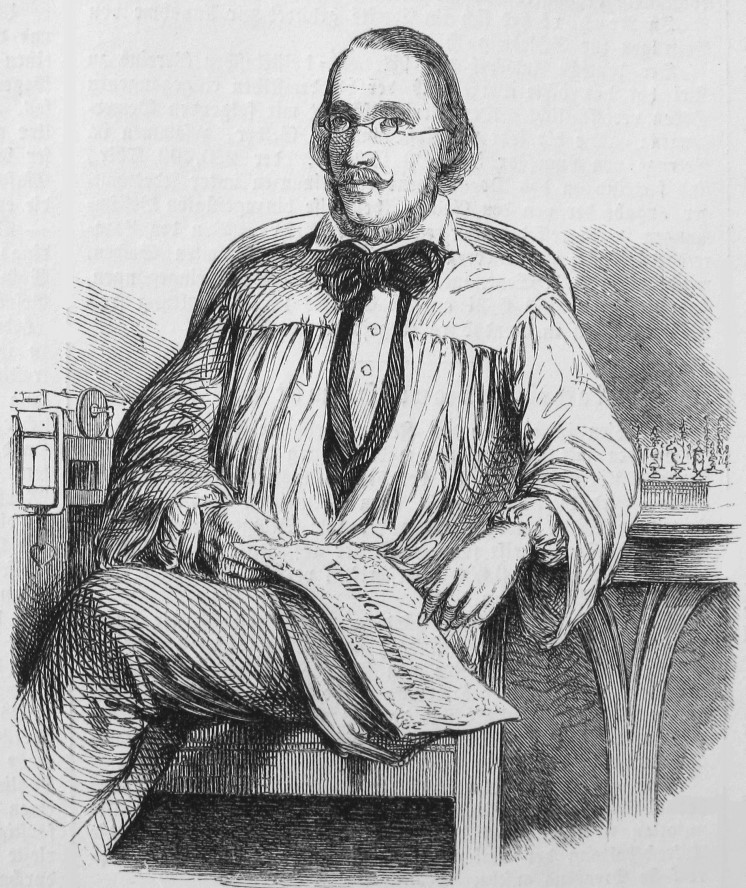
Portrait of Vincent Grimm. Wood engraving from 1850 from the Elke Rehder collection.

Vincent (Vincenz, Vince) Grimm (1800, Vienna – 15 January 1872, Budapest) was a Hungarian chess master.

Born in Vienna, he moved to Pest, Hungary in 1823. Grimm had a wide variety of professions and hobbies throughout his life. He was an artist, an art dealer, a pianist, a linguist, a well known billiards master, a gifted drawer, consequently a lithographer and a cartographer. He was also a president of the Pesth (later Budapest) Chess Club which was founded in 1839. Grimm, along with József Szén, Johann Löwenthal, J. Oppenheim, the Zenner brothers, and other players from city of Pesth won a chess correspondence match against Paris between 1842 and 1846, and scored a shocking 2–0 victory, while introducing the Hungarian Defense: 1.e4 e5 2.Nf3 Nc6 3.Bc4 Be7.

Grimm received an invitation to compete in the London 1851 chess tournament. He, however, had been involved in the Hungarian Revolution of 1848 against the Habsburg Empire, and was arrested for printing and distributing subversive literature - the famous Kossuth bank notes. He was exiled in Aleppo, Syria (then Ottoman Empire), and was unable to take his place in the tournament. In Syria/Turkey, he converted to Islam, and changed his name to either Murad Bey or Mustafa Bey. He returned to Hungary in 1868.

His name is attached to the Grimm Attack in the King's Gambit, Bishop's Gambit (C33): 1.e4 e5 2.f4 exf4 3.Bc4 Qh4+ 4.Kf1 g5 5.Nc3 Bg7 6.d4 d6 7.e5.
