= London 1851 chess tournament =

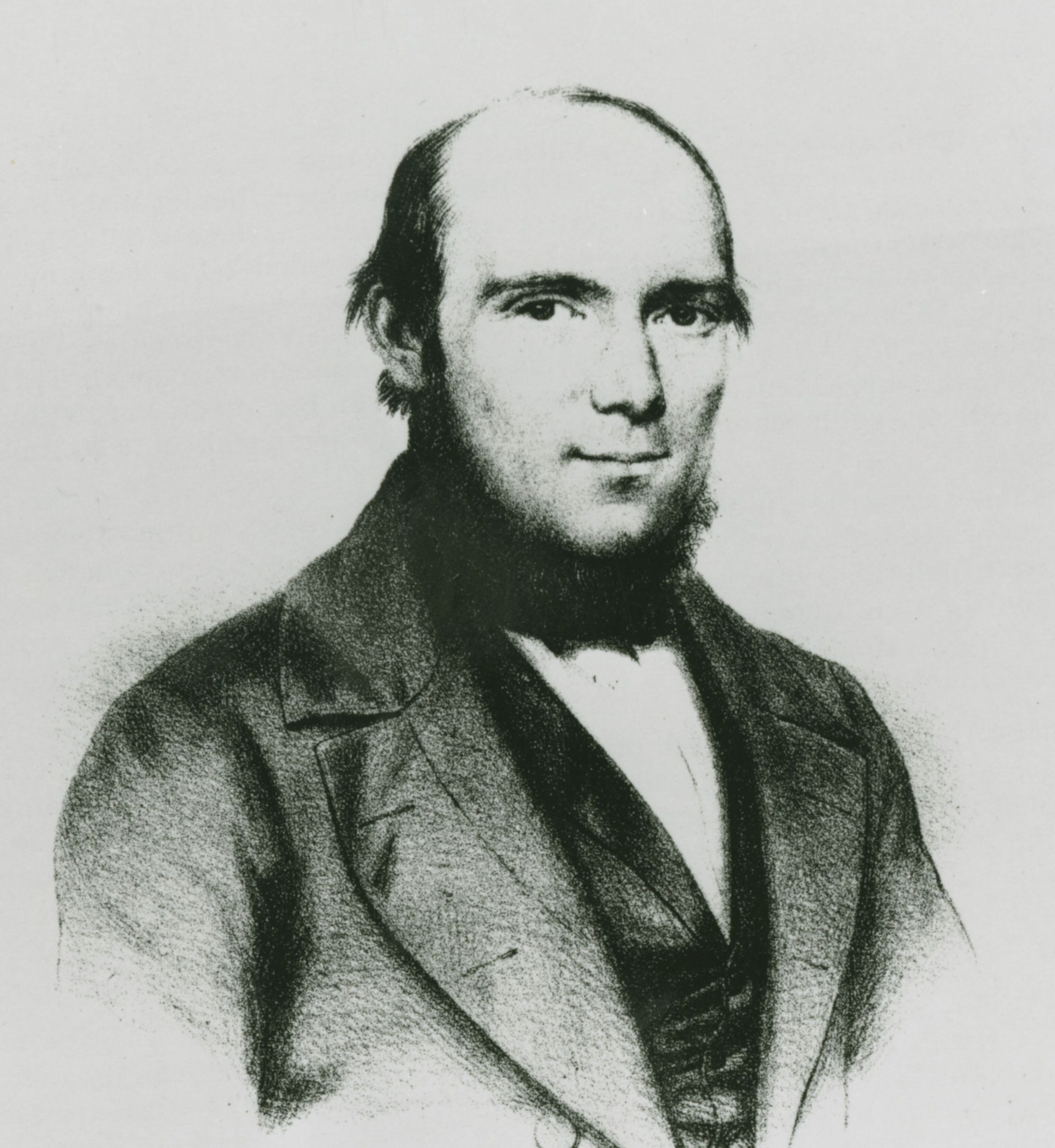
Adolf Anderssen won both the London International Tournament and the rival London Club Tournament.

London 1851 was the first international chess tournament. The tournament was conceived and organised by English player Howard Staunton, and marked the first time that the best chess players in Europe would meet in a single event. Adolf Anderssen of Germany won the sixteen-player tournament, earning him the status of the best player in the world.

== Background and objectives ==
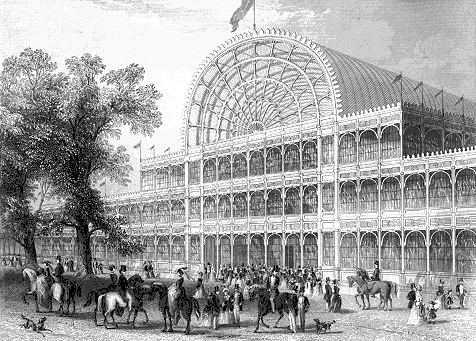
The front entrance of the Great Exhibition

In May 1851, London staged the Great Exhibition to showcase British industry and technology, and London's thriving chess community felt obliged to do something similar for chess. Howard Staunton proposed and then took the lead in organizing the first ever international tournament, to be held at the same time. He thought the Great Exhibition presented a unique opportunity because the difficulties that obstructed international participation would be greatly reduced, for example it would be easier for contestants to obtain passports and leave from work.

In 1848 a letter had been published in which Ludwig Bledow proposed that he and von der Lasa should organize in Trier (Germany) an international tournament whose winner should be recognized as the world champion (Bledow died in 1846; it is not known why publication was delayed). News of this may also have motivated Staunton to organize the London International tournament.

Staunton and his colleagues had ambitious objectives for this tournament, including convening a "Chess Parliament" to: complete the standardization of the moves and other rules, as there were still very small national differences and a few self-contradictions; to standardize chess notation; to agree time limits, as many players were notorious for simply "out-sitting" opponents. Staunton also proposed the production of a compendium showing what was known about chess openings, preferably as a table. Since he thought there would not be time for a single "Chess Parliament" session to handle this as well, he suggested further congresses, some perhaps including knowledgeable enthusiasts of below top-class playing strength, and a review process for dealing with contentious issues and possible mistakes in earlier decisions.

Before the tournament started two commentators wrote that the winner should be regarded as "the World's Chess Champion"; one was Captain Hugh Alexander Kennedy, one of the tournament's organizers and competitors, while the other was the Liberty Weekly Tribune in Missouri. However, there is no indication that crowning a world champion was a formal objective of the tournament.

== Preparation ==
The Committee of Management was under the leadership of the Duke of Marlborough, but Staunton was its Secretary and most of its members were from Staunton's chess club, St George's. Rivalries in British chess at that time led the powerful London Chess Club to boycott the competition, and George Walker used his column in Bell's Life to try to disrupt the tournament preparations. Despite these obstacles, Staunton raised £500 for the prize fund, a considerable sum in 1851, and worth about £359,000 in 2006's money. Subscriptions were obtained from chess clubs in England and overseas. From France, collections were made at the Café de la Régence, and from India, the Calcutta Chess Club contributed £100, and in addition its principal officers John Cochrane and T.C. Morton made two of the four largest personal contributions. The tournament was scheduled to coincide with The Great Exhibition in London, and began on 26 May 1851.

== Players ==
The tournament was planned as a knock-out contest involving sixteen of Europe's best players. Invitations had been extended to foreign masters Vincent Grimm, József Szén, and Johann Löwenthal from Hungary; Adolf Anderssen, Bernhard Horwitz, Carl Mayet, and von der Lasa from Germany; Pierre Charles Fournier de Saint-Amant and Lionel Kieseritzky from France, and Carl Jaenisch, Alexander Petrov and Ilya Shumov from Russia. The British players were to be Howard Staunton, Henry Thomas Buckle, Marmaduke Wyvill, Elijah Williams, Captain Hugh Alexander Kennedy, Samuel Newham, and Henry Bird.

Unfortunately many of the invitees were unable to play. Grimm was unable to attend as he was exiled in Aleppo after his participation in the Hungarian Revolution of 1848. Löwenthal had also participated in the failed revolt but fled to America, where he established himself in business. Löwenthal left his affairs behind to travel to London to play. Saint-Amant was unavailable as he had been sent by the French government to California as a diplomat following its independence from Mexico during the California Gold Rush. Von der Lasa and Petrov were also unable to attend. Jaenisch and Shumov could not arrive in time to play. Jaenisch arrived in London late, and played a post-tournament match with Staunton that Staunton won +7−2=1. Buckle also did not make the tournament, and as he was generally considered second only to Staunton among British players, he was the strongest British player missing. The dispute with the London Chess Club prevented Daniel Harrwitz from playing, and also weakened the pool of substitutes available, as George Walker, George Perigal, and George Webb Medley could have made for a stronger field if not for the boycott. Anderssen was reluctant to accept his invitation, as he was deterred by the travel costs. However Staunton offered to pay Anderssen's travel expenses out of his own pocket if necessary, should Anderssen fail to win a tournament prize; Anderssen accepted this generous offer.

As part of the project the London International Tournament's committee also organized a "London Provincial Tournament" for British players who were not strong enough to be invited to play in the International Tournament. The committee "promoted" Edward Shirley Kennedy, Edward Löwe, James R. Mucklow, and Alfred Brodie to play in the International Tournament rather than the Provincial Tournament, in order to obtain the number of players required for a knock-out tournament.

== Tournament ==
The tournament was organised as single-elimination matches, with the eight losers in the first round being dropped from the tournament. Each first-round match was a best-of-three games, draws not counting. Subsequent rounds were best-of-seven, and losers played consolation matches. The pairings were made by chance, i.e. there was no seeding system of the type commonly used in tennis tournaments. Three of the stronger players, Kieseritzky, Bird, and Löwenthal all lost in the first round. On the other hand, two of the replacement players, J. R. Mucklow and E. S. Kennedy, were drawn against each other; the winner (Mucklow) thus gained a share of the prize money. Anderssen beat Staunton soundly, 4–1 in the third-round semi-final. In the fourth-round final Anderssen beat Wyvill to take first place. Wyvill had had a relatively easy draw in the tournament to finish second. Staunton suffered a bitter defeat to Williams in the last round consolation match to finish a disappointing fourth.

== Aftermath ==
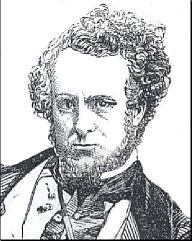
Howard Staunton

Though some later commentators considered the knockout format to be flawed, Anderssen was considered a deserving winner. As provided by the rules of the tournament, Staunton immediately challenged Anderssen to a twenty-one-game match for a £100 stake. Anderssen agreed to the match, but could not play right away as he had been away from Germany and his job as a school teacher for over two months. In addition Staunton was physically unfit for an immediate contest. The proposed match was never played.

As a result of winning this tournament Anderssen was popularly recognised as Europe's best player, although as far as is known he was never described as "world champion". The idea of a world chess champion had been current at least since 1840, and the earliest known use of the term "world champion" is in 1845, referring to Staunton and published in Staunton's Chess Players' Chronicle. Wilhelm Steinitz was widely recognized as "world champion" in the 1870s, but the first formal contest for the world title was the 1886 match between Steinitz and Johannes Zukertort.

Staunton wrote the tournament book, which he titled The Chess Tournament (1852). Although an excellent description of the event, it was marred by ill grace with which he received Anderssen's victory. Staunton's description of Anderssen as Germany's second-best player after Anderssen won the 1851 International tournament may have been reasonable, however, on the basis of what is now known about von der Lasa's skill, and Anderssen's playing strength had surged in the months preceding the tournament, as a result of training matches against strong players in Germany.

Staunton blamed his poor showing on the strain of his duties in organising the tournament, and also thought that he suffered from a weak heart since an illness in 1844. He condemned the pursuit of chess as a profession, writing

Chess never was, and while society exists, never can be a profession. It may to a great extent strengthen the mind of the professional man, but it must never become the object of his life. It is because its true character has been lost sight of by the zealous or the mercenary, that victory at any cost has become a more important object than the advancement of the science.

At least in part, this was the complaint of an ungracious loser, as most of Staunton's income was derived from his skill at chess. By this time Staunton was also a successful scholar with a long-term contract to produce editions of Shakespeare's plays.

Staunton was also concerned with the lack of time limits on play. After some experimentation, time controls would become standard in all serious tournaments some years later. The weakness of the knockout format, a kind of hybrid between match and tournament play, was eliminated by adopting the round-robin format beginning with the London 1862 tournament.

The famous Immortal Game, Anderssen–Kieseritzky, London 1851, was played as an offhand game during a break in this tournament. It was not one of the games of their first-round match.

The London Chess Club, which had fallen out with Staunton and his colleagues, organized a tournament that was played a month later and had a multi-national set of players (many of whom had competed in the International tournament), and the result was the same – Anderssen won.

== Strength of the competition ==
Staunton is generally regarded as having been the leading world player from 1843 until this tournament, due to his 1843 match victory against Pierre Charles Fournier de Saint-Amant.

As this was the first ever international tournament, it is difficult to assess the strengths of the players in earlier events. According to Chessmetrics, five of the top eight players in the world were present: Kieseritzky (1), Williams (3), Löwenthal (4), Anderssen (6) and Mayet (8); and the highest ranked player not present was Tassilo von Heydebrand und der Lasa, who had won a match against Anderssen earlier in 1851.

During the tournament, Anderssen won matches against both Kieseritzky and Staunton.

== Scores ==
Draws did not count. Matches with a drawn game are indicated by asterisks. No match had more than one draw.

The results are as follows.

=== Knock-out tournament ===
First Round
(Kingdom of Prussia) Adolf Anderssen	2*
(France) Lionel Kieseritzky	0*
(Austrian Empire) József Szén	2
(United Kingdom) Samuel Newham	0
(German Confederation) Bernhard Horwitz	2*
(United Kingdom) Henry Edward Bird	1*
(United Kingdom) Howard Staunton	2
(United Kingdom) Alfred Brodie	0
(United Kingdom) Elijah Williams	2
(Austrian Empire) Johann Löwenthal	1
(United Kingdom) James R. Mucklow	2
(United Kingdom) Edward Shirley Kennedy	0
(United Kingdom) Hugh A. Kennedy	2
(Kingdom of Prussia) Carl Mayet	0
(United Kingdom) Marmaduke Wyvill	2
(United Kingdom) Edward Löwe	0

Second Round
(Kingdom of Prussia) Adolf Anderssen	4
(Austrian Empire) József Szén	2
(United Kingdom) Howard Staunton	4*
(German Confederation) Bernhard Horwitz	2*
(United Kingdom) Elijah Williams	4
(United Kingdom) James R. Mucklow	0
(United Kingdom) Marmaduke Wyvill	4*
(United Kingdom) Hugh A. Kennedy	3*

Semi-final
(Kingdom of Prussia) Adolf Anderssen	4
(United Kingdom) Howard Staunton	1
(United Kingdom) Marmaduke Wyvill	4
(United Kingdom) Elijah Williams	3

Final
(Kingdom of Prussia) Adolf Anderssen	4*
(United Kingdom) Marmaduke Wyvill	2*

=== Playoffs for minor places ===
- Williams 4 – Staunton 3 (1 draw) (Match for 3rd and 4th place)
- Szén 4 – Capt. Kennedy 0 (1 draw) (Match for 5th and 6th place)
- Horwitz won as Mucklow defaulted (Match for 7th and 8th place)
