= John Cochrane (chess player) =

Scottish lawyer and chess player (1798–1878)

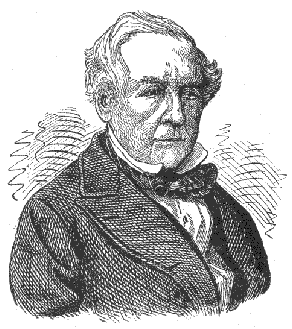
John Cochrane

John Cochrane (4 February 1798 – 2 March 1878) was a Scottish chess master and lawyer. After serving in the Royal Navy Cochrane chose to become a barrister. While studying law, he became a very strong chess player and published a book on the game, which included the Cochrane variation of the Salvio Gambit, a main line of the King's Gambit. Around this time he played against the Frenchmen Deschapelles and Labourdonnais, who were acknowledged to be Europe's strongest players at the time.

After a long tour of duty in India, he returned to the UK and beat everyone except Howard Staunton, whom he then helped to prepare for his victorious match against the Frenchman Saint-Amant, which established Staunton as the world's leading player. Cochrane returned to India, where he became known as the "Father of the Calcutta Bar" (association of barristers) and a leading member of the Calcutta Chess Club; the Club and Cochrane personally both made significant financial contributions to the first international chess tournament, which Staunton organised. Cochrane continued to play chess and to send games to the UK for publication, mostly in Staunton's columns. His two main opponents were Indians, and against one of them he made the first recorded use of the Cochrane Gambit against Petrov's Defence. When he returned to the UK for good, Cochrane continued to practise law part-time, mainly in important cases that arose in India, and wrote articles and books about the law. By this time he was too old for serious chess competition but played many casual games with strong players.

Cochrane is credited with discovering the Cochrane Defense, a technique to draw the difficult endgame defence of a rook against a rook and bishop. Cochrane is known for his dashing playing style – liberally sacrificing pieces and always attacking. His best-known opening innovations are generally regarded as dubious, although the Cochrane Gambit is still occasionally used as a surprise weapon in master chess. Commentators during his life and after his death expressed strong affection for him.

== Biography ==
Cochrane was "a member of a distinguished Scottish family of which the Earl of Dundonald was the head". He was probably the son of John Cochrane, an army paymaster and merchant and the son of Thomas Cochrane, 8th Earl of Dundonald. As a youth Cochrane was a midshipman in the Royal Navy, and is said to have served aboard HMS Bellerophon when the ship transported Napoleon Bonaparte to Britain in 1815. The downsizing of the Navy after the end of the Napoleonic Wars made promotion prospects poor, and Cochrane switched to a career as a barrister, apparently joining the Middle Temple without first attending a university.

Position: a8 black rook, b8 black knight, c8 black bishop, e8 black king, f8 black bishop, g8 black knight, h8 black rook, a7 black pawn, b7 black pawn, c7 black pawn, d7 black pawn, f7 black pawn, h7 black pawn, e5 white knight, c4 white bishop, e4 white pawn, g4 black pawn, h4 black queen, f3 black pawn, a2 white pawn, b2 white pawn, c2 white pawn, d2 white pawn, g2 white pawn, h2 white pawn, a1 white rook, b1 white knight, c1 white bishop, d1 white queen, f1 white king, h1 white rook

Cochrane's variation of the Salvio Gambit (King's Gambit). Position after 1.e4 e5 2.f4 exf4 3.Nf3 g5 4.Bc4 g4 5.Ne5 Qh4+ 6.Kf1 f3

While he was a student he first came to notice as a chess player. The first records of John Cochrane as a chess-player are five games (−3 =1 +1) played receiving the pawn and move from The Turk (operated, at the time, by Mouret) in 1819. In 1822, he published A Treatise on the Game of Chess, of which the section on odds was based on the Traité des Amateurs, written by Verdoni, Bernard, Carlier and Leger. However Cochrane's book contained significant amounts of his own analysis, including the Cochrane variation of the Salvio Gambit, a line in the King's Gambit. It is known that Cochrane played against Deschapelles and Labourdonnais, who were acknowledged to be Europe's strongest players from 1800 to 1820 and from 1820 to 1840 respectively; his games against them may have been played between 1822 and 1824, but by the time of Cochrane's death commentators were unsure of the dates.

Soon after qualifying as a barrister, Cochrane decided to make his career in India. Before he left, however, he took a leading part for the London team in the early stages of a correspondence match against an Edinburgh team, which lasted from 1824 to 1828, and which the Edinburgh team won. The best-known game of this match was the second, in which, according to Howard Staunton, the London team obtained a winning position by following Cochrane's plan, but blundered after his departure. In India Cochrane became a successful and respected barrister, and also lost no opportunity to play chess with other expatriates and with Indians.

By the early 1840s Cochrane had accumulated a lot of leave, and he spent 1841 to 1843 in the UK. Naturally he spent a lot of time at the top London chess clubs, where he beat almost everyone – including Pierre de Saint-Amant, who was France's strongest player. However the rising star of British chess was Howard Staunton, who had been a schoolboy when Cochrane published his book. Staunton and Cochrane played at least 120 games on level terms, of which Staunton won about twice as many as Cochrane. Just before Cochrane's return to India, Staunton began to give him the odds of Pawn and move, and in these games their scores were equal. Although Cochrane was annoyed with Staunton for under-representing Cochrane's wins in his chess articles, he helped Staunton to prepare for his second match against Saint-Amant, which Staunton won and therefore was for several years regarded as the world's strongest player.

Position: a8 black rook, b8 black knight, c8 black bishop, d8 black queen, e8 black king, f8 black bishop, h8 black rook, a7 black pawn, b7 black pawn, c7 black pawn, f7 white knight, g7 black pawn, h7 black pawn, d6 black pawn, f6 black knight, e4 white pawn, a2 white pawn, b2 white pawn, c2 white pawn, d2 white pawn, f2 white pawn, g2 white pawn, h2 white pawn, a1 white rook, b1 white knight, c1 white bishop, d1 white queen, e1 white king, f1 white bishop, h1 white rook

Cochrane Gambit
Position after 1.e4 e5 2.Nf3 Nf6 3.Nxe5 d6 4.Nxf7

Even after Cochrane returned to India, later in 1843, Staunton's articles and books continued to publish Cochrane's games, and contain most of the games by Cochrane that are still known about, whether played in England or India. It was Staunton who made British chess aware of how strong Cochrane was at his peak, and described him as "Father of the English Chess School". During the second part of Cochrane's career in India his main opponents were the Indian players Moheschunder Bannerjee and Saumchurn Guttack also known as Somacarana or Shyamacharan Ghatak. Cochrane's first recorded use of the Cochrane Gambit against Petrov's Defence was in a game against Bannerjee in 1848. Bannerjee's fondness for fianchettoed openings, as reported by Cochrane, eventually led to the Indian defence class of openings. Another game, published in William Norwood Potter's City of London Chess Magazine shows Bannerjee playing with the black pieces and beating Cochrane in a game that opened with the King's Indian Four Pawns Attack. When Staunton organised the world's first international chess tournament, the Calcutta Chess Club as a group made one of the largest donations to the tournament's funds, and in addition its principal officers Cochrane and T.C. Morton made two of the largest personal contributions. During his second period in India Cochrane became known as the Father of the Calcutta Bar (local association of barristers). Staunton also published an incident in which Cochrane gave the whole of his fee for a case to a group of famine-stricken Indians

When Cochrane returned to the UK for good, he continued to work part-time as a barrister, arguing several Indian appeals before the UK's Privy Council and writing legal treatises. His most important law book, the "Defence of the Daya Bhaga" (1872), was written in support of the native law of inheritance in Bengal. At the time of his death he was working on another law book. His enthusiasm for chess remained equally strong, although he restricted himself to casual games that typically lasted about 15 minutes – many of them with the veteran master Johann Löwenthal (1810–1876). He was a keen spectator at more serious contests and, as he was going deaf by this time, his comments on the play were often loud enough to be heard by players and amuse bystanders. He became known for his entertaining but always amiable conversation, and for the encouragement he gave to young players.

Cochrane was one of the earliest notable British chess masters, his playing career beginning during those of Jacob Henry Sarratt (1772–1819) and William Lewis (1787–1870). He played against Labourdonnais before anyone had heard of the Frenchman's great opponent Alexander McDonnell, and was a successful writer about the game in 1822, when Howard Staunton was a schoolboy. In 1844 George Walker described Cochrane's approach to the game:"Mr. Cochrane is the most brilliant player I have ever had the honour to look over or confront; not even excepting De la Bourdonnais; and pity it is that his very brilliancy so often mars success." Cochrane was also a well-known chess theoretician, although his innovations in the openings were generally unsound, and only he could get away with playing them. However the Cochrane Gambit still appears occasionally as a surprise weapon in serious competition, for example Veselin Topalov drew with it against Vladimir Kramnik at Linares in 1999. The Cochrane Defense is the method most often chosen by top-class players to draw in the endgame with a rook versus a rook and bishop.

== See also ==
- Cochrane Defense
