= Elias Stein (chess player) =

Dutch chess player

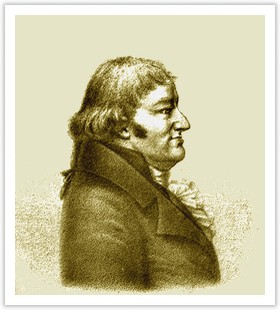
Elias Stein

Elias Stein (5 February 1748, in Forbach – 12 September 1812, in The Hague) was a Dutch chess master. Born in Lorraine into a Jewish family, he settled in The Hague.

Stein was also employed as chess teacher of the sons of William V, Prince of Orange, and thereby introduced chess to the Dutch high society.

He recommended what is now known as the Dutch Defence (1...f5) as the best reply to 1.d4 in his book Nouvel essai sur le jeu des échecs, avec des réflexions militaires relatives à ce jeu (1789). His biography was written by lieutenant-colonel F.W. von Mauvillon in the book Anweisung zur Erlernung des Schachspiels (Essen, Germany, 1827).

== Works ==
- E. Stein: Handleiding tot het schaakspel. (2e herz. en verb. druk) Amsterdam, Van Kesteren, 1851.
- E. Stein: Nieuwe proeve van handleiding tot het schaakspel. (Vert. door Daniël Broedelet). Purmerende, Broedelet & Rijkenberg, 1834. (Div. herdr., o.a. 's-Gravenhage 1843 & Leyden 1850)
- Elias Stein: Nouvel essai sur le jeu des échecs, avec des reflexions militaires relatives a ce jeu. La Haye, aux depens de l'auteur, 1789. (Herdr. o.a. Paris, De La Rue, 1841 & 1850)
