= Bernhard Horwitz =

German-British chess player (1807–1885)

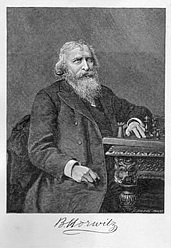

Bernhard Horwitz (1807 – 1885) was a German and British chess master, chess writer and chess composer.

== Biography ==
Horwitz was born in Neustrelitz and went to school in Berlin, where he studied art. From 1837 to 1843, he was part of a group of German chess players known as the Berlin Pleiades.

He moved to London in 1845, where he became a British citizen. In 1846, he lost a match against visiting master Lionel Kieseritzky, and another against Howard Staunton, losing 15½–8½. His best chess result was winning a match against Henry Bird in 1851. He played in the first international chess tournament, London 1851, again beating Bird in the first round, but losing to Staunton in the second and József Szén in the third.

Horwitz died in London in 1885 and was buried on the eastern side of Highgate Cemetery.

== Legacy ==
Position: d8 white rook, f7 black king, d6 white king, d5 white pawn, d1 black rook

The Kling and Horwitz Defensive Technique enables Black to force a draw with Black to move.

Horwitz's Chess Studies (1851), co-authored with Josef Kling, is an important work on the endgame study and endgames in general.

"Horwitz bishops", a configuration in which two bishops are aggressively placed on adjacent diagonals, are named after Horwitz.

The Kling and Horwitz Defensive Technique enables Black to force a draw with Black to move against perfect play in the diagram shown. For a detailed analysis of this position, see here.

== See also ==
- List of Jewish chess players
