= William Davies Evans =

Welsh navy captain, inventor and chess player

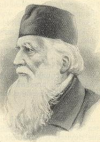
William Evans

Captain William Davies Evans (27 January 1790 – 3 August 1872) was a Welsh seafarer and inventor who was the first chess player to play the Evans Gambit, a chess opening.

== Biography ==
=== Early life ===
Evans was born at St Dogwells, Pembrokeshire, Wales. He almost certainly went to Haverfordwest Grammar School, the only school in Pembrokeshire at that time. About the beginning of the century the family moved to Castle Pill, an inlet on the north side of Milford Haven, just east of Milford town.

=== Early career ===
Evans served at sea in the navy from 1804, when he was 14, until the Napoleonic Wars ended in 1815.

He was then transferred to the postal department. By 1819, he had reached the title of Captain of the sailing packet.

=== Inventions ===
Evans invented tri-coloured lighting on naval vessels to prevent collisions at night. For this invention, the British government awarded him £1500 and a gold chronometer, while the Tsar of Russia gave him £200.

=== Chess player ===
Evans Gambit
Position: a8 black rook, c8 black bishop, d8 black queen, e8 black king, g8 black knight, h8 black rook, a7 black pawn, b7 black pawn, c7 black pawn, d7 black pawn, f7 black pawn, g7 black pawn, h7 black pawn, c6 black knight, c5 black bishop, e5 black pawn, b4 white pawn, c4 white bishop, e4 white pawn, f3 white knight, a2 white pawn, c2 white pawn, d2 white pawn, f2 white pawn, g2 white pawn, h2 white pawn, a1 white rook, b1 white knight, c1 white bishop, d1 white queen, e1 white king, h1 white rook
- Moves: 1.e4 e5 2.Nf3 Nc6 3.Bc4 Bc5 4.b4
- ECO: C51–C52

By 1818, he had learned the moves of chess.

Around 1825–1826, on shore leave in London, Evans played Alexander McDonnell, beating the latter with what is now regarded in chess circles as the first Evans Gambit (1.e4 e5 2.Nf3 Nc6 3.Bc4 Bc5 4.b4). According to GM Andrew Soltis, Evans was "the first player to be widely honored for an opening we know he played".

=== Death ===
He is buried at the Belgian port of Ostend.

== Gallery ==
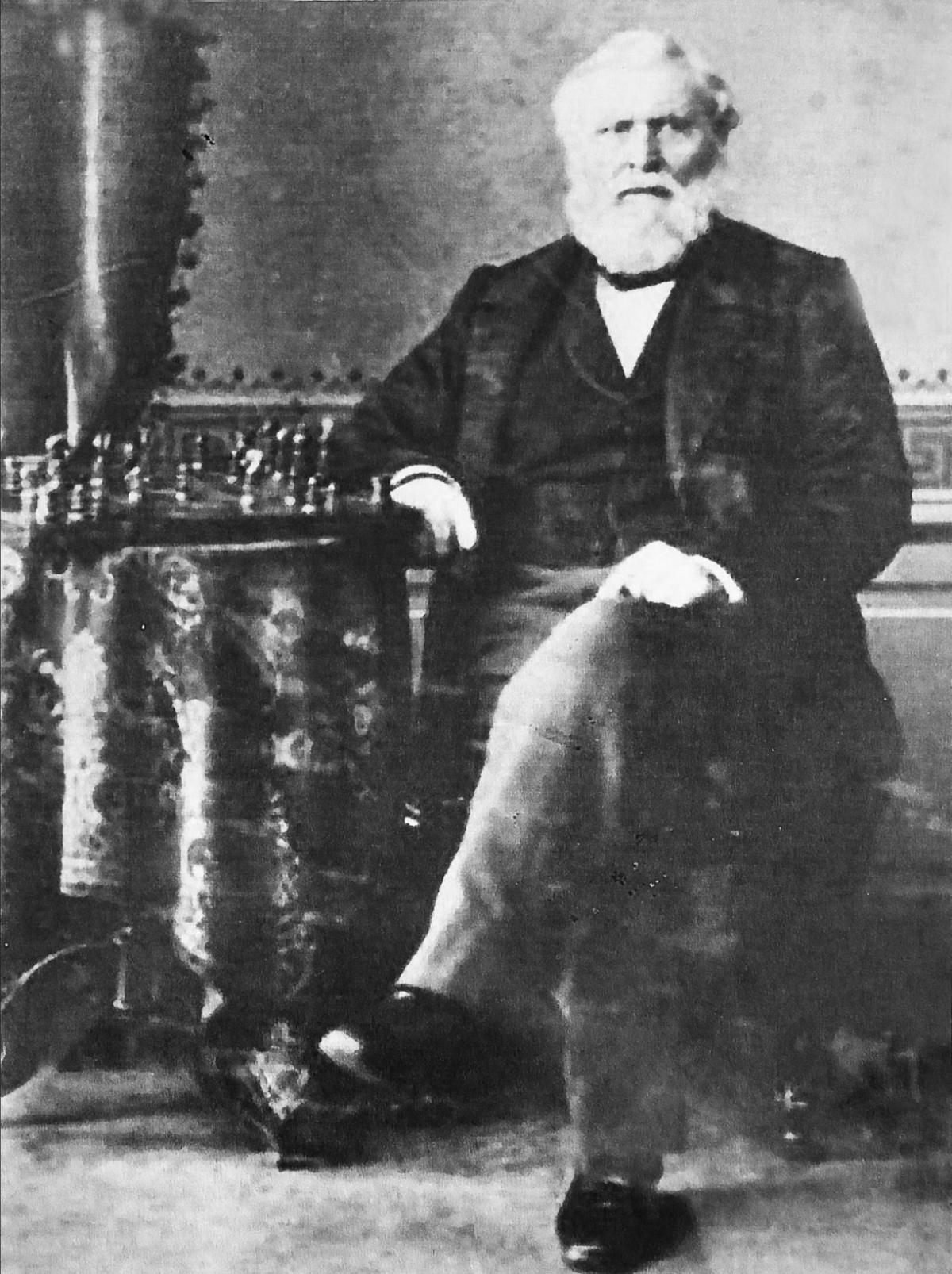
Captain Evans, circa 1850s
