= Elijah Williams (chess player) =

British chess player (1809–1854)

Elijah Williams (7 October 1809 – 8 September 1854) was a British chess player of the mid-19th century. He was the first president of the Clifton Chess Club, and publisher of a book of games from the Divan Club. His most notable result was at the 1851 London tournament, in which he defeated the celebrated British player Howard Staunton in the play-off for third place.

He was accused by Staunton of taking an average of 2½ hours per move during some matches, a strategy thought to cause opponents to lose their focus on the match. According to Staunton, following a particularly dilatory performance by Williams in the London 1851 tournament, a 20-minute per turn time limit was adopted for standard play the next year. However other sources contradict this viewpoint and indeed it was not uncommon for Staunton to attribute his losses to the intolerable dilatory play of his opponents. Staunton is quoted as remarking while playing against Williams, "... Elijah, you're not just supposed to sit there – you're supposed to sit there and think!"

In The Complete Chess Addict by Mike Fox and Richard James, he was dubbed "the Bristol Sloth" due to his alleged extreme slowness. This sobriquet inspired a musical tune "The Bristol Sloth" by guitarist Leo Kottke (who also applied the term 'sitzkrieg' in describing Williams' playing style).

Williams died in London, a victim of the 1854 Broad Street cholera outbreak.
