= József Szén =

Hungarian chess player

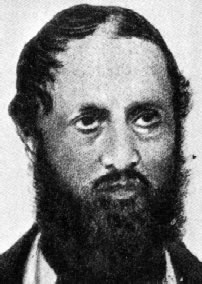
József Szén

József Szén (9 July 1805, Pest, Hungary – 13 January 1857) was a Hungarian chess master who lived in the Austrian Empire.

He obtained a law degree, and later became a civil servant for the city of Pest, which later merged with the city of Buda (on the opposite bank of the Danube River) in 1873 to form present-day Budapest. He often played in the Café Worm of Pest, playing with any opponent for a stake of 20 Kreuzers.

Very strong in the endgame, he was given the nickname of the Hungarian Philidor. He discovered and described the Szen position, in the endgame of rook and bishop against rook, as a drawing method for the weaker side (see below). This work has stood up to subsequent analysis.

From 1836 to 1839, Szen travelled extensively throughout much of Europe, including France, Germany and England, playing chess wherever he went. In 1836 Szén played a match in Paris with Louis-Charles Mahé de La Bourdonnais, then considered the strongest player in the world, in which de La Bourdonnais gave him odds of pawn and two moves. Szén won with 13 wins and 12 losses, and no draws. Also in 1836, Szen drew a match with Parisian Hyacinthe Henri Boncourt, one of France's strongest players.

In 1839, Szén founded the Budapest Chess Club (Pesti Sakk-kör). In the same year, he lost a match to Karl Mayet (+2 –3 =1) in Berlin. Between 1842 and 1846, he headed a Pest (Budapest) team of correspondence players, including Johann Lowenthal, that beat a Paris team, headed by Pierre Saint-Amant, with two wins and no losses. The Hungarian team introduced the Hungarian Defense (1. e4 e5 2. Nf3 Nc6 3. Bc4 Be7), which is playable but rarely seen in modern top-level play.

In 1851, he lost a match by 13-7 to Lionel Kieseritzky.

Szén took fifth place at the world's first international chess tournament, London 1851. In the first round he beat Samuel Newham 2-0, then lost 2-4 to the tournament winner, Adolf Anderssen; in the third round he overcame Bernhard Horwitz 4-0, and in the fourth round Hugh Alexander Kennedy by 4½-½. He actually scored the highest percentage in the tournament. In 1852, he drew a match with Ernst Falkbeer (+9 –9 =2) in Vienna. In 1853, he lost a match to Daniel Harrwitz (+1 –3 =1) in London.

== Playing strength ==
Szen was certainly within or near the world's top ten players for most of his playing career, and his result at London 1851 placed him on the edge of the top five. There were no international titles or ratings for chess in his era. Formal titles began only in 1950, and international ratings in 1970. In Szen's era, international tournament competition was very rare, with long-distance travel being both cumbersome and expensive. The website Chessmetrics.com assigns retrospective historical ratings, using modern mathematical algorithms, based on available results. His peak rating of 2546 is for mid-1851, fourth in the world. However, Chessmetrics is missing many of Szen's important results. In a modern context, this rating would be at the level of a strong International Master.

== See also ==
- Szén position - a defensive position in the rook and bishop versus rook endgame
