= Henry Thomas Buckle =

English historian (1821–1862)

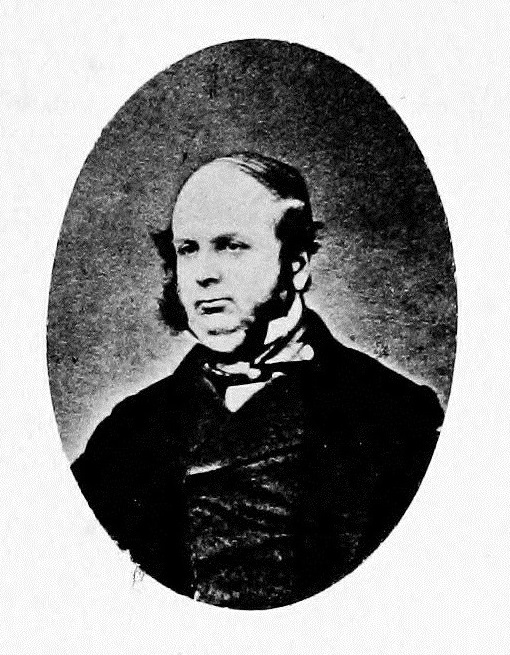
- Henry Thomas Buckle
- Born: 24 November 1821; Lee, London, England
- Died: 29 May 1862 (aged 40); Damascus, Ottoman Syria
- Occupations: Historian, chess player
- Known for: History of Civilisation in England

Henry Thomas Buckle (24 November 1821 – 29 May 1862) was an English historian, the author of an unfinished History of Civilization and a strong amateur chess player. He is sometimes called "the Father of Scientific History".

== Early life ==
Buckle, the son of Thomas Henry Buckle (1779–1840), a wealthy London merchant and shipowner, and his wife, Jane Middleton (d. 1859) of Yorkshire, was born at Lee, London (Kent County) on 24 November 1821. He had two sisters. His father died in January 1840.

As a boy, Buckle's "delicate health" rendered him unsuited for the usual formal education or games of middle-class youth. However, he loved reading. That made him suitable to be "educated at home by his mother, to whom he was devoted until her death in 1859. She taught him to read the Bible, the Arabian Nights, The Pilgrim's Progress, and Shakespeare. His father read theology and literature and occasionally recited Shakespeare to the family in the evenings."

Buckle's one year of formal education was in Gordon House School at age fourteen. When his father offered him a reward for winning a prize in mathematics, Buckle asked "to be taken away from school". From then on he was self-taught. As such, Buckle said later, "I was never much tormented with what is called education, but allowed to pursue my own way undisturbed.... Whatever I may now be supposed to know I taught myself".

Although love for his mother dominated his life, there were other instances of his love for women. At 17, he fell in love with a cousin and "challenged a man to whom she was engaged". He fell for another cousin, but his parents objected.

At 19, Buckle first gained distinction as a chess player. He was known as one of the best in the world. In matchplay, he defeated Lionel Kieseritzky and Johann Löwenthal.

Buckle's father died in 1840. Buckle inherited £20,000. This inheritance allowed Buckle to live the rest of his life in reading, writing, and travel. In July 1840, Buckle, his mother, and his sister Mary spent almost a year in Europe, with "extended stays in Germany, Italy, and France. Buckle studied the language, literature, and history of each place they visited". Buckle taught himself to read 18 foreign languages.

== History of Civilization in England ==
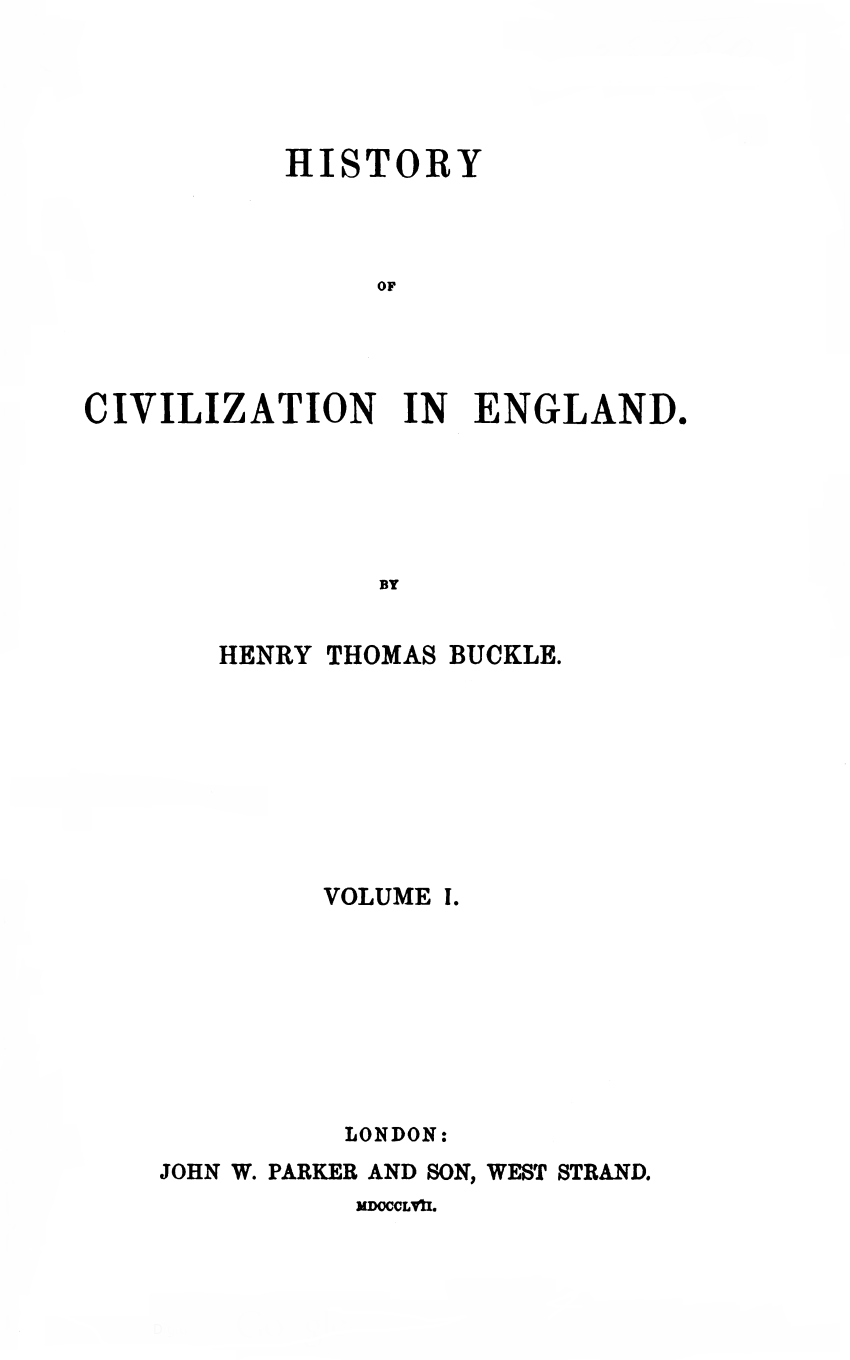
Title page of the first edition of History of Civilization in England

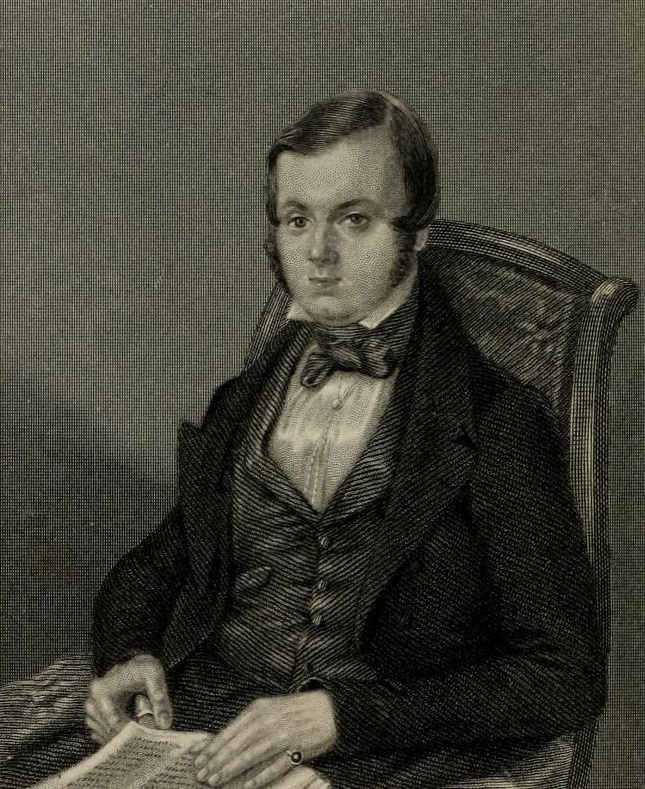
Buckle, age 24

The description of History of Civilization in England is taken from the Encyclopædia Britannica Eleventh Edition (1911):

By 1840, Buckle had decided "to direct all his reading and to devote all his energies to the preparation of some great historical work". During the next seventeen years he worked ten hours a day toward that purpose. By 1851, Buckle had decided that his "great historical work" would be "a history of civilization". During the next six years, he was engaged "in writing and rewriting, altering and revising the first volume". It was titled the History of Civilization in England and was published in June 1857.

Buckle's fame rests mainly on his History of Civilization in England. It is a gigantic unfinished introduction of which the plan was firstly to state the general principles of the author's method and the general laws that govern the course of human progress and secondly to exemplify these principles and laws through the histories of certain nations characterized by prominent and peculiar features: Spain, Scotland, the United States and Germany. The completed work was to have extended to 14 volumes; its chief ideas are:

1. That, owing partly to the want of ability in historians, and partly to the complexity of social phenomena, extremely little had as yet been done towards discovering the principles that govern the character and destiny of nations, or, in other words, towards establishing a science of history;
2. That, while the theological dogma of predestination is a barren hypothesis beyond the province of knowledge, and the metaphysical dogma of free will rests on an erroneous belief in the infallibility of consciousness, it is proved by science, and especially by statistics, that human actions are governed by laws as fixed and regular as those that rule in the physical world;
3. That climate, soil, food, and the aspects of nature are the primary causes of intellectual progress: the first three indirectly, through determining the accumulation and distribution of wealth, and the last by directly influencing the accumulation and distribution of thought, the imagination being stimulated and the understanding subdued when the phenomena of the external world are sublime and terrible, the understanding being emboldened and the imagination curbed when they are small and feeble;
4. That the great division between European and non-European civilization turns on the fact that in Europe man is stronger than nature, and that elsewhere nature is stronger than man, the consequence of which is that in Europe alone has man subdued nature to his service;
5. That the advance of European civilization is characterized by a continually diminishing influence of physical laws, and a continually increasing influence of mental laws;
6. That the mental laws that regulate the progress of society cannot be discovered by the metaphysical method, that is, by the introspective study of the individual mind, but only by such a comprehensive survey of facts as enable us to eliminate disturbances, that is, by the method of averages;
7. That human progress has been due, not to moral agencies, which are stationary, and which balance one another in such a manner that their influence is unfelt over any long period, but to intellectual activity, which has been constantly varying and advancing: "The actions of individuals are greatly affected by their moral feelings and passions; but these being antagonistic to the passions and feelings of other individuals, are balanced by them, so that their effect is, in the great average of human affairs, nowhere to be seen, and the total actions of mankind, considered as a whole, are left to be regulated by the total knowledge of which mankind is possessed";
8. That individual efforts are insignificant in the great mass of human affairs, and that great men, although they exist, and must "at present" be looked upon as disturbing forces, are merely the creatures of the age to which they belong;
9. That religion, literature and government are, at the best, the products and not the causes of civilization;
10. That the progress of civilization varies directly as "scepticism", the disposition to doubt and to investigate, and inversely as "credulity" or "the protective spirit", a disposition to maintain, without examination, established beliefs and practices.

== Personal life ==
Because he was uneasy about his health, Buckle "rose, worked, walked, dined, and retired with remarkable regularity". His inheritance "enabled him to live comfortably", but he spent money prudently with two exceptions: fine cigars and his collection of 22,000 books. Buckle and his mother enjoyed giving dinners for friends and dining out. Buckle was mostly deemed to be "a good conversationalist" because of his "deep knowledge of a wide range of subjects". On the other hand, some thought him "tedious or egotistical" with a tendency "to dominate conversations". He won the first British chess tournament in 1849.

According to the autobiography of Scottish nobleman Charles Stewart, Buckle cliamed: "Men and women range themselves into three classes or orders of intelligence; you can tell the lowest class by their habit of always talking about persons; the next by the fact that their habit is always to converse about things; the highest, by their preference for the discussion of ideas".

The monographic publisher John Camden Hotten claimed that his series of flagellation reprints The Library Illustrative of Social Progress had been taken from Buckle's collection, but that was untrue, as reported by Henry Spencer Ashbee.

=== Later life and death ===
On 1 April 1859, Buckle's mother died. Shortly afterward, under the influence of this "crushing and desolating affliction", he added an argument for immortality to a review he was writing of John Stuart Mill's essay On Liberty. Buckle's argument was not based on theologians "with their books, their dogmas, their traditions, their rituals, their records, and their other perishable contrivances". Rather he based his argument on "the universality of the affections; the yearning of every mind to care for something out of itself". Buckle asserted that "it is in the need of loving and of being loved, that the highest instincts of our nature are first revealed."

As if reflecting on his mother's death, Buckle continued that "as long as we are with those whom we love..., we rejoice". But when "the enemy [death]" approaches, "when the very signs of life are mute ... and there lies before us nought save the shell and husk of what we loved too well, then truly, if we believed the separation were final ... the best of us would succumb, but for the deep conviction that all is not really over." We have "a forecast of another and a higher state". Thus, Buckle concluded, "it is, then, to that sense of immortality with which the affections inspire us, that I would appeal for the best proof of the reality of a future life". He also wrote, "If immortality be untrue it matters little if anything else be true or not."

The death of his mother in 1859 combined with the exhausting work on the second volume of the History of Civilization in England, and its publication in 1861 invoked a decision by Buckle to go to Egypt to recover from exhaustion, inviting "one Elizabeth Faunch, the widow of a carpenter", to join him. Mrs. Faunch refused his invitation, but there is some evidence that the two had been engaged in a liaison for some time".

He toured Egypt. Then, feeling better, Buckle traveled to Palestine and Syria. He died of typhoid fever in Damascus, Syria, on 29 May 1862 and was buried there. A sister provided a gravestone with the epitaph "I know that he shall rise again". The sister of the British consul in Damascus added, "The written word remains long after the writer; The writer is resting under the earth, but his works endure".

== Assessment ==
=== Contemporary ===
The North American Review characterized Buckle as a "self-styled historian of civilization". He "ransacks all history, history, literature, and science for proofs and illustrations of his preconceived opinion". Furthermore, "the absurdity of the conclusions to which he is led furnishes, perhaps, the best proof of the erroneousness of his method and the falsity of his premises". In conclusion, "under the guise of a history, [the book's] only aim is to teach the preconceived conclusions of a false and debasing philosophy".

There was a review of Buckle's History of Civilization in England. Vol II in The New York Times. The review concluded, "notwithstanding these imperfections, we still regard the History of Civilization as perhaps the most important contribution to modern historical science.... It is easy for one to make a great many very superficial objections to Mr. Buckle's mode of treating history..., but the more one comes up with the grandeur of his method, the less disposition there will be to make such objections.... His influence on the thought of the present age cannot but be enormous; and if he gives us no more than we already have in the two volumes of the magnum opus, he will still be classed among the fathers and founders of the Science of History".

A review of Buckle's newly published Essays appeared in the direct predecessor of the Portland Press Herald on Saturday, 27 December 1862. The editors wrote of Buckle: "a solitary unremitting student, with no encouragement save from the home circle, and no opportunity of measuring himself with rivals, he naturally, with all his wealth of learning, command of language, and vigor of thinking, fell into those pitfalls of rashness and inaccuracy which lie in wait for the recluse".

=== Posthumous ===
The paranoid narrator of Fyodor Dostoevsky's Notes From Underground discusses Buckle's theories: "Why, to maintain this theory of the regeneration of mankind by means of the pursuit of his own is to my mind almost the same thing... as to affirm, for instance, following Buckle, that through civilisation mankind becomes softer, and consequently less bloodthirsty and less fitted for warfare. Logically it does seem to follow from his arguments. But man has such a predilection for systems and abstract deductions that he is ready to distort the truth intentionally, he is ready to deny the evidence of his senses only to justify his logic. I take this example because it is the most glaring instance of it. Only look about you: blood is being spilt in streams, and in the merriest way, as though it were champagne. Take the whole of the nineteenth century in which Buckle lived. Take Napoleon—the Great and also the present one. Take North America—the eternal union [an ironic reference to the ongoing American Civil War]. Take the farce of Schleswig-Holstein.... And what is it that civilisation softens in us? The only gain of civilisation for mankind is the greater capacity for variety of sensations—and absolutely nothing more".

In 1910, the eleventh edition of the Encyclopædia Britannica stated that Buckle did not define the general conceptions with which he worked: "civilization", "history", "science", "law". Therefore, "his arguments are often fallacies". Furthermore, "he sometimes altered and contorted the facts" and "he very often unduly simplified his problems". Nevertheless, "many of his ideas... have been more precisely elaborated by later writers on sociology and history" and his work was immensely valuable in provoking further research and speculation".

In A Short Biographical Dictionary of English Literature, published the same year, Scottish author John William Cousin wrote of Buckle:

Buckle is remembered for treating history as an exact science, which is why many of his ideas have passed into the common literary stock, and have been more precisely elaborated by later writers on sociology and history because of his careful scientific analyses. Nevertheless, his work is not free from one-sided views and generalisations resting on insufficient data.

In 1981, American sociologist Robert Bierstedt claimed that, in his History of Civilization in England, "Buckle criticized historians on the ground that they were too much interested in biography and in military and political history and failed to seek universal principle or laws". In contrast, "Buckle was confident that it was possible to construct a science of society on the basic of inductions from history". His difficulty was the "sheer quantity of materials that would have to be mastered." Herbert Spencer said that Buckle "'took in' more than he was able to organize".

== Works ==
"The Influence of Women on the Progress of Knowledge"

- Buckle's only lecture
- "The Influence of Women on the Progress of Knowledge" Lecture delivered at the Royal Institution and published in Fraser's Magazine 1858.

"Mill on Liberty" (a review)

- on Liberty" (a review) Fraser's Magazine, Vol. 50, May 1859, ending with Buckle's argument for immortality, 509–542.

A Letter to a Gentleman respecting Pooley's Case

- A Letter to a Gentleman respecting Pooley's Case (J. W. Parker & Son, 1859).

History of Civilization in England
Three-volume edition

- History of Civilization in England, Volume 1 (London: Longmans Green, 4th edition 1864)
- History of Civilization in England, Volume 2 (London: Longmans Green, 4th edition 1864)
- History of Civilization in England, Volume 3 (Longmans, Green, 1868)

Fragment on the Reign of Elizabeth
Unpublished fragments

- on the Reign of Elizabeth: Bishops, from the posthumous papers of Mr. Buckle in Fraser's Magazine, Vol. 75, February, 1867, 163–186.
- on the Reign of Elizabeth: Bishops, from the posthumous papers of Mr. Buckle in Fraser's Magazine, Vol. 76, September 1867, 284–300.

The Miscellaneous and Posthumous Works of Henry Thomas Buckle
Three volumes edition, edited by Helen Taylor

- The Miscellaneous and Posthumous Works of Henry Thomas Buckle, Volume 1 (Longmans, Green and Company, 1872)
- The Miscellaneous and Posthumous Works of Henry Thomas Buckle, Volume 2 (Longmans, Green and Company, 1872)
- The Miscellaneous and Posthumous Works of Henry Thomas Buckle, Volume 3 (Longmans, Green and Company, 1872)

The Miscellaneous and Posthumous Works of Henry Thomas Buckle
Two volumes new and abridged edition, edited by Grant Allen

- The Miscellaneous and Posthumous Works of Henry Thomas Buckle: A New and Abridged Edition, Volume 1 (Longmans, Green and Company, 1885)
- The Miscellaneous and Posthumous Works of Henry Thomas Buckle: A New and Abridged Edition, Volume 2 (Longmans, Green and Company, 1885)

Collected essays
One volume, editor not named

- Essays by Henry Thomas Buckle, Author of "A History of Civilization in England": With a Biographical Sketch of the Author (F. A. Brockhaus, 1867)

On Scotland and the Scotch Intellect, University of Chicago Press (1970). ("Consists of the introductory matter from v. 1 of the 1st ed. of the author's History of civilization in England (London, 1857) and the Scottish sections of the first and only ed. of v. 2 (London, 1861) plus his "Analytical table of contents ... All omissions are indicated by ellipses.") xxxviii, 414 p. 23 cm.

== Sources ==
- See his Life by A. H. Huth (1880).
- See also Ian Hesketh, The Science of History in Victorian Britain, esp. Ch. 1 on "The Enlarging Horizon: Henry Thomas Buckle's Science of History".
- Smith, George H. (2008). "Buckle, Henry Thomas (1821–1862)". In Hamowy, Ronald (ed.). The Encyclopedia of Libertarianism. Thousand Oaks, CA: Sage; Cato Institute. pp. 41–42. doi:10.4135/9781412965811.n28. ISBN 978-1412965804. LCCN 2008009151. OCLC 750831024.
- "Buckle, Henry Thomas", A Short Biographical Dictionary of English Literature, 1910 – via Wikisource
