= Johann Löwenthal =

Hungarian-British chess player

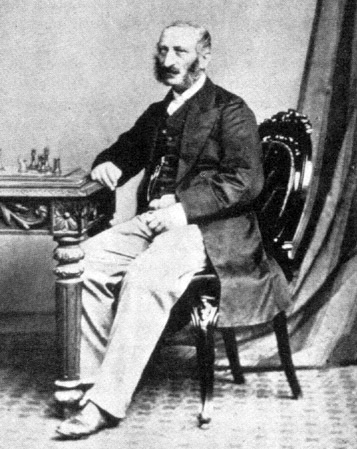

Personal information
- Born: Johann Jacob Löwenthal; 15 July 1810 Budapest, Hungary
- Died: 20 July 1876 (aged 66) Hastings, England

Chess career
- Country: Hungary (until 1849); United States (1849−1851); United Kingdom (1851−1876)
- Title: Master

Johann Jacob Löwenthal (Hungarian: Löwenthal János Jakab; 15 July 1810 – 20 July 1876) was a Hungarian-born British professional chess master. He was among the top 3 players of the 1850s.

== Biography ==
Löwenthal was born in Budapest, the son of a Jewish merchant. He was educated at the gymnasium of his native city. In 1846, he won a match against Carl Hamppe in Vienna (with 5 wins, 4 losses, and no draws). He received a civil appointment under the administration of Lajos Kossuth in 1848. On the downfall of the latter, Löwenthal was expelled from Hungary, and he emigrated to America in 1849. In 1851, he went to London and resided permanently in England thereafter. At the Manchester tournament of 1857, Löwenthal defeated Adolf Anderssen for first place.

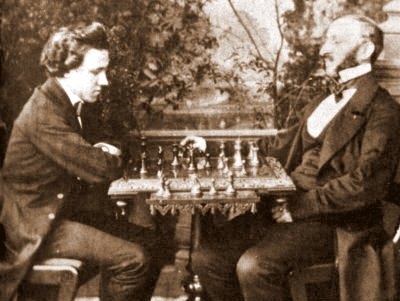
Morphy vs. Löwenthal, 1858

During his 1850 visit to New Orleans, Löwenthal played Paul Morphy on two separate occasions, losing a total of three games straight. He was one of the first masters to play a match against Morphy after the latter's arrival in London in 1858. Morphy won with a score of nine wins, three losses, and two draws. "...I am convinced that I was vanquished by superior strength," Löwenthal said about the match, as reported by an English writer named Frederick Edge, who wrote extensively about Morphy and other famous players in a book called The Exploits and Triumphs, in Europe, of Paul Morphy, the Chess Champion. No doubt aware that chess was Löwenthal's only source of livelihood, and conscious to not be considered a professional player himself, Morphy, after winning the match stakes of £100, presented Löwenthal with a gift of furniture valued at £120 for his new house.

Just days after being defeated by Morphy, Löwenthal had his greatest success by winning the British Chess Association Congress knockout tournament in Birmingham, England, on 27 August 1858. His prize was £63.

In 1860, Löwenthal took advantage of Morphy's extreme popularity to create a collection of the American master's games titled Morphy's Games of Chess. According to Morphy's biographer David Lawson, Morphy was friendly to Löwenthal and therefore agreed to sign his name to material in the book, which was purported to be written by Morphy but in fact was not.

For a time, Löwenthal served as club secretary of the St. George's Chess Club in London. He taught chess and invented the first demonstration board. He helped organise an international tournament in 1862, and then published a tournament book.

Löwenthal was for some time chess editor of The Illustrated News of the World and of The Era. He was editor also of The Chess Players' Magazine (1863–1867). In 1860, he published Morphy's Games of Chess, with Analytical and Critical Notes.

When Löwenthal became ill in 1874 and could no longer financially support himself, a collection was taken up for him. Lord Randolph Churchill and many others contributed to the charity fund. Under the influence of W. G. Ward, with whom he played chess, Löwenthal became a Roman Catholic. He died on 20 July 1876 at St. Leonards-on-Sea, near Hastings, at the age of 66.

== See also ==
- List of Jewish chess players
