= André Danican Philidor =

André Danican Philidor may refer to:

- François-André Danican Philidor (1726–1795), chess master and composer
- André Danican Philidor the elder (c. 1647–1730), Philidor l'ainé, father of François-André Danican, composer and music archivist
