= François-André Danican Philidor =

French composer and chess master (1726–1795)

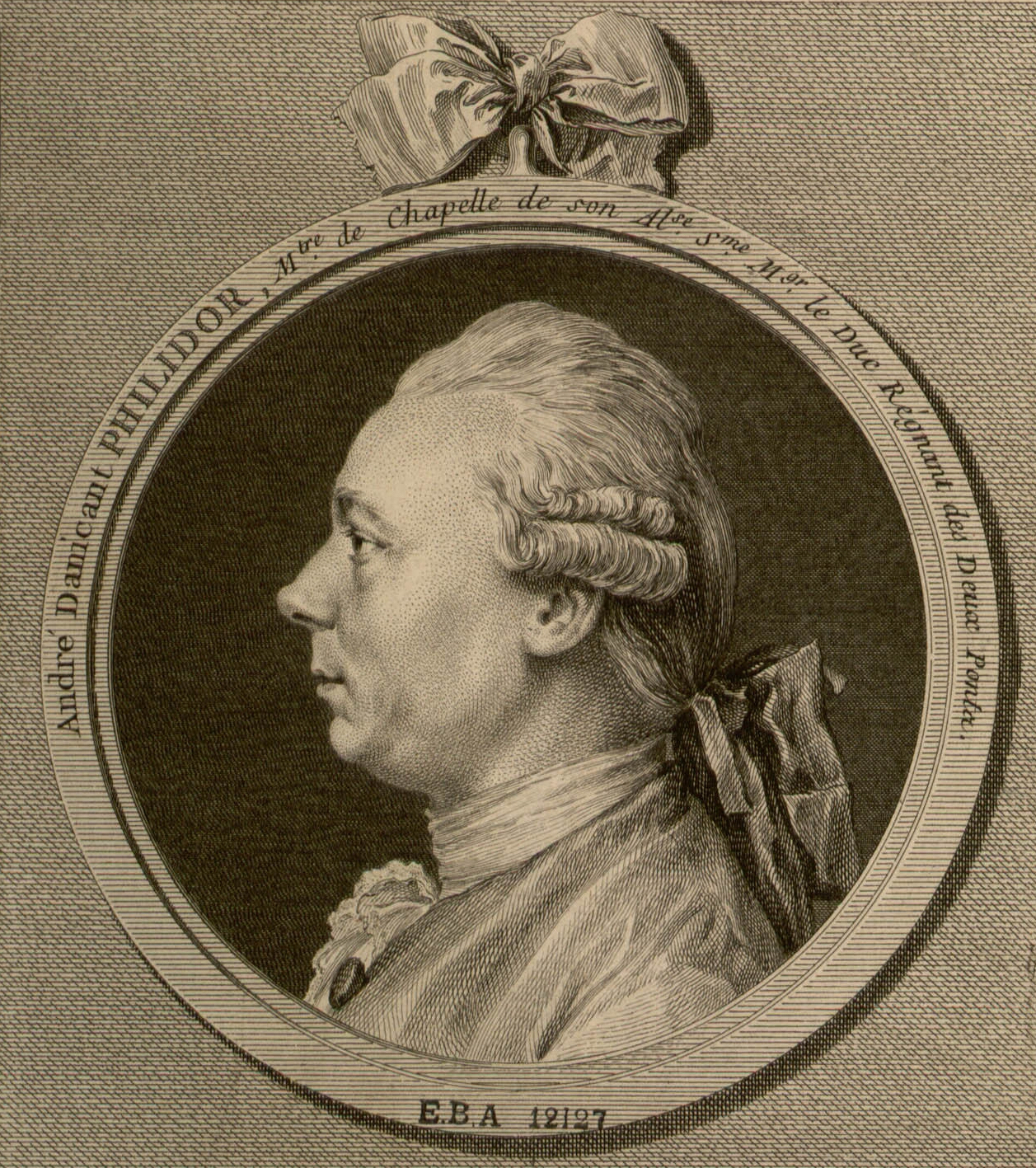
- Portrait of Philidor, 1772
- Born: François-André Danican; 7 September 1726; Dreux, France
- Died: 31 August 1795 (aged 68); London, England
- Occupations: Composer; chess master

François-André Danican Philidor (7 September 1726 – 31 August 1795), born François-André Danican and often referred to as André Danican Philidor during his lifetime, was a French composer and chess master. He contributed to the early development of the opéra comique. He is widely regarded as the best chess player of his age; his book Analyse du jeu des Échecs was considered a standard chess manual for at least a century. A chess opening, an endgame position, and a checkmate method are all named after him.

== Life ==
François-André Danican Philidor came from the well-known musical Philidor family. The family's original surname was Danican, but François-André's great-grandfather, Jean Danican Philidor, was given the nickname of Philidor by Louis XIII because his oboe playing reminded the king of an Italian virtuoso oboist named Filidori who had previously played in the choir.

Philidor was the son of André Danican Philidor the Elder, a basson-player at the court of Louis XIV. Retiring in 1724 with a pension from Louis XV, André made his home in Dreux, some 80km west of Paris, where his son was born on September 7, 1726. Philidor's mother, Anne Elisabeth Leroy, was André's second or third wife and about 40 years younger than her husband, and was described as "un-sophisticated and simple". She was also descended from a family of musicians, although it is not known if she herself was musical.

Philidor had four sisters: Helene-Elisabeth, Marie-Anne, Marie-Marguerite and Francois-Agathe; and from his father's previous marriage(s) he had three half-brothers including Anne Danican Philidor, a musician and public concert founder.

== Music career ==
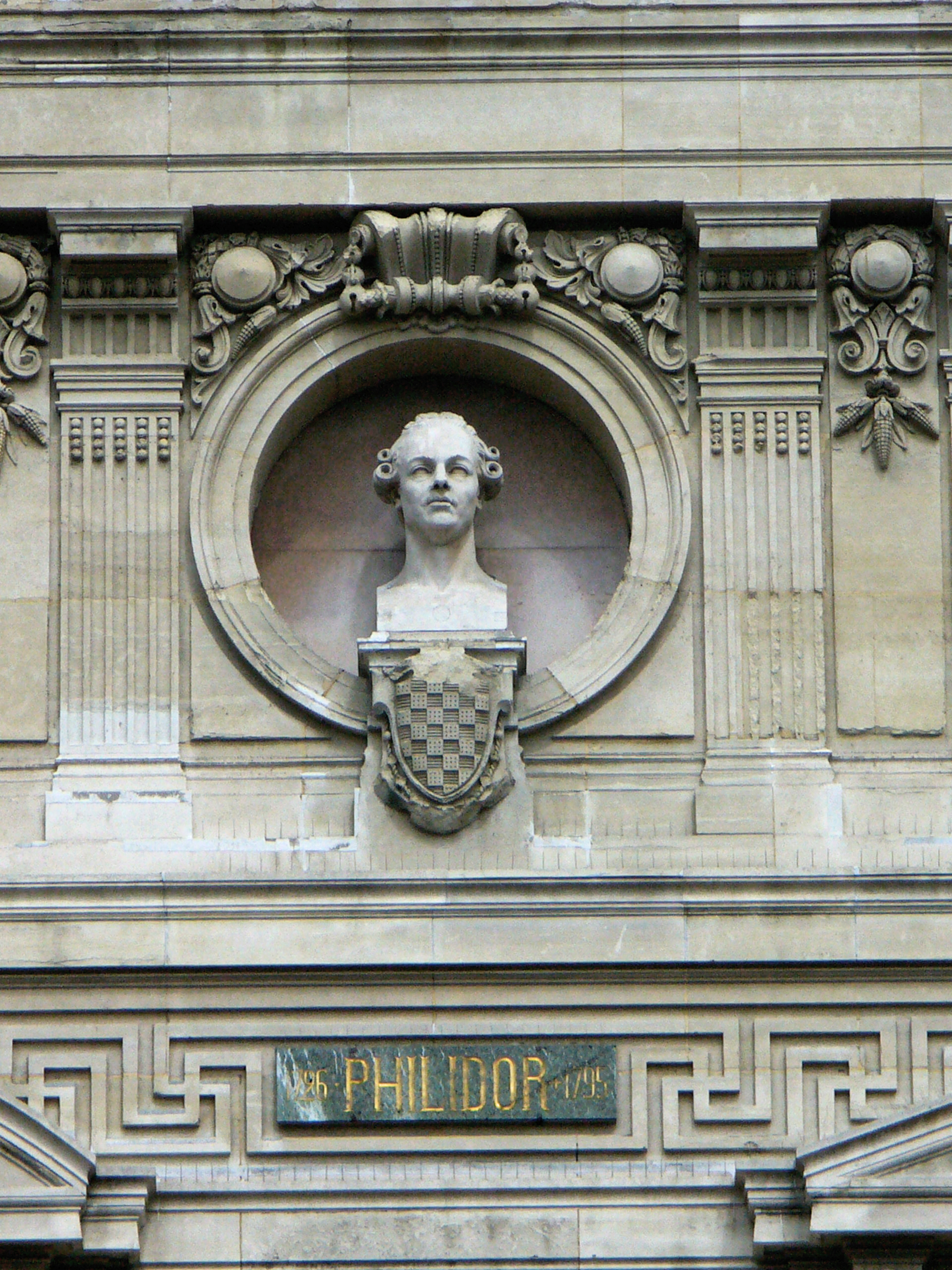
Philidor's bust on the façade of the Opera Garnier in Paris.

Philidor joined the royal choir of Louis XV in 1732 at the age of 6, and made his first attempt at the composition of a song at the age of 11. It was said that Louis XV wanted to listen to the choir almost every day, and the singers, while waiting for the king to arrive, played chess to relieve their boredom; this may have begun Philidor's interest in chess.

Starting about 1740, he lived and worked in Paris as a performer, teacher and music copyist. He was the teacher of the Bohemian composer and pianist Ludwig Wenzel Lachnith. During this time he met Diderot, who termed him "Philidor le subtil" in his publication Rameau's Nephew (Le neveu de Rameau). In 1745 Philidor was to accompany a harpsichord prodigy on a concert tour of the Netherlands; the tour failed however when the harpsichordist died suddenly. Philidor then travelled to London in 1747, where he knew many of the same people as Samuel Johnson and Charles Burney.

He returned to the French capital in 1754, resolving to devote himself seriously to musical composition, although his music was found by some to be too Italianate (as a result of his travels). However he scored several triumphs at the fair theatres, starting with Blaise le savetier in 1759. His three most successful works were Le sorcier (1764), Tom Jones (after Henry Fielding, 1765), and Ernelinde, princesse de Norvège (1767).

For a time Philidor was among the main opera composers in France, and during his musical career produced more than 20 opéra comiques and two tragédies lyriques. He also wrote secular cantatas and motets.

Philidor also wrote music for masonic rituals. The first performance of his Carmen Saeculare was performed at Freemasons' Hall, London, in 1779. He was a member of the renowned Parisian lodge Les Neuf Sœurs. This lodge had an allied society for musicians, named the Société Apollonienne.

== Chess career ==
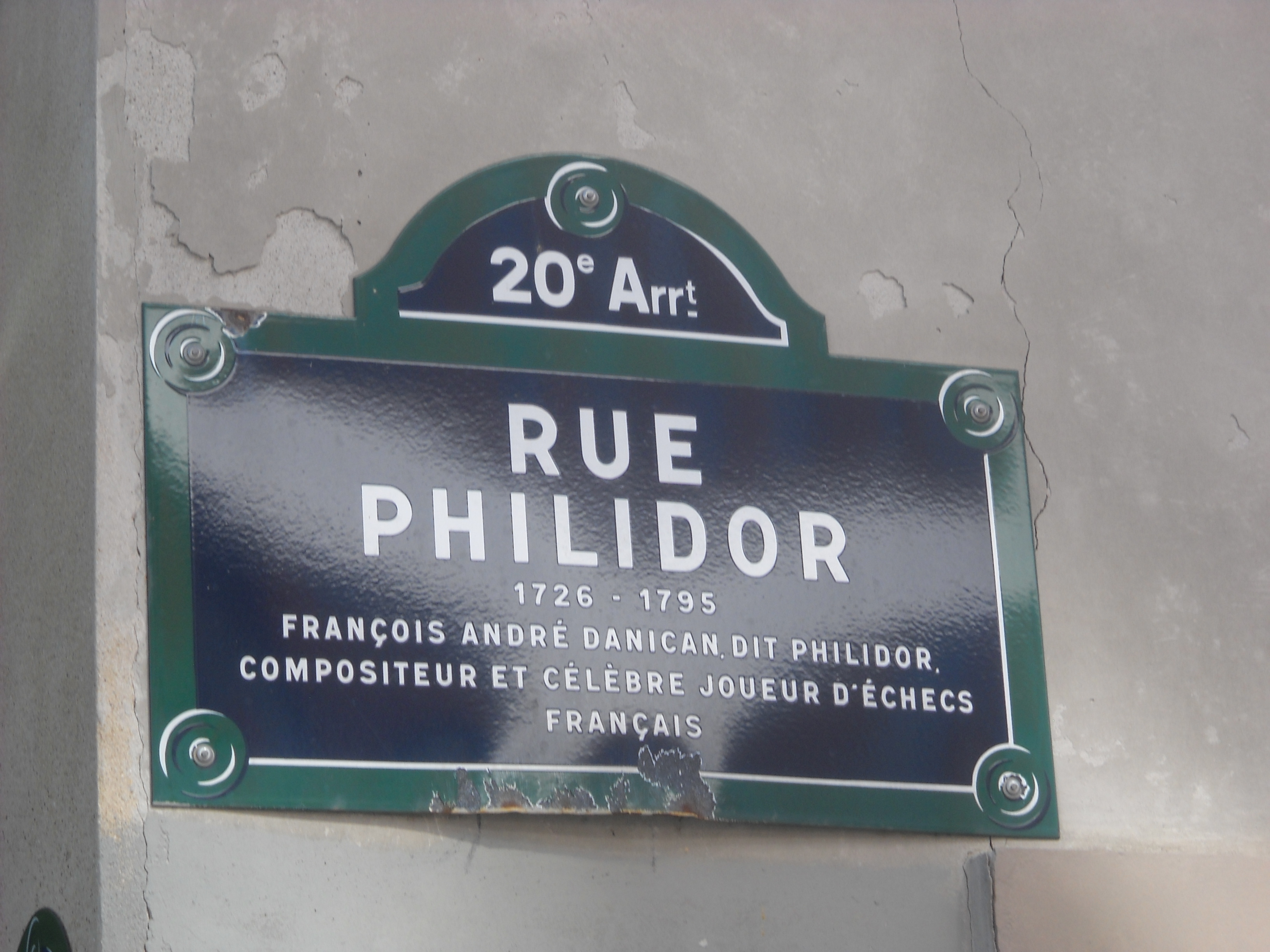
Plaque honoring François-André Danican Philidor on the street of his name in the 20th arrondissement of Paris

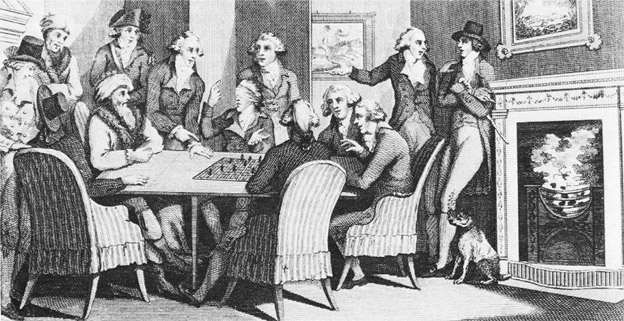
Philidor playing chess blindfolded

Philidor started playing regularly about 1740 at the best known chess venue of France, the Café de la Régence. It was also there that he played with Benjamin Franklin. The best player in France at the time, Legall de Kermeur, taught him. At first, Legall could give Philidor rook odds, a handicap in which the stronger player starts without one of his rooks, but in only three years, Philidor equalled and then surpassed him.

Philidor visited England in 1747 and decisively beat the Syrian Philipp Stamma in a match, although Philidor let Stamma have the first move in every game and scored all draws as wins for Stamma. The same year, Philidor played many games with another strong player, Sir Abraham Janssen, who was then the best player in England, and with the exception of Legall, probably the best player Philidor ever encountered. He could win on an average one game in four from Philidor at even terms, and Philidor himself declared that he could only give to Janssen one-pawn odds in exchange for making the first move with the white pieces.

In 1754, Philidor returned to France, after nine years of absence, spent mostly in the Netherlands and England. He was now a much stronger player, having successfully played opponents of the calibre of Philip Stamma and Abraham Janssen, but, as George Allen reported in The Life of Philidor, it was not until his match with Legall (also known as de Legal) in 1755 that he could be considered the strongest player in the world.

When Philidor left Paris, in 1745, although he had for some time been playing even games with M. de Legal ... he had not ceased to recognize his old master as still his master and superior. But nine years of practice, with a great variety of players, had authorized him to look for neither superior nor equal; and when, in 1755, a match was arranged between the pupil and his master, who was still at the height of his strength, the result placed the crown firmly and indisputably upon the head of Philidor.

In 1771 and 1773, Philidor briefly stayed in London to play at the Salopian coffee house, Charing Cross and at the St. James's Chess Club. In 1774, Parloe's chess club, on St James's Street in London, was created, and Philidor obtained remuneration as a chess master every year for a regular season from February to June. Philidor stayed faithful to this agreement until the end of his life, and he was replaced by Verdoni only after his death. Here, Philidor encountered George Atwood, a famous mathematician, physician and lecturer at Cambridge University. In an article by J. J. O'Connor and E. F. Robertson, devoted to George Atwood, there is the following passage: "Atwood was a renowned amateur chess-player and among other opponents played games against the famous French player Philidor, who was regarded as the unofficial world champion."

Henry Bird records:

Of the players who encountered Philidor, Sir Abraham Janssens, who died in 1775, seems to have been the best. Atwood, one of Pitt's secretaries, came next; he was of a class which we should call third or two grades of odds below Philidor, a high standard of excellence to which but few amateurs attained. One of the most interesting features of Atwood as a chess player is that he recorded and preserved some of his games, an unusual practice at that time. These records have survived, among them the last games that Philidor played, which were against Atwood at Parsloe's Club in St James's Street, London, on 20 June 1795.

In England, Philidor astounded his peers by playing three blindfold chess games simultaneously in the chess club of St James's Street on 9 May 1783. Philidor let all three opponents play white, and gave up a pawn to the third player. Some affidavits were signed, because those persons who were involved doubted that future generations would believe that such a feat was possible. Presently, three simultaneous blindfold games would be fairly unremarkable among many chess masters. Even when he was 67 years old, he played and won two blindfold games simultaneously in London in 1793.

Philidor, both in England and France, was largely recognized for both music and chess and had many admirers, protectors and friends, such as the French philosophers Voltaire, Rousseau and the famous English actor David Garrick (1717–1779).

In December 1792, however, when he was 65, Philidor was forced to leave France for England. He fled the French Revolution (1789–1799) because his name was on the Revolutionary banishment list, established by the Convention nationale. This was not probably due to his ideas (indeed it seems Philidor was rather reserved about his opinions apart from music and chess), but very likely due to the traditional attachment of his family to the King's family service.

Andrew Soltis writes that Philidor "was the best player in the world for 50 years. In fact, he was probably about 200 rating points better than anyone else yet alive—set apart by the mysteries of the game he had solved."

Also interesting is GM Boris Alterman's opinion of Philidor's play:

Five hundred years ago, chess was different from today. Pawns didn't cost as much as they do today. The best players started games with the gambits. Pawns were only a small price to: Open a file or diagonal; Create an immediate attack on an opponent's king. It was the Italian style of chess. All positions of the King's Gambit were very popular. ... The best chess player of his day was Francois Andre Danican-Philidor... His published chess strategy stood for a hundred years without significant addition or modification. He preached the value of a strong pawn center, an understanding of the relative value of the pieces, and correct pawn formations. ...

In the same article, Alterman also noticed, analyzing the game Count Brühl–Philidor, F, 0–1, London 1783, that Philidor understood very well modern concepts like the power of passed pawns, bad and good pieces, space advantage, open files, pawn structure and the importance of center.

Jacques François Mouret, one of the best French players of the early 19th century, was Philidor's great-nephew.

=== Analyse du jeu des Échecs ===
In 1749, Philidor published his famous book Analyse du jeu des Échecs. He printed a second edition in 1777 and a third in 1790. The book was such an advance in chess knowledge that, by 1871, it had gone through about 70 editions and had been translated into English, Spanish, German, Russian and Italian. In it, Philidor analyzed nine different types of game openings. Most of the openings of Philidor are designed to strengthen and establish a strong defensive center using pawns. He is the first one to realize the new role of the pawn in the chess game, and his most famous advice was the saying "The pawns are the soul of chess." More precisely, Philidor said:

Mon but principal est de me rendre recommandable par une nouveauté dont personne ne s'est avisé, ou peut-être n'a été capable; c'est celle de bien jouer les pions; ils sont l'âme des Echecs : ce sont eux-mêmes qui forment uniquement l'attaque et la défense et de leur bon ou mauvais arrangement dépend entièrement le gain ou la perte de la partie.	My main purpose is to gain recognition for myself by means of a new idea of which no one has conceived, or perhaps has been unable to practice; that is, good play of the pawns; they are the soul of chess: it is they alone that determine the attack and the defense, and the winning or losing of the game depends entirely on their good or bad arrangement.

He also included analysis of certain positions of rook and bishop versus rook, such analysis being still current theory even now. He demonstrated an important drawing technique with a rook and pawn versus rook endgame in what is known as the Philidor position. The Philidor Defense (1.e4 e5 2.Nf3 d6) is named for him. Philidor's book was the very first to give detailed annotations on how to play the middlegame, present chess strategy as a whole, and present the concepts of the blockade, prophylaxis, positional sacrifice and mobility of the pawn formation.

Early critics of the Analyse du jeu des Échecs include those of the Modenese School (Ercole del Rio, Lolli or Ponziani), who in contrast to the French, advocated a free piece play, gambit openings and tactical complications; they also found some of the variations reported in the Analyse to be unsound (in particular those related with ...f7–f5 push in the Philidor Defence: 1.e4 e5 2.Nf3 d6 3.d4 f5). Some of Philidor's disciples—Bernard, Carlier, Leger, and Verdoni, who met at the Café de la Régence by the name of the Société des Amateurs—also criticized his work. In their book, Traité des Amateurs, they expressed many criticisms and comments on his earlier printed book, arguing that the variations reported in Philidor's Analyse are more instructive than correct. Nevertheless, the games in the Traité can be regarded, together of those of Philidor, as typical examples of the understanding of chess during the Enlightenment, and the Société des Amateurs was much more like Philidor than the Modenese school.

=== Notable games ===
- Captain Smith vs. François André Philidor, London, England 1790, Bishop's Opening: Berlin Defense (C24), 0–1. A good sample of Philidor's ideas about pawns; plus a nice mating combination at the end.
- François André Philidor vs. NN, Unknown 1749, Bishop's Opening: Boi Variation (C23), 1–0. This game—possibly a composition by Philidor—demonstrates the value of passed pawns.
- François André Philidor vs "The Turk".

== Final years ==
Philidor was stranded in England when the French Revolution occurred. Because of his royal associations mentioned above, the revolutionary government put his name on the banned list. He died on 31 August 1795 in London, and was buried on 3 September in St James's Church, Piccadilly. A few days later, his relatives succeeded in getting his name removed from the banned list.

Being buried with no memorial stone, Philidor's resting-place had become a mystery by the 1840s, causing an Australian tourist to write to Howard Staunton in 1842 that "It is to the everlasting disgrace of English amateurs that Philidor's place of interment is not known". This remained the case until 1926, the bicentenary of his birth, when researcher John Keeble reported finding Philidor in St James's Church burial register to The Times newspaper's chess correspondent Edward Tinsley.

== Chess topics named after him ==
Philidor's name is used for three well-known chess topics:

- The Philidor Defence, an opening he advocated;
- Philidor's legacy, a type of smothered mate (in fact discovered centuries before Philidor);
- Philidor's position, several endgame positions.

== Battez Philidor! ==
A one-act opéra comique with music by Amédée Dutacq and libretto by Abraham Dreyfus entitled Battez Philidor! (Beat Philidor!) was premiered on 13 November 1882 at the Opéra-Comique. Set in 1777, a poor musician is required to beat Philidor at chess before he can marry his sweetheart. Although Philidor agrees to lose the match to help, by distraction he nonetheless wins the game, although all ends well for the lovers eventually. Battez Philidor! also features Philidor's sometime collaborator A. A. H. Poinsinet.

== Works ==
Philidor wrote 27 operas as well as 3 musical tragedies.

== Popular culture ==
Philidor occurs as a subject of conversation of Marius Goring's character Conductor 71 in the film A Matter of Life and Death. David Niven's character Peter is a chess enthusiast (as was Niven himself), and the Conductor tries to tempt Peter to stay in the afterlife by offering him the opportunity to pit his skills against the great chess masters of the past, including Philidor himself.
