= Traité des Amateurs =

Book on chess

Page from the Traité, fourth edition (1837)

Traité des Amateurs is the short name of the chess treatise Traité Théorique et Pratique du jeu des Echecs, par une Société des Amateurs, published in France in 1786 and subsequently translated into German and English.

A reviewer in 1830 wrote that:

The Traite des Amateurs, is one of the best practical works on Chess, extant. It contains a great number of beautifully played games, together with much solid information, and it is matter of regret that the scarcity of the book, prevents its being more generally used by the Chess student.

== Le Traité des Amateurs ==
Le Traité des Amateurs is a chess treatise composed by a "Society of Amateurs" who were contemporaries of Philidor and all frequented the Café de la Régence in Paris. Of these, the strongest players were Bernard, Carlier, Leger and Verdoni. Philidor, who lived in London, took no part in writing the Traité des Amateurs (which embodies many criticisms and comments on his earlier book). George Walker, in his translation of the Traité for the Chess Player's Chronicle in 1846, states:

In making up the work before us, it is understood that the great masters above named produced most of their games and examples, by playing them over, experimentally and repeatedly, with each other; consulting upon the moves in committee, and noting down the details and variations contingent upon each result. The natural consequence of this develops itself in the practical character of the Treatise; presenting, indeed, fully as much the complexion of a vast collection of first-rate games, played out, mostly even to the closing Checkmate, as that of a general work on the subject of Chess.

The work is divided into six chapters which are in turn subdivided into sections, games and comments. The first three chapters treat entire games, in which odds are supposed to be given; the fourth chapter is devoted to the consideration of "even" games (no handicap); the fifth concerns the endgame and the sixth consists of a selection of critical situations from Stamma, upon which Ponziani sarcastically remarked:

i quali sono tutti di Filippo Stamma; quando avrebbero potuto più plausibilmente cavarli dal proprio fondo (they found it easier to take positions from Stamma than to compose new ones for themselves)

Another common point with Stamma is the usage of his algebraic chess notation, which was employed in the French editions of the Traité. From the beginning the authors distance themselves from Philidor's Analyse du jeu des Échec, arguing that the variations reported by the celebrated French master are more instructive than correct. Nevertheless, the games analyzed in the text can be regarded as typical examples of the understanding of chess during the Enlightenment, and the group was much closer to Philidor than to the Italians Ercole del Rio, Lolli or Ponziani of the Modenese school. The Italians (in contrast to the French) advocated free piece play, gambit openings and tactical complications. Because of its practical orientation, the work was published at the end of the 18th century together with the more theoretical textbook of Philidor.

During the Romantic era, the play of amateurs was considered slow and monotonous; however, the modern point of view gives greater consideration to the game of the Romantic period than of the Enlightenment (a good thing, considering the fact that we have the transcription of many more games from the former period than the latter). The most obvious difference between these two ways of playing chess are the respective focus on the dynamic and static factors of the game (giving to the terms "dynamic" and "static" the meanings popularized by Valery Beim in his books). In the introduction to the Traité and in the notes to the games, however, there are some important considerations that can be defined as modern. The authors, in fact, stress the concept that at the beginning of the game the forces stand in equilibrium. Correct play on both sides maintains this equilibrium, and leads to a drawn game; therefore, a player can win only as a consequence of an error made by the opponent. From this perspective there is no such thing as a winning move, and even the most skilled master can do nothing against these "natural laws" of the game. This point of view was later independently developed by Wilhelm Steinitz; today it represents the basis of modern chess theory, but at the time it was proposed by Steinitz it was in strong contrast with the Romantic concept of chess. According to this concept, it was the stronger player's higher imagination and combinative power (or, in other words, his Wille zur Macht) which decided the outcome of the game; this was explained by Richard Réti. Traité des Amateurs, however, also differs from Philidor—not concerning the general idea of the "natural laws" of the game, but on the evaluation of White's move advantage. According to Philidor (as reported in the Traité), White's initial advantage was enough to guarantee, with perfect play, the win of the first player. The authors of the Traité, on the other hand, disagreed and believed that the advantage derived from the first move would only give (with perfect play) a temporary initiative to the first player; a game correctly played by both sides was always destined to be drawn.

As an example, the introductive section of Chapter IV (Games in which no Odds are given) in G. Walker's translation states:

The combinations being endless, it is clear that the winning or losing of the game, between players equal in point of skill, must depend on the first bad, or what amounts to the same thing, the first lost move on either side; we cannot, therefore, avoid protesting against the erroneous doctrine laid down by Philidor and others, that he who has the first move, ought to win the game in consequence of that advantage. We proceed to prove, from the very games adduced by Philidor in support of his position, these three important points. Firstly, that the move alone can never be considered a sufficient advantage to insure success : Secondly, that he who has not the move, will very soon acquire it, or neutralize its effects; and, Lastly, that supposing each move to be the best that could possibly be played, the game ought to be drawn.

== Games from the Traité ==
The games of the Traité des Amateurs are rare, and cannot be found in common chess databases like ChessBase, 365chess, chessbites or chesslab. Some of them (from Chapter 4, "Games where no odds were given") are reported here, with the original comments.

- Game 3 in Chapter 4, Section 1:
  1. e4 e5 2. Nf3 d6 3. d4 f5 4. dxe5 If you were to take in f5, he would move e5–e4 and afterwards ...Bxf5 4... fxe4 5. Ng5 d5 6. f4 Instead of this pawn you should move 6.e6, which would compel him to move 6...Nh6; you would then push 7.c4 and have a very fine game 6... Bc5 7. c4 c6 8. Nc3 Ne7 9. h4 You play thus, to avoid having a doubled P. on the rook file, which would be the case were he to push ...h6 and then take in ...Bxh3 after you Kt. retreats 9... h6 10. Nh3 0-0 11. Na4 Bb4+ 12. Bd2 Bxd2+ 13. Qxd2 d4! 14. c5 To cut off the communications between his pawns; but as he answers with ...b5 you are forced to take en passant restoring the desired communication 14... b5 15. cxb6 axb6 16. b3 Be6 17. Be2 Nf5! This Kt. controls g3 and will constrain white pieces until Black will prepare his pieces for the final assault to the adverse K., which White cannot avoid 18. Ng1 Ng3 19. Rh2 e3 20. Qb2 d3 21. Bf3 Rxf4 22. 0-0-0 Rfxa4! 23. bxa4 Rxa4 24. a3 Rc4+ 25. Kb1 Rc2 26. Qb4 Na6 27. Qf4 Nc5 28. Qxg3 Ba2+ 29. Ka1 Nb3#
- Game 7 in Chapter 4, Section 1:
  1. e4 e5 2. c4 This is not a good move because it weakens the square 'd4'. 2... Bc5 3. Nc3 Nf6 4. Be2 Nc6 5. d3 d6 6. Bg5 0-0 7. Nf3 h6 8. Bxf6 Qxf6 9. Nd5 Qd8 10. 0-0 Nd4 11. b4 Nxf3+ 12. Bxf3 Bd4! He fixes a Bishop in your game, which you will not be able to remove. 13. Rb1 c6 14. Ne3 g6 15. Bg4 f5 16. exf5 gxf5 17. Bh5 Qg5 18. Qf3 Kh7 19. Kh1 a6 This move is necessary to open the way for his Bishop. (This is a very weak move notwithstanding – Note from Staunton in The Chess Player's Chronicle, 1846) 20. Qh3 f4 21. Ng4 Rg8 22. f3 Be6 23. g3 Play as you will you lose; because you cannot prevent his moving Ta8–f8–f5. 23... fxg3 24. Qxg3 Raf8 25. Qh3 Rf5 26. Rg1 Bxg1 27. Rxg1 Kh8! 0–1 The tyro will observe that if 27...Qxh5?? then 28.Nf6+ and it is White that wins.
- Game 6 in Chapter 4, Section 2:
  1. e4 e5 2. f4 exf4 3. Bc4 Qh4+ This check is bad; he should rather have played 3...f5 or 3...g5. 4. Kf1 d6 5. Nf3 Bg4 6. d4 g5 7. Nc3 Qh5 8. h4 h6 9. Kf2 Bxf3 10. gxf3 Qg6 11. hxg5 Qxg5 12. Ne2 (White should have played 12. Bxf4 Qxf4 13. Nd5 with a won game. Note by George Walker in The Chess Player's Chronicle 1846) 12... Nd7 13. Nxf4 Qd8 14. c3 Nb6 15. Bd3 Qd7 16. Be3 0-0-0 17. a4 Kb8 18. a5 Nc8 19. b4 c6 20. b5 (Well played, George Walker, The Chess Player's Chronicle, 1846) 20... cxb5 21. a6 b6 22. Qb3 Nf6 23. Bxb5 Qc7 24. d5 Bg7 25. Bc6 Nd7 26. Nd3 Ne5 27. Nxe5 Bxe5 28. f4 Bg7 29. Bd4 Bxd4+ 30. cxd4 Double pawns here are not a disadvantage, rather the contrary. 30... Qe7 31. Kf3 Rdg8 32. Rac1 Rg6 33. Bb7 Rhg8 34. Rxc8+ Rxc8 35. Bxc8 Kxc8 36. Rc1+ Kb8 37. Qc4 Qd7 38. f5 Rg8 39. Qc6 Qxc6 40. dxc6 Kc7 41. d5 h5 42. Rh1 Rh8 43. Rg1 Rh7 44. Rg8 b5 If Black were to advance ...h4, he would be too late by one move, i.e. 44...h4 45.Ra8 h3 46.Rxa7+ Kc8 47.Ra8+ Kc7 48.a7 h2 49.Rc8+ Kxc8 50.a8=Q+ and checkmate follows in three moves 45. Ra8 Kb6 46. Rb8+ Kc7 47. Rb7+ Kd8 48. e5! You sacrifice this pawn in order to push the 'd' pawn forwards to support the 'c' pawn. 48... dxe5 49. d6 Kc8 50. d7+ Kd8 1–0 White forces checkmate in three moves.

== La Société des Amateurs ==
La Société des Amateurs was a group of an unknown number of chess masters and players at the Café de la Régence in Paris and authors of the Traité des Amateurs. Only four masters of the group (who were considered the strongest) are known: Bernard, Carlier, Leger and Verdoni. Apart from Verdoni (who is the only one of the Amateurs with his own entry in the Oxford Companion to Chess), not very much is known about the lives of these masters. Their first names and places and dates of birth or death are generally unknown (although Verdoni's death year is known). However, they appear periodically in the chess literature of the time, and consequently it is possible to provide some details on their lives and playing styles. Concerning their games, several of Verdoni's games are known, while only one game of Bernard and Carlier playing together and winning against Philidor (who gives to them the advantage of Pawn and Move) survives. Verdoni, Bernard, Carlier and Leger, although not approaching Philidor's level, were considered the best in the world in the years following his death.

Directly or indirectly (since Verdoni moved to London after the publication of Traité), they competed with each other for the title of Philidor's successor. No records of their games survive, so it is impossible to assess the relative strengths of each player. Deschapelles, however, reported that Philidor classed Legalle as a player equal to himself, Verdoni as one to receive pawn for the move, and Bernard and Carlier as P and move players.

=== Bernard ===
Bernard was probably the best chess player at the Café de la Régence around the end of the 18th century, at least until the arrival of Alexandre Deschapelles on the world chess scene in 1798. According to George Walker, Deschapelles noted:

I acquired chess, in four days! I learned the moves, played with Bernard, who had succeeded Philidor as the sovereign of the board; lost the first day, the second, the third, and beat him even-handed on the fourth; since which time I have never advanced or receded. Chess to me has been, and is, a single idea, which, once acquired, cannot be displaced from its throne, while the intellect remains unimpaired by sickness or age.

In 1783, he was among the masters (the others were Philidor and Verdoni), who played and won against The Turk during the Automaton's European tour in Paris. Although (as already mentioned) only one game of Bernard survives, there is evidence in the literature that his play was more brilliant (which means more inclined toward tactical complications) than that of the other amateurs. Bernard and Carlier initiated Jacques François Mouret (a great-nephew of Philidor) in the game; Mouret later become one of the best French players of the early 19th century.

=== Carlier ===
While some sources indicate Bernard was the strongest player between the death of Philidor and the arrival of Deschapelles, others prefer Carlier:

M. Bouncourt est contemporain de Philidor; il n'a jamais joué avec ce grand artiste, mais il a fait la partie de ses éléves, Carlier, Bernard et Léger. A cette époque Philidor avait émigré en Angleterre, ou il est mort en 1795, je crois. Carlier, le plus fort d'entre eux, se retira devant M. Descaplelles, qui n'avait point the rival (Mr. Bouncourt is a contemporary of Philidor; he never played with this great artist, but he did with some of his pupils, Carlier, Bernard and Leger. At that time Philidor had emigrated to England, where he died in 1795, I think. Carlier, the strongest of the group surrendered to Mr. Descaplelles, who at this point had not a rival)

It is unknown if Carlier's "surrender" is due to a specific event (like a match with Deschapelles), but the two played together and at one point were "seeded" in the chess life of the French capital:

The Gentleman's Mag., July, 1807, contained an account of a series of games played between two committees headed respectively by Deschapelles and Carlier.

=== Leger ===
Other references consider Leger as the successor of Philidor, although he was roughly the same strength as Carlier. In Journoud's Nouvelle régence, for instance, Leger is defined "le fameux Léger, le successeur de Philidor", while Carlier is "l'antagoniste, le rival de Léger". The story continues:

ils ont joué dix ans ensemble, et pendant ces dix ans, ils n'ont fait que dus parties nulles Enfin, il y a six mois que Léger eu gagna une: Carlier prit sa revanche le lendemain. (they played ten years together, and during these ten years, they only did drawn games. Finally, six months ago Leger won a game: Carlier took his revenge the next day.)

On the French front, each of the three players had his supporters and some right to consider himself the successor of Philidor and there was never an "official" match among them in order to determine who was the strongest player in France. The same article in the Nouvelle régence continues, saying that after the aforementioned episode Carlier and Leger never played together again.

Depuis ce moment, ils respectent assez leur réputation; il se respectent assez eux-mêmes pour ne plus jouer l'un contre l'autre... Et puis, il y a eu des propos... Des gens mal intentionnés ont rapporté à Carlier que Léger s'était vanté de lui céder le trait Oh ! si nous n'avions étouffé l'affaire, elle eurait eu des suites mais elle s'est fort bien passée; quoique, depuis ce temps, ils ne se parlent jamais. (Since that time, they respect enough their reputation; they respected themselves enough to stop playing against each other... And then, there was a problem... Ill-intentioned people reported to Carlier that Leger had boasted that he could have given the move to him. Oh! if we had stifled the case, it could have had consequences, but it did not, though, since that time, they never speak again.)

After Philidor left France for England neither Bernard, Carlier or Leger could enjoy the status of best player in France. As G. Allen explains in his Life of Philidor, Legal attained an advanced old age of nearly 90 years. From his defeat to Philidor in the match of 1755 until his death, he maintained his rank as the second-best player in France. The three were probably inferior to Legal, and only after his death in 1792 could one of them aspire to the throne of the Café de la Régence.

=== Verdoni ===
The amateur who moved to England, however, appears to enjoy wider recognition as best player in the country and perhaps the world. The Oxford Companion to Chess reports that Verdoni (?–1804), Italian, learned chess only in middle age and (unusually) became a master. After Philidor's death (1795), Verdoni was considered (especially in England) one of the strongest players in the world and took Philidor's place as house professional at Parsloe's. He mentored Jacob Sarratt until he died in 1804. Verdoni was called by Löwenthal "the immediate successor of Philidor upon the English chess-throne", but Philidor was clearly his superior and was used to give to Verdoni the Pawn. Allen and Von der Lasa wrote in The Life of Philidor that Philidor gave the advantage of the Pawn to Verdoni, but he received the Move in exchange.

Verdoni is described as the strongest player in the world between 1795 (Philidor's death) and 1804 (his own). An argument cited to support this choice is that Philidor (as reported by Lewis) said, "(Verdoni) c'est le premier joueur en Europe après moi".

Both Philidor and Verdoni moved to England during the French Revolution, and they spent the rest of their lives there. Consequently, Philidor was aware of the evolution of the skills of Verdoni but not of Bernard, Carlier or Leger. Secondly, the English chess world is better-documented than the French; British chess players started earlier than their colleagues across the Channel to record and annotate their games. The games played by Philidor and his contemporaries were recorded by George Atwood in a manuscript later found and published by George Walker. Walker took pains to report for posterity many games played in those years, and another Walker (Greenwood) transcribed the games of the La Bourdonnais – McDonnell chess matches. In France there was less attention, and the majority of the games of that period are lost. We have many games of Verdoni but virtually none of Bernard, Carlier or Leger. The surviving Philidor games date to the period when the Frenchman lived in London. There are very few games of Deschapelles, and nearly all of them were played against English players. There is the possibility that the presumed dominance of Verdoni over the other amateurs is due to the fact that we have information about his play while Bernard, Carlier and Leger have almost fallen into oblivion.

=== The other Amateurs ===
Bernard, Carlier, Leger and Verdoni were not the only amateurs. Walker states clearly that these players were the "chief in skill", but not the only members of La Société des Amateurs. Additionally, in an article first published in The Chess World we can find the following sentence:

With Bernard, Carlier, Verdoni, Leger and the rest of the Amateurs our chess Count stood upon the footing of intimacy

which also indicates that La Société des Amateurs was composed of other players beside those known.

Most of the games in the Traité were actually played by the amateurs and in many of them, one of the players gives an advantage to the opponent. Bernard, Carlier, Leger and Verdoni were approximately of the same strength, and played together on even terms. Consequently, the games "at odds" should have been played with other members of La Société des Amateurs. The names of the other amateurs, however, are lost and cannot be found in the documents of the period. Richard Twiss, however, reports a detail which can help in detecting some of these players. In 1783 a new chess club was established in Paris, and the known amateurs (together with some followers) moved from la Régence to this new club. Twiss reports the names of some of these players; there is the possibility that some of them were also part of the original group which collaborated on the Traité. The only player among those mentioned by Twiss who could play on even terms with Bernard, Carlier, Leger or Verdoni was Garnier; then, a list of players used to receive an advantage is reported.

The best players are Mr. Bernard, Mr. Carlier, Mr. Verdoni, Mr. Leger, and Mr. Garnier; who being only of the second class of players, are not able to cope with Mr. de Legalle or Mr. Philidor, without receiving a pawn and the move. Then follow the gentlemen to whom a pawn and two moves are given; the Count de Biffy and Chevaliers de Beaurevoir, de la Pallu and d'Anfelet.

Almost nothing is known about these players. Garnier was one of the subscribers to Phildor's book's second edition (in the list are also the Count of Biffy, Bernard, Leger and Legall). Probably the Chevalier de Beaurevoir is the best-known of the group. A few games between him and Philidor, in fact, survive. G. Walker reported these games with a brief note explaining that De Beaurevoir acquired a reputation in France for his skill at chess. For this reason, he thought while visiting London in 1788 he could play with Philidor at the Pawn and move. Philidor, however, gave him the advantage of pawn and two moves, and won the majority of a series of games played between them. These games were later reviewed by von der Lasa as examples of Philidor's play.
