= Moses Hirschel =

Maskil Moses Hirschel (13 September 1754 – 24 June 1818 Breslau) was a German writer, polemicist and chess author.

Hirschel was a representative of the Haskalah, or Jewish Enlightenment, in Kingdom of Prussia toward the end of the 18th century.

He published the first German translation of the chess writings of Gioachino Greco, together with a re-edition of Philipp Stamma in Das Schach des Herrn Giochimo Greco Calabrois und die Schachspiel Geheimniße des Arabers Philipp Stamma übersezt, verbeßert und nach einer ganz neuen Methode zur Erleichterung der Spielenden umgearbeitet (Breslau 1784, Nachdruck Zürich: Olms 1979 und 1987). Hirschel's translation of the two chess classics was significant as their publication helped to popularize algebraic notation in Germany.

He also wrote Ueber das Schachspiel, dessen Nutzen, Gebrauch und Mißbrauch, psychologisch, moralisch und scientisisch erörtert (Breslau 1791).

Hirschel also published the following polemic works which were influential in the inner Jewish debates of the late 18th Century: Kampf der Jüdischen Hierarchie (Breslau 1789); Jüdische Intoleranz und Fanatismus in Breslau (1789); Patriotische Bemerkungen (1790); Ueber die Allzufrühen Ehen der Jüdischen Nation (Breslau 1790); Biographie des Jüdischen Gelehrten und Dichters Ephraim Moses Kuh (Zurich, 1791); Apologie der Menschenrechte (Zurich, 1793); Vier Briefe über Schlesien (Breslau 1796).

Disappointed with the lack of reform within the Breslau Rabbinat at the time, Hirschel converted to Lutheranism with his entire family on 25 May 1804 taking the name "Christian Moritz Herschel".
