= Legall de Kermeur =

French chess player

François Antoine de Legall de Kermeur
Personal information
- Born: Legall de Kermeur; 4 September 1702 Versailles
- Died: 1792 (aged c. 90) Paris

Chess career
- Country: France
- Title: best chess player in the world

François Antoine de Legall de Kermeur (1702–1792) was a French chess player, and was possibly the world's best player from about 1730 to 1755.

His name is variously written Kermur, Sire de Legalle, by Twiss, and Kermur and Kermuy, Sire de Legal, by others. In the List of Subscribers to Philidor's second edition it stands as in Twiss, but the spelling was, probably, in both cases Philidor's own.

Along with other famous players, he played in Paris's Café de la Régence, and is considered to have been possibly the strongest player in the world around the 1730s. He taught chess to François-André Philidor.

The following portrayal of Legall is given in the London Magazine, May 1825, in an article titled "Chess and Chess Players by an ancient Amateur":

I am probably, without any exception, the oldest chess-player in Europe. I have not only had the honour of contending "on the checquer'd field" with M. Philidor, but I have frequently played at the Cafe de la Regence with M. de Legalle, the master of that distinguished Professor, who, in my younger days, was a better player than his celebrated pupil. There is no man of whose person and deportment I retain a more vivid recollection than M. de Legalle; he was a thin, pale old gentleman, who had sat in the same seat at the Cafe, and worn the same green coat for a great number of years when I first visited Paris. While he played at chess, he took snuffs in such profusion that his chitterling frill was literally saturated with stray particles of the powder, and he was, moreover, in the habit of enlivening the company during the progress of the game, by a variety of remarks, which every body admired for their brilliancy, and which struck me perhaps the more forcibly, as I was at that time but indifferently acquainted with the French tongue.

In the book The life of Philidor, the following considerations, which can give us an idea about de Legall's strength at the chessboard are reported:

M. de Kermur, Sire de Legal, at that time about forty years old, reigned supreme in that famous Cafe, and was undoubtedly a player of extraordinary strength; for Philidor alone was ever able to beat him, and that, too, not until he had developed his entire force by playing with Sir Abraham Janssen and the Syrian Stamma(*). The "first player of the band" found it necessary to accept the Rook from M. de Legal; and it took full three years to work his way up, through the various degrees of odds, to the honour of confronting his master, on even terms, as a "first-rate".

(*) Fetis says that old chess-players at the Cafe de la Regence had repeated to him Philidor's own statement, that he did not attain his full strength until he had made his campaigns in Holland and in England.

Thus, Legal was probably the strongest player of the Café de la Régence and probably in the world until 1755 when he lost a match to Philidor. It is not known if he traveled or played in other countries besides France, but since the Café de la Régence was the chess Mecca of the time, most of the strongest players of the 18th century, sooner or later, ended up at the Café and the strongest among them played Legal.

It is known that he played with Sir Abraham Janssen, the strongest English player according to Philidor himself. G. Allen refers that Legal was of the same opinion of Philidor regarding the skills of Janssen over the board. This could indicate that, at even terms, Janssen won approximately only one fourth of the games played with Legal as he did with Philidor, but this is not completely clear from Allen's text if this interpretation is correct. The chess encounter between Legal and Janssen happened, according to aforementioned author, after the match between Philidor and Janssen and, thus, must be collocated after 1747.

It is also very likely, as also suggested by Allen, that Legall played Stamma, since the latter lived for a certain period in Paris where he published the Essai sur le jeu des echecs in 1737. If this is correct, Legal would have played Stamma before Philidor began to attend the Café de la Régence.

Legal lived to nearly ninety years old. After his defeat with Philidor in the match of 1755 and up to the time of his death, however, he maintained his rank as the second player of France. Thus, it is also highly probable that he played, with an overall favourable outcome, against the disciples of Philidor of the Société des Amateurs (Bernard, Carlier, Leger and Verdoni).

Legall is the eponym of Legall's mate, a mating pattern found in his only extant game, Legall–Saint Brie, Paris, 1750.
