= Stamma =

Stamma may refer to:

- Stamma, the British Stammering Association
- Philipp Stamma, ( – c. 1755), a chess master

== See also ==
- Stammer
