= Jean Danican Philidor =

French court musician

Jean Danican (D'Anican) Philidor (c. 1620 – September 8, 1679) was a court musician at Versailles during the reign of Louis XIII, and a member of the prestigious Philidor family. The name Philidor was conferred upon Jean's elder brother, Michel Danican (c. 1610–1659), by Louis XIII, when his oboe playing reminded the monarch of the Italian virtuoso oboe player, Filidori of Siena; however, Michel never formally adopted the surname. Jean is the first individual to be found documented as "Danican dit Filidor" (or "Danican called Philidor"), and evidence implies that he assumed the name at the time of his brother's death, in 1659.

== Musical career ==
While he was perhaps best known for his virtuosic oboe playing, Jean Danican Philidor was a versatile member of the French musical court, also playing the fife, crumhorn, and trumpet marine.

=== Chronology ===
- By 1645:
  - Royal Service - Oboist in the Musketeers
  - Member of the Grande Ecurie, a "branch of the royal musical establishment that supported military and other outdoor performances"
- By 1654:
  - Member of the "Cromornes et Trompettes Marines"
- By 1659:
  - Member of "Fifres et Tambours", or the "Fife and Drum Corps"

=== Composition ===
It is likely that Jean Danican Philidor was a composer of dance suites; however, scholars are uncertain whether works signed "Philidor le père" are composed by Jean Danican, or his son André, who was also known as Philidor l'Ainé (Philidor the elder).

=== Development of the oboe ===
Jean Danican and his brother Michel were among the first ever professional oboe players. Along with other prominent musical families at court, like the Chédevilles and the Hotteterres, they were responsible for the oboe's transformation from its Medieval form, the shawm, to the three-joint structure that remains in use today.

== Family ==
Jean Danican had two accomplished musical sons, André Danican Philidor (1647–1730) and Jacques Danican Philidor (1657–1708), known respectively as Philidor l'ainé (Philidor the elder) and Philidor le cadet (Philidor the younger). His grandson, François-André, son of Philidor the elder, was a renowned musician and chess player.
