= The Chess Players (Favén) =

1913 painting by Antti Favén

- Shakki pelaajat or Vanhoja shakkimestareita (Finnish), Schackspelarna (Swedish)
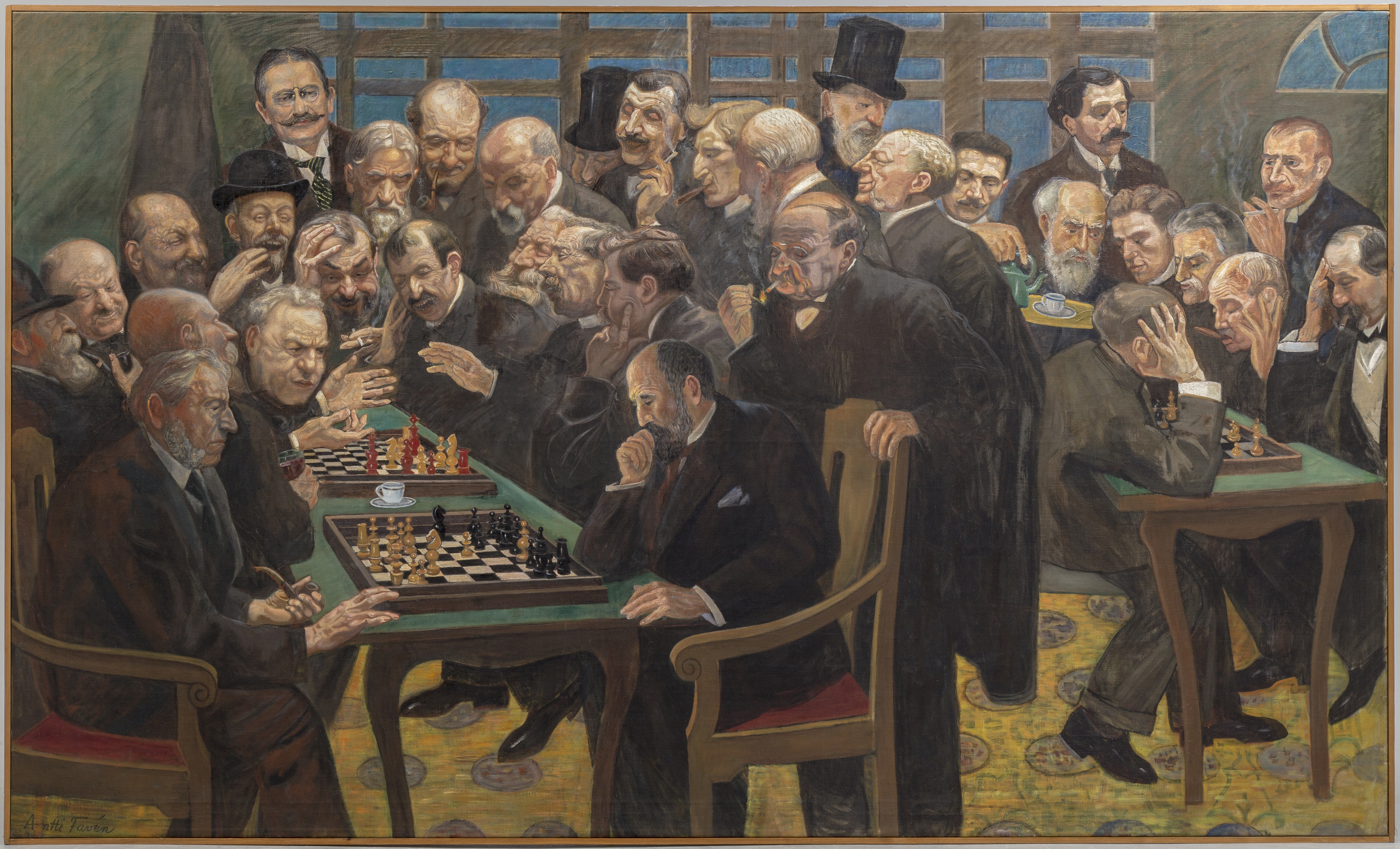
- Artist: Antti Favén (1882-1948)
- Year: 1913
- Medium: Oil on canvas
- Dimensions: 220 cm × 340 cm (87 in × 130 in)
- Location: Original in Stockholm, copy in Helsinki

The Chess Players is a painting from 1913 by the Finnish (later Swedish) painter Antti Favén (1882-1948). It was created from Favéns fascination for the chess scene in the Café de la Régence at Paris. The painting displays a fictitious scene with various well known chess players who Favén met during his stay in Paris.

== Background ==
Yrjö Antti Favén was a Finnish cosmopolitan, born in Helsinki. He lived in Paris from 1902 to 1913, where he worked in the rue de Saint-Senoch. By the end of the nineteen-thirties he settled in Sweden, where he naturalized two years before his death.

When speaking about The Chess Players, Favén mentioned amongst others his friendship with Frank Marshall and other chess players in the Café de la Régence. He also indicated that the painting would be offered to the first chess player who would win the Finnish chess championship for the third time. As Eero Böök (1910-1990) did so in 1936, it is assumed that he has received the painting at that time.

Böök has made a copy of the painting, which was anno 2016 at Shakkikoti, a chess club at Helsinki. The original appears to have eventually passed into the hands of the Swedish chess grandmaster Erik Lundin (1904-1988), who in turn has donated the painting to the Swedish Chess Union. Currently, this painting is on display in Stockholms Schacksalonger, at Stockholm.

== Description of the painting ==
The painting, originally called Les Joueurs d'échecs is unique for multiple reasons. First, its sheer size (340 x 220 cm) makes it possibly the largest chess-themed painting in the world. Second, the concept of making a group portrait of existent chess players in a fictive scene in an existing environment (they all have been in the Café de la Régence but never at the same time) was unusual. The most remarkable was perhaps the fact that it took Favén more than ten years to complete the painting.

Favén picked up this work out of fascination for the chess scene in Café de la Régence, a meeting place of internationally renowned chess players. The reputation of Café de la Régence was such that no great chess master would visit Paris without going to the Café de la Régence. Because of their status, they would play the main role in Faven's painting. The following characters can be determined with some certainty : Siegbert Tarrasch, standing in the background, left; Frank Marshall in the middle with cigar; David Janowsky with cigarette, on the right of Marshall; Amos Burn, sitting facing Marshall, with pipe; and Ossip Bernstein (facing Burn). And "around the big stars, smaller yet bright planets revolved": among the regulars of the café were all the stars of the Parisian chess community, some of whom probably are in the painting but remain thus far unidentified.

The windows and arched doorway on the background of the painting suggest that the scene is in the main room of the café. As the painting captures the romantic atmosphere of the period before the First World War, it reflects en passant the end of a carefree and calm era.

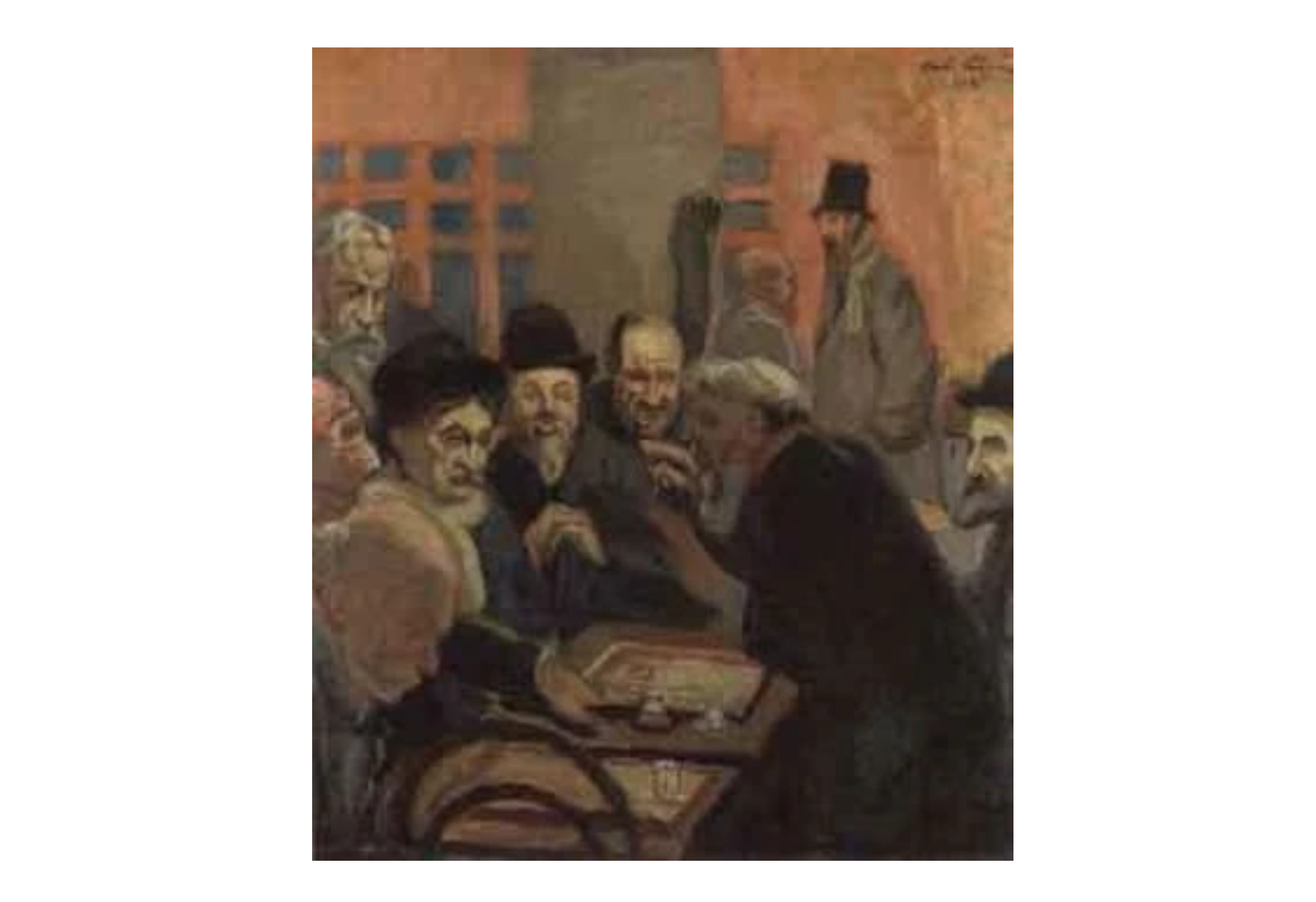
Interior of a café [Café de la Régence] with chess players, by Antti Favén (1905)

Favén made numerous sketches of the café and the chess players, which were undoubtedly the prelude to The Chess Players. In 1905, he completed another, smaller painting. At least one figure in this painting, possibly Joseph Blackburne, seems to be returning in his masterpiece of 1913.

== The mystery of the displayed chess players ==
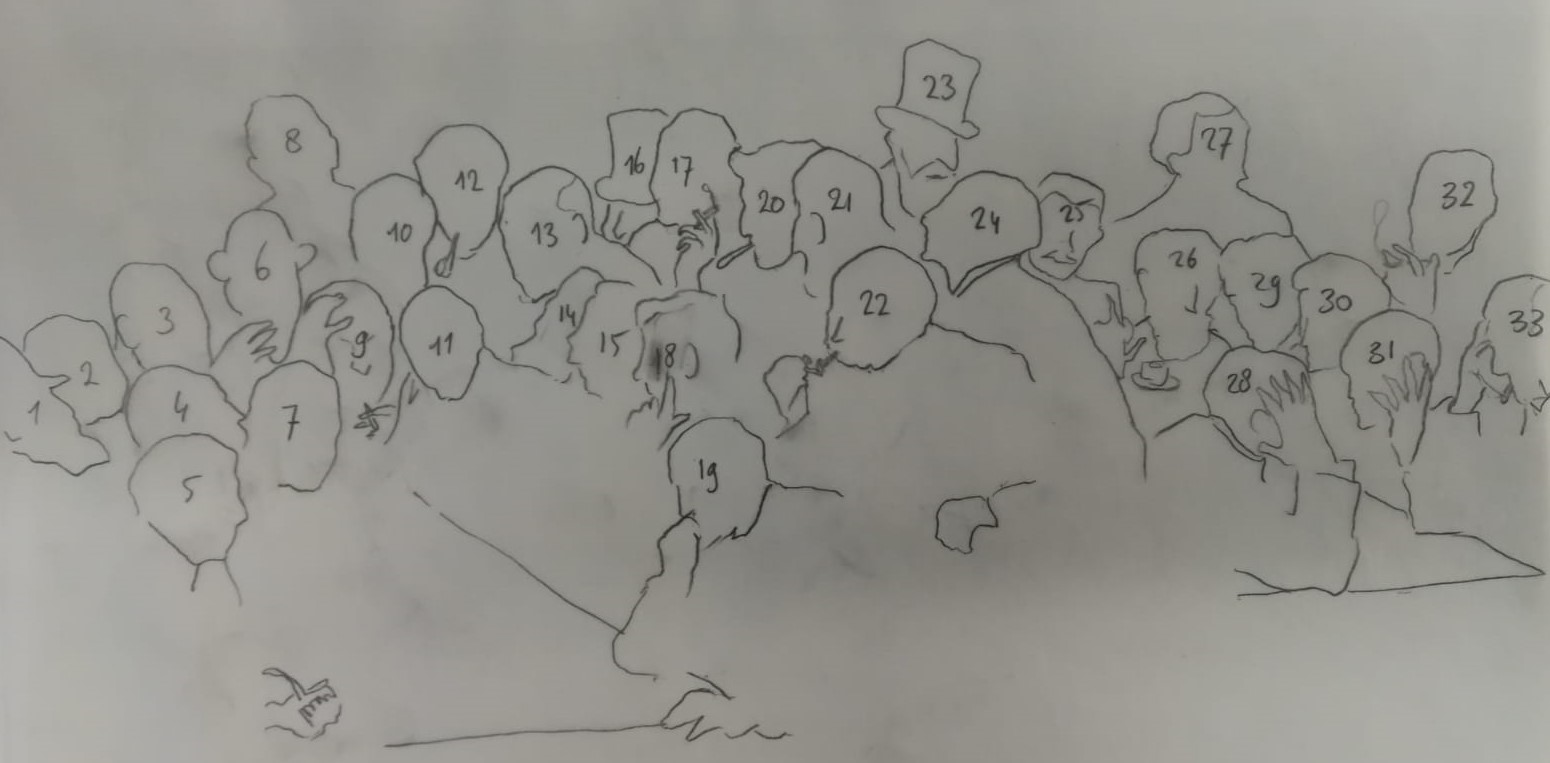
Identification key for The Chess Players

While it is known that Favén depicted the players who frequented the café during his stay in Paris, he did not leave any firm hint as to who is who, and whether there are any fictional characters included. Identification is complicated by the fact that this is a work made over a period of about ten years - a period in which people can change. It is possible that Favén did not even meet one or more of the characters and that he made some of them on the basis of photographic portraits. Tarrasch and Bernstein seem to be good examples of this possibility.

The table below lists the most plausible candidates for the different people represented.

Identified people in The Chess Players
Id. No.	Comparable image	Name	Remark
3	Taubenhaus (Drawing from 1912)	Jean Taubenhaus? (1850- 1919)	
5		Amos Burn (1848-1925)	
6	Picture from before 1924.	Joseph Blackburne? (1841-1924)	The character in the painting also seems to appear in the earlier painting
8	Picture from 1900-1920	Siegbert Tarrasch (1862-1934)	It is very likely that Faven based his depiction of Tarrasch on this photo. If the picture is from the early 1900s, then the absence of Capablanca, Rubinstein and Alekhine in the painting are explicable. On the other hand, in that case it would be surprising that Teichmann and Pillsbury seem absent.
17		David Janowski(?) (1868-1927)	
19	Picture from 1909.	Ossip Bernstein (1882-1962)	
20	Original (?) painting of Marshall	Frank Marshall (1877-1944)	
25			Waiter?
27		Emanuel Lasker? or Leo Nardus ?	Léo Nardus was a well known patron of chess. He was friends with Frank Marshall and he was the sponsor of David Janowski. He organised heavily endowed chess games in Paris.
