= Café de la Régence =

Paris centre of chess, 18th century–1916

Coordinates: 48.85990°N 2.34260°E

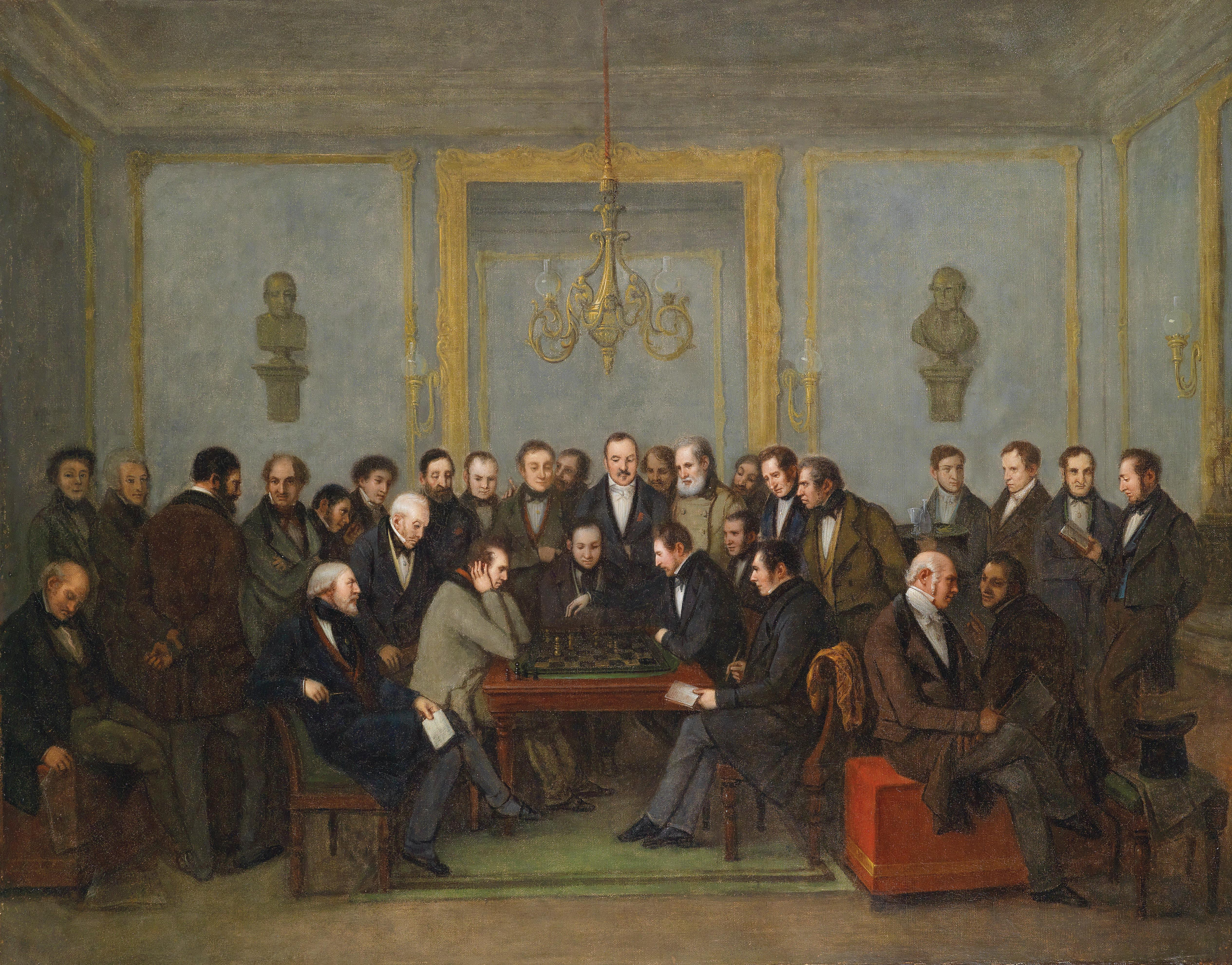
The famous chess match between Howard Staunton and Pierre Charles Fournier de Saint-Amant, on 16 December 1843, by Jean-Henri Marlet

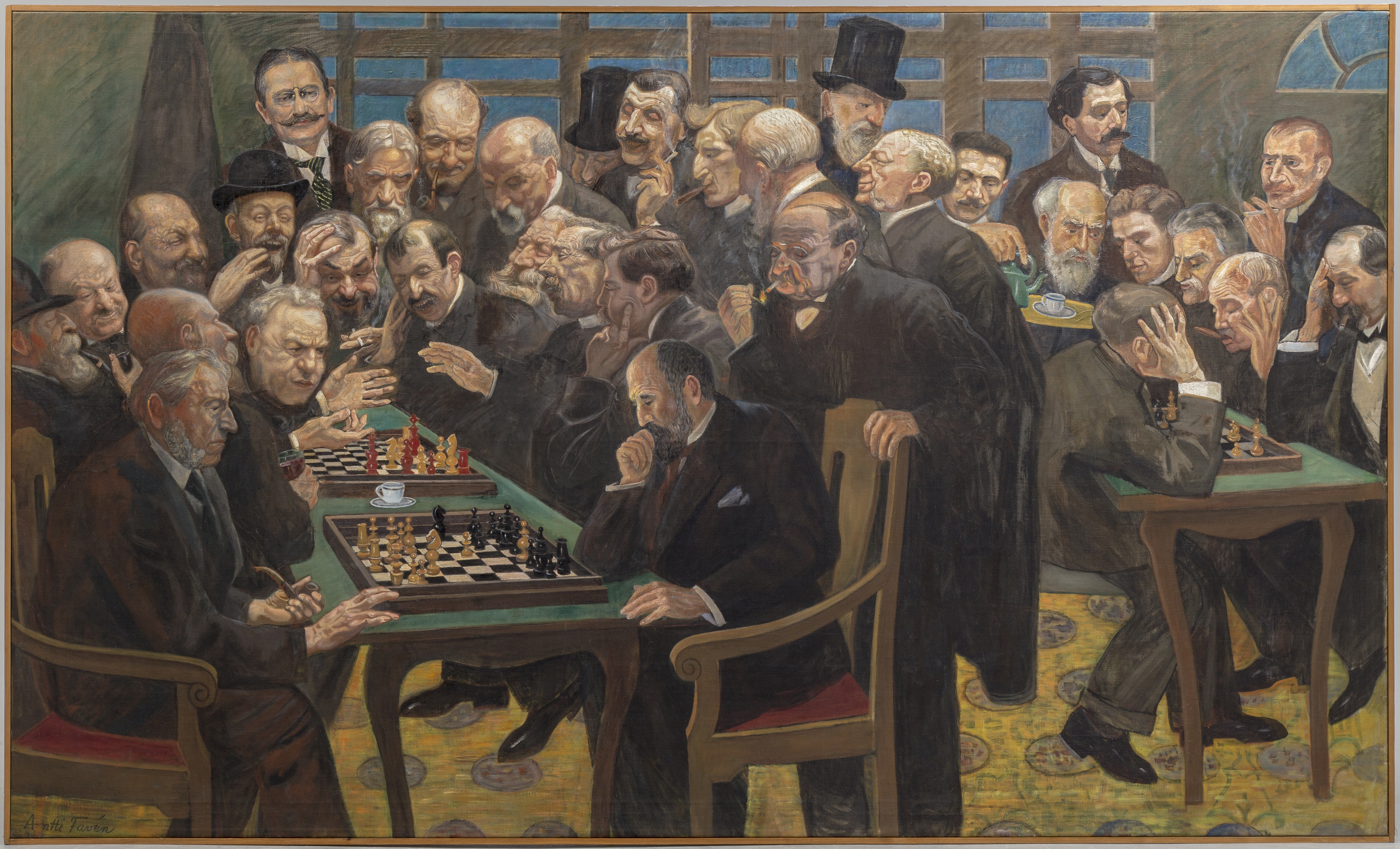
Fictional depiction of the great chess masters of the time gathering to play at the café, Antti Favén, 1902–1913

The Café de la Régence (French pronunciation: [kafe d(ə) la ʁeʒɑ̃s]) in Paris was an important European centre of chess in the 18th and 19th centuries. All important chess masters of the time played there.

The Café's masters included:

- Paul Morphy
- François-André Danican Philidor
- Alexandre Deschapelles
- Legall de Kermeur (Philidor's teacher)
- Jules Arnous de Rivière
- Adolf Anderssen
- Samuel Rosenthal
- Pierre Charles Fournier de Saint-Amant
- Lionel Kieseritzky
- Louis-Charles Mahé de La Bourdonnais

== Addresses ==
It was opened in 1681 as the Café de la Place du Palais-Royal, near the Palais-Royal, Paris. By the 18th century it was known as the Café de la Régence ("Regency Café").

- In 1852 the café moved temporarily to hôtel Dodun, 21 Rue de Richelieu.
- In 1854 the Café de la Régence moved to 161 Rue Saint-Honoré and remained there until it became a restaurant in 1910.
- The chess players moved to the café de l'Univers in 1916.
- The Office national marocain du tourisme (National Moroccan Tourist Office) took over the site in 1918.

== Additional information ==
- La Société des Amateurs was based there.
- In 1742, the celebrated French writers and philosophers Diderot and Rousseau met at this café.
- Karl Marx met Friedrich Engels for the second time at this café on 28 August 1844.
- The "great tournament of Paris 1867," won by Ignatz von Kolisch over Szymon Winawer and Wilhelm Steinitz, was played there.
- The Norwegian painter Edvard Munch visited the café on 4 May 1885, during his first visit to France to study the French impressionists.
- According to the painter Oscar Parviainen, Jean Sibelius improvised the main theme, A Prayer to God, of the finale of his Third Symphony at Café de la Régence, in January 1906.

== Bibliography ==
- Shenk, David (2006). The Immortal Game: A history of chess. Doubleday. ISBN 0-385-51010-1.
- Metzner, Paul (1998). Crescendo of the Virtuoso – via cdlib.org.
- Whyld, Ken (2006). Chess Christmas. Olomouc: Moravian Chess. S. 311-321. ISBN 80-7189-559-8.
