= Philidor =

Philidor (Filidor) or Danican Philidor was a family of musicians that served as court musicians to the French kings. The original name of the family was Danican (D'Anican) and was of Scottish origin (Duncan). Philidor was a later addition to the family name, given first to Michel the elder by Louis XIII because his oboe playing reminded the king of an Italian virtuoso oboist named Filidori. Both Michel the younger and Jean played in the Grande Écurie (literally, the Great Stable; figuratively, the Military Band) in Paris. Later members of the family were known as composers as well. One of them (François-André Danican Philidor) was also a chess master.

- Michel Danican Philidor the Elder (1580–1651)
  - Michel Danican Philidor the Younger (c. 1610–1659) was a renowned oboist and, together with Jean Hotteterre, co-invented the oboe by modifying the shawm so that the bore was narrower and the reed could be held near the end by the player's lips
  - Jean Danican Philidor (c. 1620–1679), the first whose name appears as Danican dit Philidor, father of the next generation
    - André Danican Philidor the Elder (André I, "l'aîné") (c. 1652–1730), son of Jean, composer of the Marche française (Marche royale) (1679)
      - François Danican Philidor (c. 1680–1730), son of André l'aîné, half brother of Anne
      - Anne Danican Philidor (1681–1728), son of André, founder of a series of public concerts
      - Michel Danican Philidor III (1683–1723), son of André
      - François-André Danican Philidor (André II) (1726–1795), very late son of André; opera composer (notably Tom Jones), and the strongest chess master in the 18th century. There are two chess terms named for him:
        - the Philidor Defence, an opening
        - the Philidor position, an endgame position
    - Jacques Danican Philidor (known as "le cadet", being the younger brother of André the Elder) (1657–1708), son of Jean, composer of the Marche à quatre timbales pour le Carrousel de Monseigneur (1685)
      - Pierre Danican Philidor (1681–1731), son of Jacques le cadet, also a musician
