= André Danican Philidor the Elder =

French oboist and composer

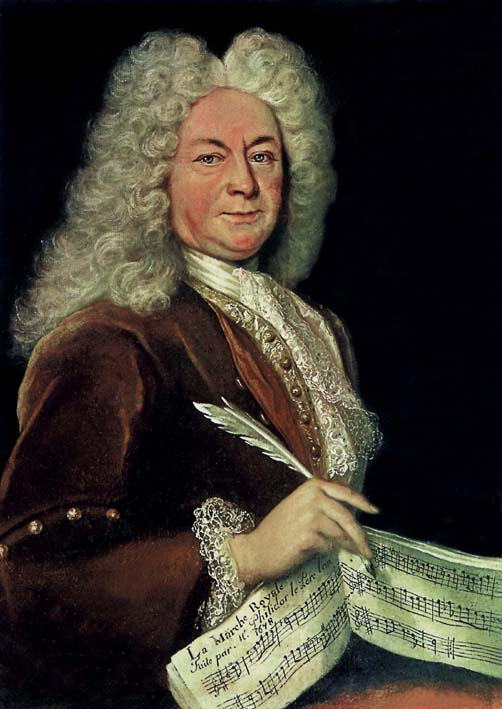
Philidor, c. 1710, showing his Marche royalle à dessus de hautbois pour la marche françoise (1678)

André Danican Philidor the elder [French: l'aîné] (c. 1652, Versailles – 11 August 1730, Dreux), a member of the Philidor^{it} family of French musicians and referred to as André Danican Philidor le père after 1709, was a music librarian, instrumentalist, and composer. He is chiefly known as the organizer and principal copyist of what is now known as the Philidor Collection of French Baroque manuscript scores.

== Career as a librarian and copyist ==
He was appointed Garde de la Bibliothèque de la Musique du Roi (Keeper of the King's Music Library) sometime before 1684, although in 1694 he claimed to have been working as music librarian for 30 years. Philidor occupied the position jointly with the violinist François Fossard (1642–1702), until Fossard's death, after which Philidor held it alone. In 1694 he and Fossard received a privilège to print music written for the court, but they only published the anthology Airs italiens (Paris, 1690–1710).

=== Philidor Collection ===
Philidor's atelier prepared manuscript copies of much of the music performed at the Palace of Versailles during the reign of Louis XIV, as well as some dating back to the reign of Henri IV. The earliest known copy is dated 1681. Besides music performed at court, he also copied music composed for other royal patrons and aristocrats. At least nine copyists were employed, including Fossard; Philidor's son-in-law, Jean-Louis Schwartzenberg (1684–1736), called Le Noble; one of three Ferriers, who were wind players at court; and his son, Anne Danican Philidor, the first of Philidor's twenty-one children.

Philidor manuscripts are now found in many private collections and libraries. Nicolas Roze inventoried 59 volumes in the library of the Paris Conservatory early in the 19th century. Now known as the Philidor Collection, over the years nearly half have been lost. Some of the lost volumes included music by members of the Philidor family. The remaining volumes were dispersed, with surviving copies located in libraries at Paris and Versailles, primarily the Bibliothèque nationale de France (which also has a number of other volumes with works copied by Philidor's atelier) and the Bibliothèque municipale de Versailles. A large number of manuscripts that Philidor prepared for the Count of Toulouse were owned by St Michael's College, Tenbury. When these were sold in 1978, a number of volumes returned to France (Paris and Versailles).

== As an instrumentalist ==
Philidor l'aîné was appointed to a position previously held by his uncle, Michel Danican, in the Cromornes et Trompettes Marines in 1659. He played oboe in the royal musketeers from 1667 to 1677; appears in librettos of Lully's ballets and operas as a player of a variety of wind and percussion instruments from 1670; played drum in the Fifres et Tambours and was a member of the 12 Grands Hautbois du Roi in 1681; was ordinaire de la musique de la chapelle from 1682; and became one of four wind players to join the Petits Violons in 1690. In 1714 he owned 33 instruments, including oboes, flutes, recorders, bassoons, oboe musette, and drums.

== As a composer ==
He probably composed occasional pieces throughout his career and began composing for the stage (opéras-ballets) after Lully's death in 1687. He may have hoped to be appointed to Lully's post of surintendant of the king's music, but in 1689 the position went to Michel-Richard de Lalande instead.

== Bibliography ==
- Anthony, James R. (1997). French Baroque Music from Beaujoyeulx to Rameau, revised and extended edition. Portland, Oregon: Amadeus Press. ISBN 9781574670219.
- Carissimi, Giacomo ([1690–1710]). Partition de Plusieurs Airs Italiens, copied by François Fossard, copied and edited by André Philidor. Paris. OCLC 764362904. Online copy at Gallica.
- Fellowes, Edmund H. (1931). "The Philidor Manuscripts: Paris, Versailles, Tenbury", Music & Letters, vol. 12, no. 2 (April), (p. 116–129). JSTOR 726641.
- Harris-Warrick, Rebecca; Marsh, Carol G. (1994). Musical Theatre at the Court of Louis XIV: 'Le mariage de la grosse Cathos'. Cambridge: Cambridge University Press. ISBN 9780521380126.
- Harris-Warrick, Rebecca (2001). "Philidor: (1) André Danican Philidor l'aîné" in The New Grove Dictionary of Music and Musicians, 2nd edition. London: Macmillan. ISBN 9781561592395 (hardcover). OCLC 419285866 (eBook). Also at Oxford Music Online (subscription required).
- Massip, Catherine (1983). "La collection musicale Toulouse-Philidor à la Bibliothèque nationale", Fontes Artis Musicae, vol. 30, no. 4 (October–December), pp. 184–207. ISSN 0015-6191. OCLC 78243220.
- Rushton, Julian (1992). "Philidor, François-André Danican", vol. 3, p. 993–995, in The New Grove Dictionary of Opera, 4 volumes, edited by Stanley Sadie. London: Macmillan. ISBN 9781561592289. Also at Oxford Music Online (subscription required).
- Sadie, Julie Anne (1990). Companion to Baroque Music. New York: Schirmer Books. ISBN 9780028722757.
- Tessier, André (1931). "Un fonds musical de la bibliothèque de Louis XIV: la collection Philidor", La Revue musicale, nos. 111–115 (April), (p. 295–302). OCLC 27878424.
- Waquet, Françoise (1980). "Philidor l'aîné, ordinaire de la Musique du Roy et garde de tous les livres de sa Bibliothèque de Musique", Revue de musicologie, vol. 66, no. 2, (p. 203–216). JSTOR 928489.
