= Leonardus Nardus =

Dutch fencer (1868–1955)

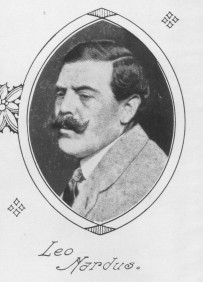

Personal information
- Nationality: Dutch
- Born: 5 May 1868 Utrecht, Netherlands
- Died: 12 June 1955 (aged 87) Tunisia

Sport
- Sport: Fencing, chess
Medal record
Men's fencing
Representing Netherlands
Olympic Games
Bronze medal – third place	1912 Stockholm	Épée, Team

Leonardus Nardus (5 May 1868 – 12 June 1955) was a Dutch fencer, impressionist painter and art collector of Jewish origin whose considerable collection was looted by the Nazis. He won a bronze medal in the team épée event at the 1912 Summer Olympics. Nardus had connections to the chess world as well.

During the 1890s and early 1900s Nardus gained an alarming reputation for his work as an art dealer in the United States, operating primarily out of New York and Philadelphia. Nardus swindled American millionaires such as Peter Arrell Brown Widener by selling for extraordinarily high prices relatively worthless pictures as landmarks of Western Art, under what Widener later described in a distraught personal letter as “gross false pretenses.” Nardus was unmasked as a swindler in 1908 by the art connoisseurs Cornelis Hofstede de Groot, Bernard Berenson, Wilhelm Valentiner and Roger Fry, but the incident was kept (mostly) quiet at the time because Nardus’s wealthy clients, including J.P. Morgan and the influential Philadelphia corporation lawyer John G. Johnson, feared embarrassment of the Emperor’s New Clothes variety. Likewise Nardus had, in any event, fled to Europe and never returned to face any consequences in America. Although tantalizing rumors have long swirled about this matter in the Dutch, French and German literature on the history of art collecting, the full story was only recently reconstructed in a scholarly article published in the UK art journal Apollo in 2007.

== Art collection and looting by Nazis ==
In addition to being a world class athlete, Nardus was an important art collector. His collection included Rembrandt, Vermeer, Hals, Rubens, Botticelli, Goya, Turner, and Vélasquez among others.

Nardus left his art collection, estimated at 150-160 artworks, with a friend for safekeeping. However, the collection was seized by the Nazis, because Nardus and the friend whose name was Arnold van Buuren were Jewish. Van Buuren, was deported along with his wife to Sobibor and perished on 23 April 1943.

Botticelli's Mary and the Child, John the Baptist and an angel, seized in 1942, was recognized as Nazi loot and restituted to Nardus' descendants in 2014.

A Rubens that had been looted from Nardus was discovered in Bonn in 2014. Most of the paintings have not been recovered.
