= Jacob Köbel =

German printer and publisher (1462–1533)

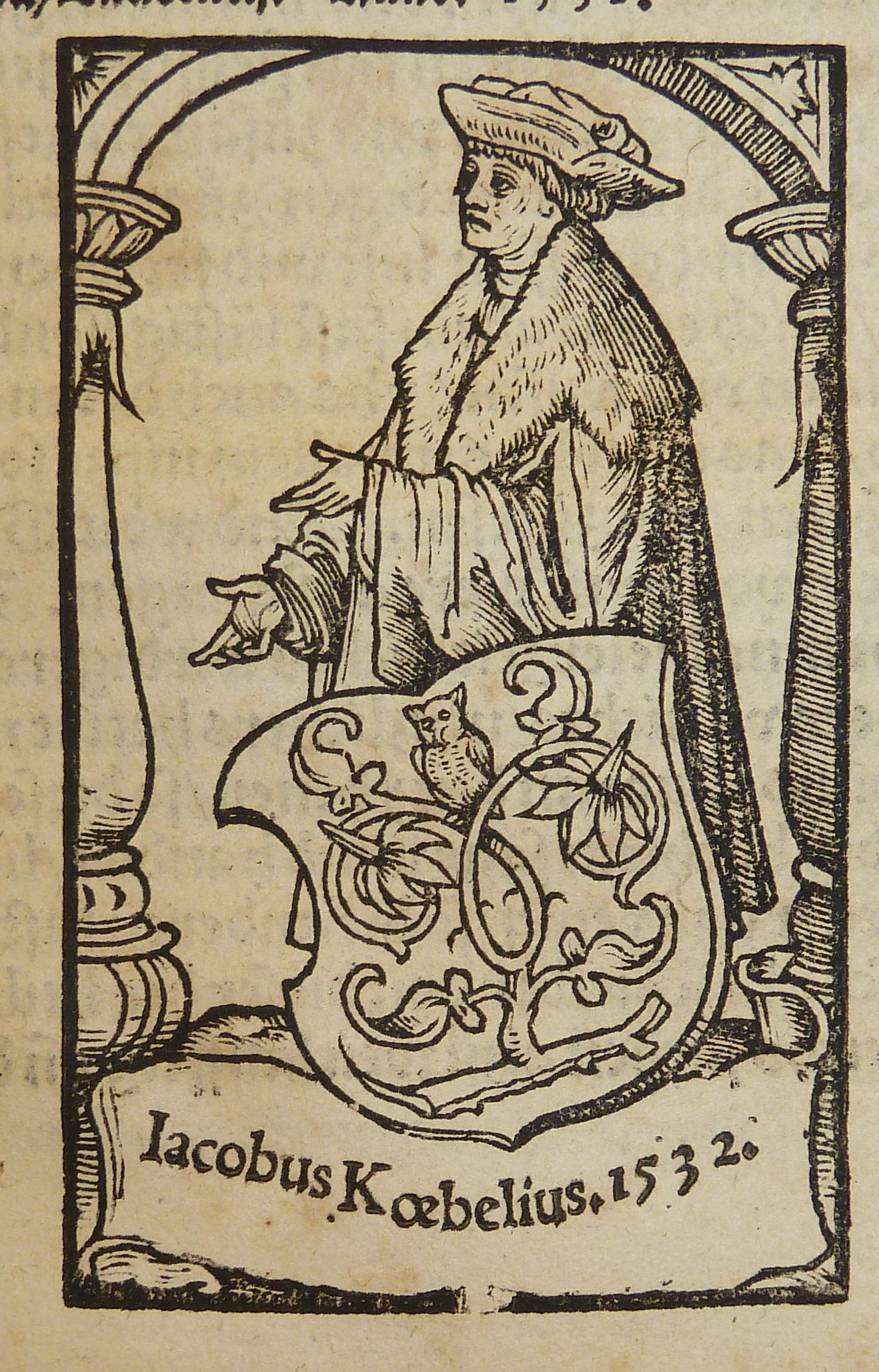
Köbel in 1532

Jacob Köbel, or Iacobus Kœbelius, (1462 – 31 January 1533) was a printer and publisher in Oppenheim.

Köbel was born in Heidelberg in 1462 and graduated in arts and law from Heidelberg University in July 1491. He appears to have then studied mathematics at Kraków, and is said to have been a fellow student of Copernicus there. He learnt the publishing trade as editor and proofreader for Heinrich Knoblochtzer in Heidelberg. On 8 May 1494, he married the daughter of Henrich zum Gelthus and settled there as secretary to the city council. He died on 31 January 1533 in Oppenheim, aged 70–71.

== Works ==
- Geometrey, 1498
- Die Merfart vn[d] erfarung nüwer Schiffung, 1509. (This work is the illustrated travelogue of Balthasar Springer, who traveled in the Portuguese colonial expedition to Goa in 1505–06.)
- Elucidatio Fabricae Ususque Astrolabii, 1513
- Astrolabii declaratio (in Latin). Paris: Guillaume Cavellat. 1552.
