= Catherine Massip =

French librarian and musicologist (born 1946)

- Born: 12 May 1946 (age 79); Paris, France
- Education: École des Chartes
- Occupations: Librarian, musicologist, archivist
- Employer(s): École des chartes, Les Arts florissants

Catherine Massip (born 12 May 1946) is a French curator of libraries and musicologist.

== Biography ==
A student of the École nationale des chartes, Massip obtained there her archivist palaeographer diploma in 1973 with a thesis entitled Les musiciens à Paris au milieu du XVIIe (1643–1661). Institutions et condition sociale. She also won first prizes at the conservatoire de Paris both in music history and musicology. She is also the holder of a State doctorate.

In 1973, she was appointed a curator at the Département de la musique de la Bibliothèque nationale de France. She spent her entire career there and headed the department from 1988 to 2012. She was appointed General curator in 1992.

She was the president of the Arts Florissants from 1996 to 2011 and secretary-general of the non-profit (association) supporting Les Arts Florissants beginning in 2012. She continues to serve as the treasurer of the Fondation Les Arts Florissants - William Christie.

At the same time, she taught modern musicology (16th to 20th centuries) as Director of Studies at the École pratique des hautes études and was a researcher at the Institute of Research on Musical Heritage in France. The Institute became the IReMus (Institut de Recherche en Musicologie) on 1 January 2014. Massip has been president of the French association of musicologists Société française de musicologie from 2005 to 2008.

== Works ==
In addition to numerous articles in scientific journals, she is the author of:

- Michel-Richard Delalande. Le Lully latin, Geneva, Papillon, 2005, 160 p. (Collection Mélophiles).
- Hector Berlioz. La Voix du romantisme, in collaboration with Cécile Reynaud, exhibition catalogue, Paris, BNF, 2003, 264 p.
- Massip, Catherine (2001). "François Lesure (1923-2001)". Revue de Musicologie. 87 (2): 517–520. JSTOR 947123.
- L’art de bien chanter : Michel Lambert (1610–1696), Paris, Société française de musicologie, 1999, 412 p.
- Catalogue des manuscrits musicaux antérieurs à 1800 conservés au département de la Musique de la Bibliothèque nationale de France, under the direction of Cécile Grand and Catherine Massip. A et B. Paris, BnF, 1999. XVII-529 p.
- Au cœur du baroque : les vingt ans des Arts Florissants, in collaboration with Marie-José Kerhoas, exhibition catalogue, Paris, Bibliothèque-Musée de l'Opéra, Sept. Dec. 1999.
- Portrait(s) de Darius Milhaud, under the direction of Myriam Chimènes and Catherine Massip, Paris, BnF, 1998, 151 p. À l'occasion de l'exposition « Les mythologies de Darius Milhaud » April–June 1999, including "Repères chronologiques", (pp. 57–91).
- André Gedalge, exhibition catalogue, in collaboration with Myriam Chimènes Paris, BnF, 1996.
- Hommage à Olivier Messiaen, exhibition catalogue, Paris, BnF, 1996.
- Portrait(s) d’Olivier Messiaen, under the direction of Catherine Massip, Paris, BnF, 1996. 175 p. including Regards sur Olivier Messiaen, textes réunis par Catherine Massip (pp. 6–37).
- Wagner, le Ring en images, in collaboration with Elisabeth Vilatte, exhibition catalogue, Paris, BNF, 1994.
- Don Juan (commissariat général), exhibition catalogue, Paris, BnF, 1991.
- Le Chant d’Euterpe, Paris, Hervas (BNP/BN), 1991, 188 p. (Iconographie musicale à la BnF).
- La France et la Russie au Siècle des Lumières, exhibition catalogue, Paris, Moscow, Leningrad (Hermitage Museum), 1987.
- Musiques anciennes (dation de Chambure), exhibition catalogue, in collaboration with François Lesure, Josiane BranRicci, Florence Gétreau (Abondance), Paris, BnF, 1980.
