= Algebraic notation (chess) =

Method to convey chess moves

Algebraic notation

Algebraic notation is the standard method of chess notation, used for recording and describing moves. It is based on a system of coordinates to uniquely identify each square on the board. It is now almost universally used by books, magazines, newspapers and software, and is the only form of notation recognized by FIDE, the international chess governing body.

An early form of algebraic notation was invented by the Syrian player Philipp Stamma in the 18th century. In the 19th century, it came into general use in German chess literature and was subsequently adopted in Russian chess literature. Descriptive notation, based on abbreviated natural language, was generally used in English language chess publications until the 1980s. Similar descriptive systems were in use in Spain and France. A few players still use descriptive notation, but it is no longer recognized by FIDE. Consequently, in FIDE sanctioned games, scoresheets recording the game in any system but algebraic may not be used as evidence in the event of a dispute (for example, whether or not a game can be claimed a draw under the threefold repetition rule).

The term "algebraic notation" may be considered a misnomer, as the system is unrelated to algebra.

== Naming the squares ==
Each square of the board is identified by a unique coordinate pair—a letter and a number—from White's point of view. The vertical columns of squares, called files, are labeled a through h from White's left (the queenside) to right (the kingside). The horizontal rows of squares, called ranks, are numbered 1 to 8 starting from White's side of the board. Thus each square has a unique identification of file letter followed by rank number. For example, the initial square of White's king is designated as "e1".

== Naming the pieces ==
Each piece type (other than pawns) is identified by an uppercase letter. English-speaking players use the letters K for king, Q for queen, R for rook, B for bishop and N for knight. Different initial letters are used by other languages. In modern chess literature, regardless of language, the initials are usually replaced by universally readable figurines.

== Notation for moves ==
In standard (or short-form) algebraic notation, each move of a piece is indicated by the piece's uppercase letter, plus the coordinates of the destination square. For example, Be5 (bishop moves to e5), Nf3 (knight moves to f3). For pawn moves, a letter indicating pawn is not used, only the destination square is given. For example, c5 (pawn moves to c5).

=== Captures ===
When a piece makes a capture, an "x" is inserted immediately before the destination square. For example, Bxe5 (bishop captures the piece on e5). When a pawn makes a capture, the file from which the pawn departed is used to identify the pawn. For example, exd5 (pawn on the e-file captures the piece on d5).

En passant captures are indicated by specifying the capturing pawn's file of departure, followed by "x", followed by the destination square (not the square of the pawn captured). Optionally the suffix "e.p." may be appended, indicating the capture was en passant; (Note: see FIDE Laws of Chess.) for example, exd6 e.p.

Sometimes a multiplication sign (×) or a colon (:) is used instead of "x", either in the middle (B:e5) or at the end (Be5:). Some publications, such as the Encyclopaedia of Chess Openings, omit any indication that a capture has been made; for example, Be5 instead of Bxe5; ed6 instead of exd6 or exd6 e.p.

When it is unambiguous to do so, a pawn capture is sometimes described by specifying only the files involved (exd or even ed). These shortened forms are sometimes called abbreviated algebraic notation or minimal algebraic notation.

=== Disambiguating moves ===
Position: c8 white rook, d8 right arrow, e8 one, g8 white rook, g7 black bishop, a6 black rook, f6 down-left arrow, e5 three, a4 two, a3 up arrow, c3 black bishop, f3 white queen, h3 white queen, a2 black rook, g2 down-left arrow, f1 four, h1 white queen

1: Rce8
2: ...R2a4
3: ...Bge5
4: Qh3f1

When two or more identical pieces can move to the same square, the moving piece is uniquely identified by specifying the piece's letter, followed by (in descending order of preference):

1. the file of departure (if they differ);
2. the rank of departure (if the files are the same but the ranks differ);
3. both the file and rank of departure (if neither file nor rank alone is sufficient to identify the piece). This occurs only when three or more pieces of the same type can move to the same square (i.e. double disambiguation).

In the diagram, both white rooks could legally move to e8, so the move of the c8-rook to e8 is disambiguated as Rce8. For the black rooks on the a-file which could both move to a4, it is necessary to provide the rank of the moving piece, i.e. R2a4. In the case of the black bishops, which can both move to e5, only the file is specified, hence Bge5, despite both the file and rank differing, since the file is sufficient to disambiguate.

In the case of the white queen on h3 moving to f1, neither the rank nor file alone are sufficient to disambiguate from the other white queens, since the others are respectively on the same file and rank as the h3-queen. As such, this move is written Qh3f1. Were one of the other queens to move to f1 instead, Qff1 for the f3-queen or Q1f1 for the h1-queen would be sufficient, as they respectively are the only white queens in file f or rank 1.

As above, an "x" can be inserted to indicate a capture; for example, if the final case were a capture, it would be written as Qh3xf1.

=== Pawn promotion ===
When a pawn promotes, the piece promoted to is indicated at the end. FIDE's preferred style is simply to give the piece initial without any gaps or punctuation. For example, a pawn on e7 promoting to a queen on e8 would be rendered as e8Q. It may may also be variously rendered as e8=Q, e8(Q), e8/Q etc.

=== Castling ===
Castling is indicated by the special notations 0-0 (for kingside castling) and 0-0-0 (queenside castling). O-O and O-O-O (letter O rather than digit 0) are also commonly used. (Note: The main differences from standard Algebraic are that there is both a dot and a space after each move number, and an upper case "O" is used, instead of a zero, in the notation for castling. Presumably these were initially just one individual's personal foible (or error) in the early days of chess on the Internet, but the standard is now established. — Burgess (1997))

=== Check ===
A move that places the opponent's king in check usually has the symbol "+" appended. Alternatively, sometimes a dagger (†) or the abbreviation "ch" is used. Some publications indicate a discovered check with an abbreviation such as "dis ch" or with a specific symbol. Double check is usually indicated the same as check, but is sometimes represented specifically as "dbl ch" or "++", particularly in older chess literature. Some publications such as ECO omit any indication of check.

=== Checkmate ===
Checkmate at the completion of moves is represented by the symbol "#" in standard FIDE notation and PGN. The word mate is commonly used instead; occasionally a double dagger (‡) or a double plus sign (++) is used, although the double plus sign is also used to represent double check (a king under attack by two enemy pieces simultaneously). In the macOS chess application, checkmate is represented by the not equal sign (≠). In Russian and ex-USSR publications, where captures are indicated by ":", checkmate can also be represented by "X" or "x".

=== Draw offer ===
FIDE specifies draw offers to be recorded by an equals sign with parentheses "(=)" after the move on the score sheet. (Note: Article 9.1.2.2 in FIDE Laws of Chess) This is not usually included in published game scores.

=== End of game ===
The notation 1–0 at the completion of moves indicates that White won, 0–1 indicates that Black won and ½–½ indicates a draw. In case of forfeit, the scores 0–0, ½–0 and 0–½ are also possible. In case of loss by default, results are +/−, −/+ or −/−.

Except in the case of checkmate, there is no information in the notation regarding the circumstance of the final result. Merely 1–0 or 0–1 is written whether a player resigned, lost due to time control or forfeited; in the case of a draw, ½–½ is written whether the draw was decided by mutual agreement, repetition, stalemate, 50-move rule or dead position. Sometimes direct information is given by words such as "resigns", "draw agreed" etc., but this is not considered part of the notation, rather a part of the narrative text.

== Variants of algebraic notation ==
Besides standard (or short form) algebraic notation already described, several similar systems have been used.

=== Long algebraic notation ===
In long algebraic notation, also known as fully expanded algebraic notation, both the starting and ending squares are specified, for example: e2e4. Sometimes these are separated by a hyphen, e.g. Nb1-c3, while captures are indicated by an "x", e.g. Rd3xd7. This was the original system used in early chess literature such as the Handbuch; however, it takes more space than short-form algebraic notation and is no longer commonly used in print. It has the advantage of clarity, however, and some players prefer it for recording their games on a scoresheet, as is required in classical FIDE rated games.

A form of long algebraic notation (without piece names) is also used by the Universal Chess Interface (UCI) standard, which is a common way for graphical chess programs to communicate with chess engines, e.g. e2e4, e1g1 (castling), e7e8q (promotion).

=== Figurine algebraic notation ===
In modern chess literature, the language-specific letters are usually replaced by universally recognizable piece symbols; for example, ♞c6 in place of Nc6. This style is known as figurine algebraic notation. This style was pioneered by Chess Informant, and is now standard in chess literature. The Unicode Miscellaneous Symbols set includes all the symbols necessary for figurine algebraic notation.

=== PGN ===
Portable Game Notation (PGN) is a text-based file format for storing chess games, which uses standard English algebraic notation and a small amount of markup. PGN can be processed by almost all chess software, as well as being easily readable by humans. For example, the Game of the Century could be represented in PGN as follows:

[Event "Third Rosenwald Trophy"]
[Site "New York, NY USA"]
[Date "1956.10.17"]
[EventDate "1956.10.07"]
[Round "8"]
[Result "0-1"]
[White "Donald Byrne"]
[Black "Robert James Fischer"]
[ECO "D92"]
[WhiteElo "?"]
[BlackElo "?"]
[PlyCount "82"]
  
1. Nf3 Nf6 2. c4 g6 3. Nc3 Bg7 4. d4 O-O 5. Bf4 d5 6. Qb3 dxc4 7. Qxc4
8. e4 Nbd7 9. Rd1 Nb6 10. Qc5 Bg4 11. Bg5 Na4 12. Qa3 Nxc3 13. bxc3 Nxe4
14. Bxe7 Qb6 15. Bc4 Nxc3 16. Bc5 Rfe8+ 17. Kf1 Be6 18. Bxb6 Bxc4+ 19. Kg1
Ne2+ 20. Kf1 Nxd4+ 21. Kg1 Ne2+ 22. Kf1 Nc3+ 23. Kg1 axb6 24. Qb4 Ra4
25. Qxb6 Nxd1 26. h3 Rxa2 27. Kh2 Nxf2 28. Re1 Rxe1 29. Qd8+ Bf8 30. Nxe1
Bd5 31. Nf3 Ne4 32. Qb8 b5 33. h4 h5 34. Ne5 Kg7 35. Kg1 Bc5+ 36. Kf1 Ng3+
37. Ke1 Bb4+ 38. Kd1 Bb3+ 39. Kc1 Ne2+ 40. Kb1 Nc3+ 41. Kc1 Rc2# 0-1

== Formatting ==
Position: a8 black rook, c8 black bishop, d8 black queen, e8 black king, f8 black bishop, g8 black knight, h8 black rook, b7 black pawn, c7 black pawn, d7 black pawn, f7 black pawn, g7 black pawn, h7 black pawn, a6 black pawn, c6 black knight, b5 white bishop, e5 black pawn, e4 white pawn, f3 white knight, a2 white pawn, b2 white pawn, c2 white pawn, d2 white pawn, f2 white pawn, g2 white pawn, h2 white pawn, a1 white rook, b1 white knight, c1 white bishop, d1 white queen, e1 white king, h1 white rook

Position after 1.e4 e5 2.Nf3 Nc6 3.Bb5 a6

A game or series of moves is generally written in one of two ways; in two columns, as White/Black pairs, preceded by the move number and a period:

1. e4 e5
2. Nf3 Nc6
3. Bb5 a6

or horizontally:

1. e4 e5 2. Nf3 Nc6 3. Bb5 a6

Moves may be interspersed with commentary, called annotations. When the game score resumes with a Black move, an ellipsis (...) fills the position of the White move, for example:

1. e4 e5 2. Nf3

White attacks the black e-pawn.

2... Nc6

Black defends and develops simultaneously.

3. Bb5

White plays the Ruy Lopez.

3... a6

Black elects Morphy's Defense.

== Annotation symbols ==
Though not technically a part of algebraic notation, the following are some symbols commonly used by annotators, for example in publications Chess Informant and Encyclopaedia of Chess Openings, to give editorial comment on a move or position.

The symbol chosen is appended to the end of the move notation, for example, in the Soller Gambit: 1.d4 e5?! 2.dxe5 f6 3.e4! Nc6 4.Bc4+/−.

=== Moves ===
Symbol	Meaning
!!	A brilliant—and usually surprising—move
!	A very good move
!?	An interesting move that may not be the best
?!	A dubious move that is not easily refutable
?	A bad move; a mistake
??	A blunder (i.e. critically bad mistake)
⌓	A better move than the one played
□	A forced move; the only reasonable move, or the only move available
TN or N	A theoretical novelty

=== Positions ===
Symbol	Meaning
=	Both players have equal chances.
+/= or ⩲	White has a slight plus.
=/+ or ⩱	Black has a slight plus.
+/− or ±	White has a clear plus.
−/+ or ∓	Black has a clear plus.
+−	White has a winning advantage.
−+	Black has a winning advantage.
∞	It is unclear whether either side has an advantage; a "toss-up".
=/∞ or ⯹	Whoever is down in material has compensation for it.

== History ==
Descriptive notation was usual in the Middle Ages in Europe. A form of algebraic chess notation that seems to have been borrowed from Muslim chess, however, appeared in Europe in a 12th-century manuscript referred to as "MS. Paris Fr. 1173 (PP.)". The files run from a to h, just as they do in the current standard algebraic notation. The ranks, however, are also designated by letters, with the exception of the 8th rank which is distinct because it has no letter. The ranks are lettered in reverse – from the 7th to the 1st: k, l, m, n, o, p, q.

Another system of notation using only letters appears in a book of Mediaeval chess, Rechenmeister Jacob Köbel's Schachzabel Spiel of 1520.

Algebraic notation exists in various forms and languages and is based on a system developed by Philipp Stamma in the 1730s. Stamma used the modern names of the squares (and may have been the first to number the ranks), but he used p for pawn moves and the capital original file of a piece (A through H) instead of the initial letter of the piece name as used now. Piece letters were introduced in the 1780s by Moses Hirschel, and Johann Allgaier with Aaron Alexandre developed the modern castling notation in the 1810s.

Algebraic notation was described in 1847 by Howard Staunton in his book The Chess-Player's Handbook. Staunton credits the idea to German authors, and in particular to "Alexandre, Jaenisch and the Handbuch [des Schachspiels]". While algebraic notation has been used in German and Russian chess literature since the 19th century, the Anglosphere was slow to adopt it, using descriptive notation for much of the 20th century. Beginning in the 1970s, algebraic notation gradually became more common in English language publications, and by 1980 it had become the prevalent notation. In 1981, FIDE stopped recognizing descriptive notation, and algebraic notation became the accepted international standard.

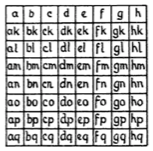
Chess diagram found in a French manuscript (1173)

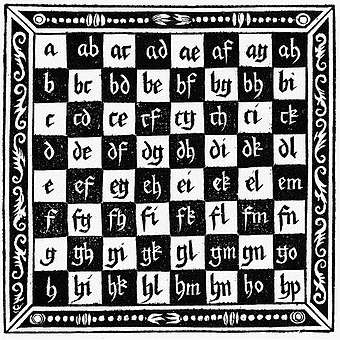
Chess diagram from Jacob Köbel's German book about Mediaeval chess, Schachzabel Spiel (1520)

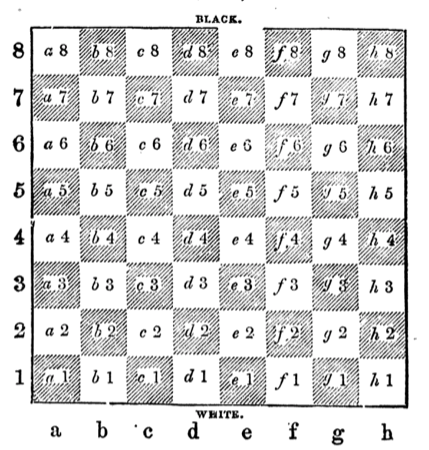
Chess diagram showing algebraic notation in Howard Staunton's The Chess-Player's Handbook (1866)

== Piece names in various languages ==
The table contains names for all the pieces as well as the words for chess, check and checkmate in several languages. Several languages use the Arabic loanword alfil for the piece called bishop in English; in this context it is a chess-specific term which no longer has its original meaning of "elephant".

Overview of chess piece names
Language	King	Queen	Rook	Bishop	Knight	Pawn	Chess	Check	Checkmate/Mate
figure	♔ ♚	♕ ♛	♖ ♜	♗ ♝	♘ ♞	♙ ♟	n/a	+ or †	# or ++ or ‡
Adyghe	П пачъыхь / пщы (pachyh / pshy) king / prince	Г гуащэ / озир (gwashe / wezir) lady / vizier	Къ къалэ / къошъожъый (qale / qoshwozhyy) fortress / boat	Пл пыл (pyl) elephant	Ш шы (shy) horse	(Лъ) лъэс / дзэ (lhes / dze) foot soldier / army	сэнтӀыращ / шахмат (sent'yrash / shakhmat)	шах (shakh)	мат (mat)
Afrikaans	K Koning king	D Dame lady	T Toring tower	L Loper runner	R Ruiter rider	(P) Pion	Skaak	Skaak	Skaakmat
Albanian	M Mbreti king	D Dama / Mbretëresha lady / queen	T Torra tower	F Fili / Oficeri elephant / officer	K Kali horse	(U) Ushtari soldier	Shahu	Shah	Shah mat
Arabic	م مَلِك (malik) king	و وزير (wazïr) vizier	ر رخ / طابية (rukhkh / ṭābiya) fortress / castle	ف فيل (fīl) elephant	ح حصان (ħiṣān) horse	ب بيدق / عسكري (baidaq / `askarī) pawn / soldier	شطرنج (shaṭranj)	كِش مَلِك (kish malik)	كِش مات (kish māt)
Azerbaijani	Ş Şah shah	V Vəzir vizier	T Top cannon	F Fil elephant	A At horse	P Piyada foot soldier	Şahmat	şah shah	mat mat
Armenian	Ա Արքա (Ark῾a) king	Թ Թագուհի (T῾agowhi) queen	Ն Նավակ (Navak) ship	Փ Փիղ (P῾ił) elephant	Ձ Ձի (Dzi) horse	Զ Զինվոր (Zinvor) soldier	Շախմատ (Šaxmat); Ճատրակ (Čatrak)	Շախ (Šax)	Մատ (Mat)
Basque	E Erregea king	D Dama lady	G Gaztelua castle	A Alfila elephant	Z Zalduna knight	(P) Peoia pawn	Xake	Xake	Xake mate
Belarusian (Taraškievica)	К кароль king	Вз візыр vizier	Лд ладзьдзя boat	А афіцэр officer	В вершнік rider	(Л) латнік pawn	Шахматы	Шах	Мат
Bengali	R রাজা (rājā); King	M মন্ত্রী (montri); Minister	N নৌকা (noukā); Boat	H গজ / হাতি (gôj / hāti) elephant	G ঘোড়া (ghoṛā); Horse	B বোড়ে / সৈন্য (boṛe / śoinno); Walker / Troop	দাবা (dābā)	কিস্তি (kisti); Check	কিস্তিমাত (kistimāt); Checkmate
Bulgarian	Ц цар tsar	Д дама / царица lady / queen	Т топ cannon	О офицер officer	К кон horse	(П) пешка foot soldier	Шахмат / Шах	Шах	(Шах и) мат
Catalan	R rei	D dama / reina lady / queen	T torre tower	A alfil elephant	C cavall horse	(P) peó	Escacs	Escac / Xec	Escac i mat
Chinese	K 王 (wáng) king / 王	Q 后 (hòu) queen / 后	R 車 (jū) chariot / 车	B 象 (xiàng) elephant / 象	N 馬 (mǎ) horse / 马	(P) 兵 (bīng) soldier / 兵	國際象棋 (guójì xiàngqí) international chess / 西洋棋 (xīyáng qí) western chess	將軍 (jiāngjūn)	將死 (jiāng sǐ)
Czech	K král king	D dáma lady	V věž tower	S střelec shooter	J jezdec rider	(P) pěšec foot soldier	Šachy	Šach	Mat
Danish	K konge king	D dronning queen	T tårn tower	L løber runner	S springer jumper	(B) bonde peasant	Skak	Skak	Skakmat
Dutch	K koning king	D dame / koningin lady / queen	T toren / kasteel tower / castle	L loper / raadsheer runner / counsellor	P paard horse	(pi) pion	Schaken	Schaak	Mat / Schaakmat
English	K king	Q queen	R rook, castle	B bishop	N knight	(P) pawn	Chess	Check	Checkmate / Mate
Esperanto	R reĝo king	D damo lady	T turo tower	K kuriero courier	Ĉ ĉevalo horse	(P) peono	Ŝako	Ŝak	Ŝakmato
Estonian	K kuningas king	L lipp flag	V vanker chariot / carriage	O oda spear	R ratsu riding horse	(E) ettur forwarder	Male after malev	Tuli / Šahh fire	Matt
Finnish	K kuningas king	D daami / kuningatar lady / queen	T torni tower	L lähetti messenger	R ratsu ride	(S) sotilas soldier	Shakki	Shakki	Matti / Shakkimatti
French	R roi king	D dame / reine lady / queen	T tour tower	F fou jester	C cavalier / cheval rider / horse	(P) pion	Échecs	Échec	Échec et mat
Galician	R rei king	D dama / raíña lady / queen	T torre tower	B bispo bishop	C cabalo horse	(P) peón foot soldier	Xadrez	Xaque	Xaque mate
Georgian	მფ მეფე (mep'e) king	ლ ლაზიერი (lazieri) queen	ე ეტლი (etli) chariot	კ კუ (ku) tortoise	მ მხედარი (mkhedari) rider	პ პაიკი (paiki) pawn	ჭადრაკი (Čadraki)	ქიში (K'ishi)	შამათი (Shamat'i)
German	K König king	D Dame lady / queen	T Turm tower	L Läufer runner	S Springer jumper	(B) Bauer peasant / farmer	Schach	Schach	Matt / Schachmatt
Greek	Ρ βασιλιάς (vasiliás) king	Β βασίλισσα (vasílissa) queen	Π πύργος (pýrgos) tower	Α αξιωματικός (axiomatikós) officer	Ι ίππος (íppos) horse	(Σ) πιόνι (pióni) pawn	Σκάκι (Skáki)	Σαχ (Sach) / Ρουά (Rouá)	Mατ (Mat)
Hindi	R राजा (rājā) king	V वज़ीर / रानी (vazīr / rānī) vizier / queen	H हाथी (hāthī) elephant	O ऊँट (ūṁṭ) camel	G घोड़ा (ghoṛā) horse	(P) प्यादा (pyādā) infantryman	शतरंज (śatrañj)	शह (Shah)	शहमात (Shahmāt)
Hebrew	מ מלך (Melekh) king	מה מלכה (Malka) queen	צ צריח (Tsari'aẖ) tower	ר רץ (Rats) runner Medieval: פיל (Pil), elephant	פ פרש (Parash) horseman	רגלי (Ragli) foot soldier	שחמט (Shaẖmat)	שח (Shaẖ)	מט (Mat)
Hausa	S sarki king	Q sarauniya queen	R sansanin fortress	G giwa elephant	J jarumi mounted warrior	(P) soja soldier	ces	ceki	ceki mat
Hungarian	K király king	V vezér / királynő leader / queen	B bástya bastion	F futó runner	H huszár / ló hussar / horse	(Gy) gyalog / paraszt footman / peasant	Sakk	Sakk	Matt / Sakk-matt
Icelandic	K kóngur king	D drottning queen	H hrókur rook	B biskup bishop	R riddari knight	(P) peð pawn	Skák	Skák	Skák og mát
Ido	R rejo king	D damo lady	T turmo tower	E episkopo bishop	K kavalo horse	(P) piono	Shakoludo	Shako	Shakmato
Indonesian	R raja king	M menteri minister / vizier	B benteng castle / fortress	G gajah elephant	K kuda horse	(P) pion	Catur	Sekak / Ster	Sekakmat
Interslavic	K kralj king	C carica / dama empress / lady	Z zamok / věža castle / tower	L lovec hunter	J jezdec / konj rider / horse	(P) pěšak infantryman	Šahy	Šah	Mat
Irish	R rí king	B banríon queen	C caiseal bulwark	E easpag bishop	D ridire knight	(F) fichillín / ceithearnach little chess piece / kern	Ficheall	Sáinn	Marbhsháinn
Italian	R re king	D donna / regina lady / queen	T torre tower	A alfiere ensign	C cavallo horse	(P) pedone foot soldier	Scacchi	Scacco	Scacco matto
Japanese	K キング (kingu) / 王 王将 (ōshō)	Q クイーン (kuīn) / 奔 奔王 (hon'ō)	R ルーク (rūku) / 飛 飛車 (hisha)	B ビショップ (bishoppu) / 角 角行 (kakugyō) bishop / angle-mover	N ナイト (naito) / 桂 八方桂 (happōkei)	(P) ポーン (pōn) / 歩 歩兵 (fuhyō)	チェス (chesu) / 西洋将棋 (seiyō shōgi)	王手 (ōte) / チェック (chekku)	詰み (tsumi) / チェックメイト (chekkumeito)
Javanese	R raja king	Q ratu / perdhana mentri queen / prime minister	B bèntèng fortress	M mentri minister	K jaran horse	(P) pion	sekak		
Kannada	ರಾ ರಾಜ (raaja) king	ಮ ಮಂತ್ರಿ (mantri) minister	ರ ರಥ (ratha) chariot	ಆ ಆನೆ (aane) elephant	ಕು ಕುದುರೆ (kudure) horse	ಪಾ ಪದಾತಿ (padaati) foot soldier	ಚದುರಂಗ (caduraṅga)		
Kabardian	П пащтыхь / пщы (pashtyh / pshy) king / prince	Г гуащэ / уэзир (gwashe / wezir) lady / vizier	Къ къалэ / кхъуафэжьей (qale / qhwafezhey) fortress / boat	Пл пыл (pyl) elephant	Ш шы (shy) horse	(Лъ) лъэс / дзэ (lhes / dze) foot soldier / army	шахмат (shakhmat)	шах (shakh)	мат (mat)
Kazakh	Кр патша (patşa) king	У уәзір (uäzır) vizier	Т тура (tura) tower	П піл (pıl) elephant	А ат (at) horse	(П) пешка (peşka) / (С) сарбаз (sarbaz) foot soldier / warrior	шахмат (şahmat)	шах (şah)	мат (mat)
Korean	K 킹 (king)	Q 퀸 (kwin)	R 룩 (rug)	B 비숍 (bi syob)	N 나이트 (na i teu)	(P) 폰 (pon)	체스 (che seu)	체크 (che keu)	체크메이트 (che keu me i teu)
Latin	R rex king	D domina queen	T turris / elephas tower / elephant	S signifer / cursor / stultus / alphinus standard-bearer / messenger / fool	E eques knight	(P) pedes / pedo foot soldier	Scacci	Scaccus	Mattus
Latvian	K karalis king	D dāma lady	T tornis tower	L laidnis	Z zirgs horse	(B) bandinieks peasant	Šahs	Šahs	Šahs un mats
Lithuanian	K karalius king	V valdovė queen	B bokštas tower	R rikis Lithuanian military commander	Ž žirgas horse	(P) pėstininkas pawn	Šachmatai	Šach	Matas
Luxembourgish	K Kinnek king	D Damm lady	T Tuerm tower	L Leefer runner	S Sprénger jumper	(B) Bauer farmer	Schach	Schach	Matt / Schachmatt
Macedonian	K крал king	D кралица / дама queen / lady	T топ cannon	L ловец hunter	S коњ / скокач horse / jumper	P пешак / пион infantryman / pawn	шах	шах	мат
Malayalam	K രാജാവ് (raajavu) king	Q മന്ത്രി (manthri) minister	R തേര് (therú) chariot	B ആന (aana) elephant	N/Kt കുതിര (kuthira) horse	(P) കാലാള്‍ / പടയാളി (kaalal / padayaali) foot soldier	ചതുരംഗം (chathurangam)	ചെക്ക്	ചെക്ക് മേറ്റ്
Marathi	R राजा (rājā) king	V वजीर (vajīr) vizier	H हत्ती (hātti) elephant	O उंट (Unṭ) camel	G घोडा (ghoḍā) horse	(P) प्यादे (pyāde) foot soldier	बुद्धिबळ (buddhibal)	शह (shah)	शहमात (shahmāt)
Mongolian	Н ноён noyan	Б бэрс (bers)	т тэрэг (tereg) chariot	Т тэмээ (temee) camel	М морь (mor) horse	(Х) хүү (hüü) boy	Шатар	шаг / дуг / цод	мад
Norwegian Bokmål	K konge king	D dronning queen	T tårn tower	L løper runner	S springer jumper	(B) bonde peasant	Sjakk	Sjakk	Sjakkmatt
Norwegian Nynorsk	K konge king	D dronning queen	T tårn tower	L løpar runner	S springar jumper	(B) bonde peasant	Sjakk	Sjakk	Sjakkmatt
Odia	K ରଜା (rôja) king	Q ରାଣୀ (raṇi) queen	R ଡଙ୍ଗା (ḍôṅga) boat	B ହାତୀ (hati) elephant	N ଘୋଡ଼ା (ghoṛa) horse	P ସୈନିକ (sôinikô) soldier	ଚେସ୍/ଶତରଞ୍ଜ (chess/śôtôrôñjô)	ଚେକ୍ (check)	ଚେକମେଟ୍ (checkmate)
Oromo	M Mootii	Mt Mootittii	G Gidaara, masaraa	A abuunii	N namkabajaa	Cheezii	Mirkaneeffannaa	Waayila / Mate	
Persian	ش شاه king	و وزیر vizier / minister	ق/ر قلعه/رخ castle	ف فیل elephant	ا اسب horse	س/پ سرباز/پیاده soldier	شطرنج (shatranj)	کیش (kish)	مات (mat)
Polish	K król king	H hetman / królowa general (hist.) / queen	W wieża tower	G goniec / laufer courier / (ger. derived)	S skoczek / koń jumper / horse	(P) pion / pionek pawn	Szachy	szach	mat / szach-mat
Portuguese	R rei king	D dama / rainha lady / queen	T torre tower	B bispo bishop	C cavalo horse	(P) peão foot soldier	Xadrez	Xeque	Xeque-mate
Romanian	R rege king	D damă / regină lady / queen	T turn / tură tower	N nebun fool	C cal horse	(P) pion	Șah	Șah	Mat / Șah mat
Russian	Кр король (korol') king	Ф ферзь / королева (ferz' / koroleva) vizier / queen	Л ладья (ladya) boat	С слон (slon) elephant	К конь (kon') horse	(П) пешка (peshka)	шахматы (shakhmaty)	шах (shakh)	мат (mat)
Scottish Gaelic	R righ king	B bànrigh queen	T tùr tower	E easbaig bishop	D ridir knight	(P) pàn pawn	feòirne	casg	tul-chasg
Serbo-Croatian	K kralj (К краљ) king	D kraljica / dama (Д краљицa / дама) queen / lady	T top / kula (Т топ / кула) cannon / tower	L lovac / strijelac / laufer (Л ловац / стрелац / лауфер) hunter / archer / runner	S skakač / konj (С скaкaч / коњ) jumper / horse	(P) pješak / pion / pijun ((П) пешак / пион / пијун) footman / pawn	Šah (Шах)	Šah (Шах)	Mat (Мат)
Northern Sotho	K Kgoši	Kg Kgošigadi	N Ntlosebô / Moshate	Mp Mopišopo bishop	M Mogale	S Seitšhireletšo	Tšhêšê	Check	Checkmate
Sicilian	R re king	D riggina queen	T turru tower	A alferu elephant	S scecc[h]u donkey	(P) pidinu foot soldier	Scacchi		
Slovak	K kráľ king	D dáma lady	V veža tower	S strelec shooter	J jazdec rider	(P) pešiak infantryman / pawn	Šach	Šach	Mat / Šachmat
Slovene	K kralj king	D dama lady	T trdnjava castle	L lovec hunter	S skakač jumper	(P) kmet farmer	Šah	Šah	Mat / Šahmat
Spanish	R rey king	D dama / reina lady / queen	T torre tower	A alfil elephant	C caballo horse	(P) peón foot soldier	Ajedrez	Jaque	Jaque mate
Swedish	K kung king	D dam / drottning lady / queen	T torn tower	L löpare runner	H springare / riddare horse/knight	(B) bonde peasant	Schack	Schack	Schack matt
Tamil	K அரசன் (arasaṉ) king	Q அரசி (araci) queen	R கோட்டை (kōṭṭai) castle	B அமைச்சர் / மந்திரி (amaicchar / manthiri) minister	N/Kt குதிரை (kutirai) horse	(P) காலாள் / சிப்பாய் (kālāḷ / cippāy) foot soldier / sepoy	சதுரங்கம் (sathurankam)	முற்றுகை (muṟṟukai)	இறுதி முற்றுகை (iṟuti muṟṟukai)
Telugu	రాజు (rāju) king	మంత్రి (maṃtri) minister	ఏనుగు (ēnugu) elephant	శకటు (śakaţu)	గుర్రం (gurraṃ) horse	బంటు (baṃţu) soldier	చదరంగం (cadaraṃgaṃ)	దాడి (dāḍi)	కట్టు (kaţţu)
Thai	ข ขุน (khun) king	ต เม็ด / ตรี / มนตรี (met / tri / montri) counselor	ร เรือ (ruea) ship	ค โคน (khon)	ม ม้า (ma) horse	(บ) เบี้ย (bia) menial	หมากรุก (makruk)	รุก (ruk)	จน (chon)
Turkish	Ş şah shah	V vezir vizier	K kale castle	F fil elephant	A at horse	(P) piyon	Satranç	Şah	Mat
Ukrainian	Kр король (korol) king	Ф ферзь (ferz) vizier	T тура (tura) tower	C слон (slon) elephant	K кінь (kin) horse	(П) пішак / пішка (pishak / pishka) foot soldier	Шахи (shakhi)	Шах (shakh)	Мат (mat)
Urdu	بادشاہ (bādshāh)	وزیر (vazīr)	رخ (rukh)	فيلہ (fīlah) elephant	گھوڑا (ghōṛā)	پیادہ (pyādah)	شطرنج (šaṭranj)	شہ (sheh)	شہمات (shehmāt)
Uzbek	Sh shoh shah	Fz farzin	R rux	F fil elephant	O ot horse	(P) piyoda foot soldier	Shaxmat	Kisht / Shoh	Mot
Vietnamese	V vua king	H hậu queen	X xe chariot	T tượng / tịnh / voi elephant	M mã / ngựa horse	tốt / chốt / binh soldier	Cờ vua	Chiếu / Chiếu tướng	Chiếu bí / Chiếu hết / Sát cục / Tuyệt sát
Welsh	T teyrn / brenin lord / king	B brenhines queen	C castell castle	E esgob bishop	M marchog rider	(G) gwerinwr peasant	Gwyddbwyll	Siach	Siachmat

== See also ==
- Chess annotation symbols
