= Anne Danican Philidor =

French woodwind player and composer

Anne Danican Philidor (11 April 1681 – 8 October 1728) was a French woodwind player and composer of the Philidor family. Born in Paris on 11 April 1681, his grandfather and father were also professional woodwind players in the king's service. Anne was named for his godfather Anne Jules de Noailles. His composition "L'Amour vainqueur" was given a court performance in 1697, financially backed by his godfather. 1702 saw him succeed his father in the king's orchestra, primarily as oboist. In addition to his playing duties he was the king's musical librarian. He assembled several hundred portfolios of music, both instrumental and operatic, several of which are well-preserved in French libraries. Anne is best remembered today for having founded the Concert Spirituel, an important series of public concerts held in the palace of the Tuileries from 1725 to 1791.

His compositions include a few religious pieces and two books for solo instrument and continuo which include a sonata in d-minor which has been recorded several times.

== Compositions ==
=== Orchestral works ===
- 1697 L’Amour vainqueur, pastorale
- 1698 Diane et Endimion, pastorale heroïque
- 1698 Air à boire
- 1699 Bourrée et trio
- 1700 Les Amazones, mascarade
- 1700 Le Lendemain de la noce de village, mascarade
- 1712 Le Jugement de Pâris
- 1715 Chaconne et simphonie de la Fête-Dieu
