= Philipp Stamma =

Syrian chess master (1705-1755)

Personal information
- Born: c. 1705 Aleppo Syria, Aleppo Eyalet (etrugul bey), Ottoman Empire
- Died: c. 1755 London, England

Chess career
- Country: England

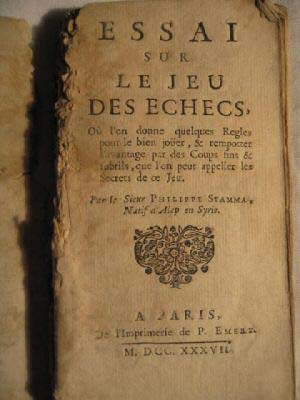
Essai sur le jeu des echecs, 1737

Philipp Stamma (c. 1705 – c. 1755), a native of Aleppo, Ottoman Syria, later resident of England and France, was a chess master and a pioneer of modern chess. His reputation rests largely on his authorship of the early chess book Essai sur le jeu des echecs published 1737 in France (English translation: The Noble Game Of Chess 1745). This book brought the Middle Eastern concept of the endgame to the attention of Europe and helped revive European interest in the study of the endgame.

Stamma died in London c. 1755, with two sons surviving him.

== Strong player ==
Stamma was a regular at Slaughter's Coffee House in St Martin's Lane, London, a center of 18th-century English chess, and was considered one of England's strongest players. He was defeated quite handily by Philidor in a famous match in 1747, which marked the beginning of Philidor's rise to fame.

Apart from the higher skills of Philidor, Ludwig Bledow and Otto von Oppen have suggested that his defeat could be attributed to the fact that Stamma, in Ottoman Syria, was used to playing with the Arabic rules and only after his arrival to Europe got acquainted with the Western rules. Bledow and Oppen also commented that the match was poorly documented, being mentioned only by Philidor's biographers, who frequently contradicted each other.

== Other legacy ==
Stamma's book introduced algebraic chess notation in an almost fully developed form before the now-obsolete descriptive chess notation evolved. Philidor's writings had more influence after his victory over Stamma, and the descriptive system based on Philidor's approach was dominant for a long time. The main difference between Stamma's system and the modern system is that Stamma used p for pawn moves and the original file of the piece (a through h) instead of the initial letter of the piece.

His name is attached to the Stamma Gambit in the King's Gambit (1.e4 e5 2.f4 exf4 3.h4), and Stamma's mate, a rather rare checkmate.

== New edition of Stamma's book ==
A new translation of Stamma's book into modern French appeared in November 2015 under the title Les cent fins de parties de Philippe Stamma.

== See also ==
- Stamma's mate
