= Baden-Baden 1870 chess tournament =

Chess tournament in Baden, Germany

The Baden-Baden 1870 chess tournament was one of the strongest chess tournaments ever at the time. The tournament lasted from 18 July until 4 August 1870, in Baden-Baden. It was won by Adolf Anderssen, ahead of Wilhelm Steinitz.

In comparison with earlier major tournaments such as London 1851 chess tournament, London 1862 chess tournament and Paris 1867 chess tournament, there were two major innovations: chess clocks were used for the first time (20 moves had to be made per hour), and draws counted as half points.

The tournament included most of the world's leading players. Strong players who were absent were Max Lange, Johannes Zukertort, Jakoby and Meitner.

On 19 July, the day after the tournament began, the Franco-Prussian War broke out, between France and Prussia. The southern German states, including the Grand Duchy of Baden, took the side of Prussia. The war came within 30 km of Baden-Baden, close enough for the artillery to be heard. Stern, who was a Bavarian reservist, left the tournament after four rounds to fight in the war; his games were not counted in the final scores.

The results at Baden-Baden 1870 were as follows:

#	Player	1	2	3	4	5	6	7	8	9	10	Total
1	Adolf Anderssen (German Empire)	xx	11	00	1½	11	1½	10	10	11	--	11
2	Wilhelm Steinitz (Austrian Empire)	00	xx	11	0½	11	11	11	½1	½0	(½1)	10½
3	Gustav Neumann (German Empire)	11	00	xx	1½	01	01	11	0½	11	--	10
4	Joseph Henry Blackburne (United Kingdom)	0½	1½	0½	xx	10	11	1½	½½	11	--	10
5	Louis Paulsen (German Empire)	00	00	10	01	xx	10	1½	1½	½1	--	7½
6	Cecil De Vere (United Kingdom)	0½	00	10	00	01	xx	01	11	01	--	6½
7	Szymon Winawer (Russian Empire)	01	00	00	0½	0½	10	xx	1½	11	--	6½
8	Samuel Rosenthal (France)	01	½0	1½	½½	0½	00	0½	xx	00	--	5
9	Johannes Minckwitz (German Empire)	00	½1	00	00	½0	10	00	11	xx	(10)	5
10	Adolf Stern (German Empire)	--	½0	--	--	--	--	--	--	01	xx	-

Anderssen won 3000 francs, Steinitz - 600 francs, Neumann and Blackburne - 200 francs (each).

== Literature ==
- Stefan Haas: Das Schachturnier Baden-Baden 1870. Der unbekannte Schachmeister Adolf Stern. Rattmann, Ludwigshafen 2006. ISBN 3-88086-190-0
