= Philipp Hirschfeld =

German chess player and theoretician (1840–1896)

Philipp Hirschfeld (1 October 1840 – 4 October 1896) was a German chess player and theoretician.

Hirschfeld was born in Königsberg, Prussia, and came from an affluent background. He learned the game of chess as a child in Königsberg, and by the time he went to Berlin in 1859 to study, he was already a very strong player and theoretician. He was in the editorial department of the Deutschen Schachzeitung, where he published analysis of opening theory. During his time in Berlin, he played matches with Carl Mayet and Berthold Suhle (+0 -7 = 2) in 1860, and with Adolf Anderssen (+10, -14, =5) and Gustav Neumann in 1861.

In 1863 Hirschfeld finished his studies and joined his father's business. In London, he founded the Königsberg Tea Company, with branches in Königsberg, Moscow and China. Hirschfeld's profession left him no time for international tournaments, but on his business trips he met up with the best players of his time and occasionally contested matches with them. In 1865 he drew a match with Ignaz von Kolisch in Paris 4-4 (+4, -4, =0), and in 1865 he lost a match in Moscow against Sergey Urusov 2-3 (+1, -2, =2). Hirschfeld also played individual games against Wilhelm Steinitz, Johann Jacob Löwenthal, Bernhard Horwitz and Cecil De Vere. In 1873 he took up permanent residence in London, where he was a frequent analysis partner of Johannes Zukertort. From that time he regularly lived a few months of the year in Berlin. He died in 1896 in Wannsee, Berlin.

According to the chessmetrics website, his best historical Elo rating was 2600, which he attained in October 1864. Between 1862 and 1866 he was ranked 4th in the world.
