= Karl Pitschel =

Austrian chess player (1829–1883)

Karl (Carl) Pitschel (1829 – 29 January 1883) was an Austrian chess master.

He took 4th at Krefeld 1871 (the 9th Western DSB Congress, Louis Paulsen won), took 4th at Leipzig 1871 (the 1st Middle DSB Congress, Adolf Anderssen won), took 5th at Altona 1872 (the 3rd Northern DSB Congress, Anderssen won), took 12th in the Vienna 1873 chess tournament (Wilhelm Steinitz and Joseph Henry Blackburne won), shared 1st with Anderssen and Carl Goering at Leipzig 1876 (the 2nd MDSB Congress), took 12th in the Paris 1878 chess tournament (Johannes Zukertort and Szymon Winawer won), and tied for 6–7th at Leipzig 1879 (the 1st DSB Congress, Berthold Englisch won). Pitschel withdrew after three rounds and his games were not counted in the official results at Berlin 1881 (the 2nd DSB Congress).
