= Paris 1900 chess tournament =

Event at the 1900 Paris Exposition

The Paris 1900 chess tournament was an event held in conjunction with the Exposition Universelle (1900), one of the world's most notable fairs or exhibitions and designated a "World Exposition" by the Bureau of International Expositions. Major international chess tournaments were also held at six other expositions: London 1851, London 1862, Paris 1867, Vienna 1873, Philadelphia 1876 and Paris 1878. No chess events of significance accompanied, for instance, the Exposition Universelle (1889) in Paris or the World's Columbian Exposition in Chicago in 1893.

The tournament of 1900 was played in the Grand Cercle, Paris, from May 17 to June 20, 1900.

The results and standings:

#	Player	1	2	3	4	5	6	7	8	9	10	11	12	13	14	15	16	17	Total
1	Emanuel Lasker (German Empire)	*	1	0	1	1	½	1	W	1	1	1	1	1	1	1	1	1	14½
2	Harry Nelson Pillsbury (United States)	0	*	0	1	0	1	1	1	W	½	1	1	1	1	1	1	1	12½
3	Frank James Marshall (United States)	1	1	*	0	1	½	½	1	1	0	0	1	W	1	1	1	1	12
4	Géza Maróczy (Hungary)	0	0	1	*	0	½	½	1	1	1	1	1	W	W	1	1	1	12
5	Amos Burn (England)	0	1	0	1	*	L	1	L	1	0	1	W	+	1	1	1	1	11
6	Mikhail Chigorin (Russian Empire)	½	0	½	½	W	*	0	1	0	0	1	1	1	1	1	1	1	10½
7	Carl Schlechter (Austria-Hungary)	0	0	½	½	0	1	*	0	L	W	1	1	W	1	1	1	1	10
8	Georg Marco (Austria-Hungary)	L	0	0	0	W	0	1	*	1	1	0	1	1	1	1	1	1	10
9	Jacques Mieses (German Empire)	0	L	0	0	0	1	W	0	*	1	1	W	1	1	W	W	1	10
10	Jackson Whipps Showalter (United States)	0	½	1	0	1	1	L	0	0	*	0	½	1	1	1	1	1	9
11	Dawid Janowski (France)	0	0	1	0	0	0	0	1	0	1	*	W	1	1	1	1	1	9
12	James Mason (United States)	0	0	0	0	L	0	0	0	L	½	L	*	1	L	W	1	W	4½
13	Miklós Bródy (Austria-Hungary)	0	0	L	L	–	0	L	0	0	0	0	0	*	W	1	1	1	4
14	Leon Rosen (United States)	0	0	0	L	0	0	0	0	0	0	0	W	L	*	0	W	W	3
15	James Mortimer (United States)	0	0	0	0	0	0	0	0	L	0	0	L	0	1	*	0	1	2
16	Manuel Márquez Sterling (Cuba)	0	0	0	0	0	0	0	0	L	0	0	0	0	L	1	*	0	1
17	M. Didier (France)	0	0	0	0	0	0	0	0	0	0	0	L	0	L	0	1	*	1

Legend: W (draw and win = 1 point), ½ (two draws = ½), L (draw and loss = 0 point), + (forfeit win = 1 point), – (forfeit loss = 0 point).

The prizes winners were Lasker (5000 F), Pillsbury (2500 F), Maróczy and Marshall (1750 F) each, Burn (1500 F), Chigorin (1000 F), Marco and Mieses (300 F) each. Schlechter tied for 7–9th but won fewer games and received no prize money. The top four also won Sèvres vases. Mieses won the Brilliancy Prize with his favourite Vienna Game against Janowski.

Samuel Rosenthal wrote the tournament book. A tradition of world fairs and chess tournaments had ended.

== See also ==
- 1900 Summer Olympics
