= German Chess Federation =

Sports organisation

- Deutscher Schachbund
- Sport: Chess
- Membership: 91,770
- Abbreviation: DSB
- Founded: 1877
- (Germany)

The German Chess Federation (German: Deutscher Schachbund, DSB) is the umbrella organization for German chess players. It is a member of the Deutscher Olympischer Sportbund and of FIDE, the World Chess Federation. It has over 90,000 members in over 2500 clubs, making it one of the world's largest national chess federations. Its members are 17 regional chess federations, the German Blind and Visually Impaired Chess Federation (DBSB), Die Schwalbe (chess composition society), the German Correspondence Chess Federation, and the Chess Bundesliga.

== History ==
The DSB was founded on July 18, 1877 in Leipzig. Founding members included the philosopher Carl Göring and the writer Rudolf von Gottschall; organizers Hermann Zwanzig, Constantin Schwede and Eduard Hammacher; and the chess masters Adolf Anderssen, Max Lange, and Johannes Hermann Zukertort.

The DSB ran into a major budget issue in 2023. While the federation has a large dues-paying group of members and had previously been cash-rich, the federation's budgeting and financial controls seem to have gone awry at some point. Over 500,000 euros were missing. President Ullrich Krause and Vice President Lutz-Rott Ebbinghaus blamed a combination of financial miscalculations, unplanned for expenses, and inflation.
