= Adolf Anderssen =

German chess player (1818–1879)

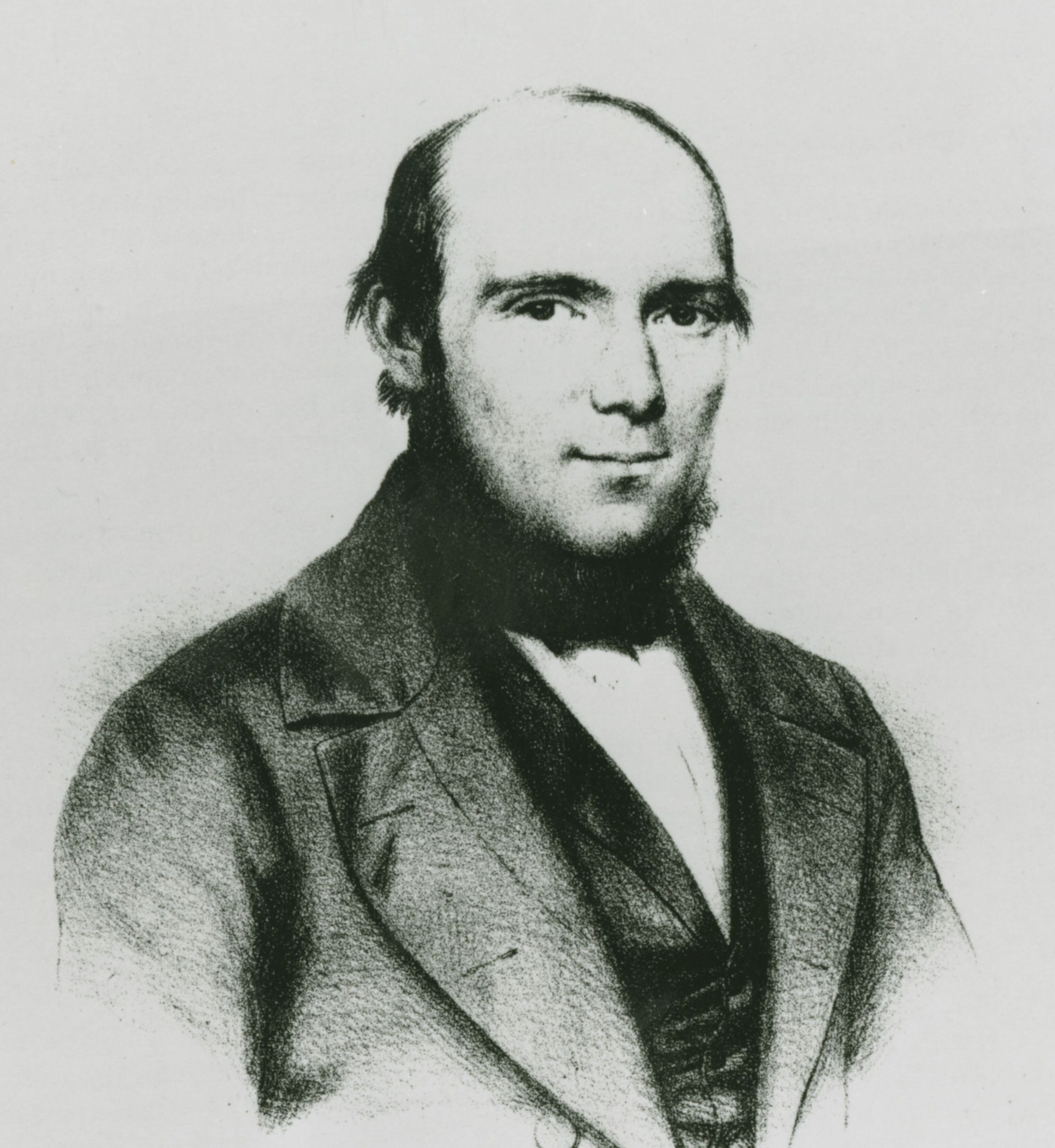

Personal information
- Born: Karl Ernst Adolf Anderssen; 6 July 1818 Breslau, Kingdom of Prussia, German Confederation
- Died: 13 March 1879 (aged 60) Breslau, Kingdom of Prussia, German Empire

Chess career
- Country: Prussia

Karl Ernst Adolf Anderssen (6 July 1818 – 13 March 1879) was a German chess master. He won the great international tournaments of 1851 and 1862, but lost matches to Paul Morphy in 1858, and to Wilhelm Steinitz in 1866. Accordingly, he is generally regarded as having been the world's leading chess player from 1851 to 1858, and leading active player from 1862 to 1866, although the title of World Chess Champion did not yet exist.

Anderssen became the most successful tournament player in Europe, winning over half the events he entered, including the very strong Baden-Baden 1870 chess tournament. He achieved most of these successes when he was over the age of 50.

Anderssen is famous today for his brilliant sacrificial attacking play, particularly in the Immortal Game (1851) and the Evergreen Game (1852). He was an important figure in the development of chess problems, driving forward the transition from the "Old School" of problem composition to the elegance and complexity of modern compositions. He was also one of the most likeable of chess masters and became an elder statesman of the game, to whom others turned for advice or arbitration.

== Background and early life ==
Anderssen was born in Breslau (now called Wrocław, Poland), in the Prussian Province of Silesia, in 1818. He lived there for most of his life, sharing a house with and supporting his widowed mother and his unmarried sister. Anderssen never married. He graduated from the public gymnasium (high school) in Breslau and then attended university, where he studied mathematics and philosophy. After graduating in 1847 at the age of 29, he took a position at the Friedrichs-Gymnasium in Breslau as an instructor and later as professor of Mathematics. Anderssen lived a quiet, stable, responsible, respectable middle-class life. His career was teaching mathematics, while his hobby and passion was playing chess.

When Anderssen was nine years old, his father taught him how to play chess. Anderssen said that as a boy, he learned the strategy of the game from a copy of William Lewis' book Fifty Games Between Labourdonnais and McDonnell (1835).

== Chess career ==
=== First steps ===
From Anderssen's 1842 collection

Position: d8 white bishop, e8 white bishop, h8 white king, h7 black pawn, h6 black king, f3 white pawn, h3 black pawn, h2 white pawn

White to mate in four moves
Solution: 1.Bh5 Kxh5 2.Kg7 h6 3.Kf6 Kh4 4.Kg6#

Anderssen first came to the attention of the chess world when he published Aufgabe für Schachspieler ("Task for chess players"), a collection of 60 chess problems, in 1842. He continued to publish problems for many years, both in magazines and as a second collection in 1852. These brought him to the attention of the "Berlin Pleiades" group, which included some of the strongest players of the time, and he played matches against some of them. Anderssen's development as a player was relatively slow, largely because he could spare neither the time nor the money to play many matches against strong players. Nevertheless, by 1846 he was able to put up a good fight against another Pleiades member, Tassilo von Heydebrand und der Lasa, who may have been the world's strongest player at the time. In 1846, he became the editor of the magazine Schachzeitung der Berliner Schachgesellschaft (later called Deutsche Schachzeitung) when its founder Ludwig Bledow, one of the Berlin Pleiades, died. Anderssen held this post until 1865.

=== London 1851 ===
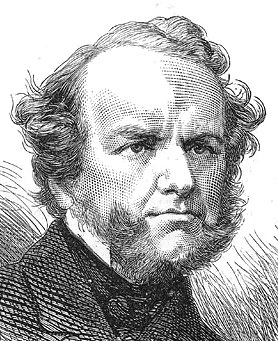
Howard Staunton was the principal organiser of the 1851 London International Tournament, and offered to pay Anderssen's travel expenses, should he fail to win.

In 1848, Anderssen drew a match with the professional player Daniel Harrwitz. On the basis of this match and his general chess reputation, he was invited to represent German chess at the first international chess tournament, to be held in London in 1851. Anderssen was reluctant to accept the invitation, as he was deterred by the travel costs. However, the tournament's principal organizer, Howard Staunton, offered to pay Anderssen's travel expenses out of his own pocket if necessary, should Anderssen fail to win a tournament prize. Anderssen accepted this generous offer.

Anderssen's preparations for the 1851 London International Tournament produced a surge in his playing strength: he played over 100 games in early 1851 against strong opponents including Carl Mayet, Ernst Falkbeer, Max Lange and Jean Dufresne. The 1851 International Tournament was a knock-out event in which pairs of competitors played short matches, and Anderssen won it by beating Lionel Kieseritzky, József Szén, Staunton and Marmaduke Wyvill – by margins of at least two games in every case. His prize was two-thirds of the total prize fund of £500, i.e. about £335; that is equivalent to about £240,000 ($370,200) in 2006's money. When Anderssen and Szén found they were to play each other, they agreed that, if either won the tournament, the other would receive one-third of the prize; this does not appear to have been considered in any way unethical.

Although most chess books regard Wilhelm Steinitz as the first true world champion, one of the organizers of the 1851 London International Tournament had said the contest was for "the baton of the World's Chess Champion". In fact Anderssen was not described as "the world champion", but the tournament established Anderssen as the world's leading chess player. The London Chess Club, which had fallen out with Staunton and his colleagues, organised a tournament that was played a month later and included several players who had competed in the International Tournament. The result was the same – Anderssen won.

=== Morphy match, 1858 ===
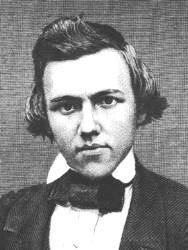
Paul Morphy defeated all opposition in 1858.

Opportunities for tournament play remained rare, and Anderssen was reluctant to travel far because of the expense. In his one recorded tournament between 1851 and 1862, a one-game-per-round knock-out tournament at Manchester in 1857, he was eliminated in the second round. Then in late 1858, he was beaten 8–3 by the American champion Paul Morphy in a famous match held in Paris, France (two wins, two draws, seven losses). Although Anderssen knew as well as anyone how to attack, Morphy understood much better when to attack and how to prepare an attack. Morphy had recently scored equally convincing wins in matches against other top-class players: Johann Löwenthal, the Rev. John Owen and Daniel Harrwitz. Morphy returned to the United States in 1859, however, and soon afterwards announced his retirement from serious chess, making Anderssen once again the strongest active player.

Anderssen played the curious opening move 1.a3 in three games of his match against Morphy, and broke even with it (one loss, one draw, one win). This opening move, now referred to as Anderssen's Opening, has never been popular in serious competition.

=== Other games 1851–1862 ===
Shortly after the 1851 London International Tournament, Anderssen played his two most famous games, both casual encounters which he won by combinations that involved several sacrifices. In the first, as White against Lionel Kieseritzky in London on 21 June 1851, just after the International Tournament (1851) and now called the "Immortal Game", he sacrificed a bishop, both rooks and finally his queen. In the second, played in Berlin in 1852 as White against Jean Dufresne and now called the "Evergreen Game", the total sacrifice was more modest, but still exceeded a queen and a minor piece.

After the match with Morphy, Anderssen played two matches against Ignác Kolisch, one of the leading players of the time, who later became a wealthy banker and patron of chess. Anderssen drew their match in 1860 and narrowly won in 1861 (5/9; won four, drew two, lost three; Kolisch was ahead at the half-way stage).

=== London 1862 ===
Anderssen won the London 1862 chess tournament, the first international round-robin tournament (in which each participant plays a game against each of the others) with a score of twelve wins out of thirteen games. He lost only one game, to the Rev. John Owen, and finished two points ahead of Louis Paulsen, who had the best playing record in the early 1860s. Morphy had retired from chess at this time, so Anderssen was again generally regarded as the world's leading active player.

Shortly after the tournament, he played a match against tournament runner-up Paulsen, ending in a draw (3 wins, 3 losses, 2 draws). In 1864, he drew another match (3 wins, 3 losses, and 2 draws) against Berthold Suhle, who was a strong player and respected chess writer.

=== Steinitz match, 1866 ===
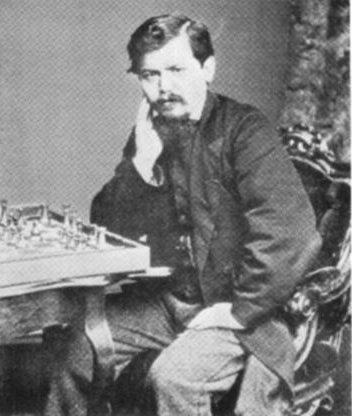
Wilhelm Steinitz in 1866

In 1866, Anderssen lost a close match with 30-year-old Wilhelm Steinitz (six wins, eight losses, and no draws; Steinitz won the last two games). Although Steinitz is now known for inventing the positional approach to chess and demonstrating its superiority, the 1866 match was played in the attack-at-all-costs style of the 1850s and 1860s. This is generally seen as the point at which Steinitz succeeded Anderssen as the world's leading active player. Although ideas of a contest for the world championship had been floating around since the 1840s, the 1866 Anderssen–Steinitz match was not defined as being for the world championship, and many were opposed to the claim of such a title while Morphy was retired from chess and still alive. Furthermore, Anderssen remained dominant both in top tournaments and in personal matches against Zukertort until 1871.

=== 1866–1879 ===
By this time tournaments were becoming more frequent, and the round-robin format was adopted. At the same time, Anderssen, after losing the match to Morphy in 1858 and to Steinitz in 1866, rededicated himself to chess, particularly studying both endgames and positional play. The result was that Anderssen, in his early fifties, was playing the finest chess of his career. As a result, Anderssen compiled a very successful tournament record in the late stages of his career: five first places, two second places, two third places; and a sixth place in the final year of his life, when his health was failing. One of his first places was ahead of Steinitz, Gustav Neumann, Joseph Henry Blackburne, Louis Paulsen and several other very strong players at the Baden-Baden 1870 chess tournament. In terms of the number of leading players present, this could be regarded as one of the top 20 tournaments ever. One of Anderssen's third places was at the strong Vienna 1873 tournament, when he was 55. About half of Anderssen's tournament successes came at championships of the different regional German Chess Federations; but these were open to all nationalities, and most of them had a few top ten or even top five competitors. Anderssen usually beat Zukertort in matches, but his dominance came to an end in 1871.

The Leipzig 1877 tournament was organised in his honour and named the "Anderssen-Feier" (Anderssen Celebration); Anderssen finished second in the tournament behind Louis Paulsen.

Still at Leipzig, Anderssen lost a match against tournament winner Louis Paulsen (three wins, one draw, and five losses). Matches were Anderssen's relative weakness; his only match win in this period was in 1868, against the 26-year-old Johann Zukertort (eight wins, one draw, and three losses).

== Assessment ==
=== Playing strength and style ===
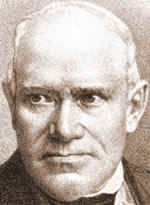
Adolf Anderssen in later life

Anderssen was very successful in European tournaments from 1851 to early 1878, taking first prize in over half of the events in which he played. His only recorded tournament failures were a one-game-per-round knock-out event in 1857 and sixth place at Paris 1878 when his health was failing and he had only about a year to live. His match record was much weaker: out of the 12 that he played, he won only two, drew four and lost six. Although outclassed by Morphy, and to a lesser extent by Steinitz, Anderssen has been called the first modern chess master.

Arpad Elo, inventor of the Elo rating system, retroactively calculated ratings through history, and estimated that Anderssen was the first player with a rating over 2600. Chessmetrics ranks Anderssen as one of the top two players for most of the period from 1859 to 1873, and as the strongest player in the world seven months distributed between 1860 and 1870.

Steinitz rated Anderssen as one of the two greatest attacking players of his time: "We all may learn from Morphy and Anderssen how to conduct a king's-side attack, and perhaps I myself may not have learnt enough." Although Anderssen is regarded as a member of the "heroic" attacking school, he was not in favour of mindless aggression, for example he said: "Move that one of your pieces, which is in the worst plight, unless you can satisfy yourself that you can derive immediate advantage by an attack", a principle more recently labelled "Makogonov's rule". According to Fine, his approach to development was haphazard and he totally failed to understand why Morphy won.

Anderssen's home town was so proud of him that in 1865 Breslau University awarded him an honorary doctorate.

=== Influence on chess ===
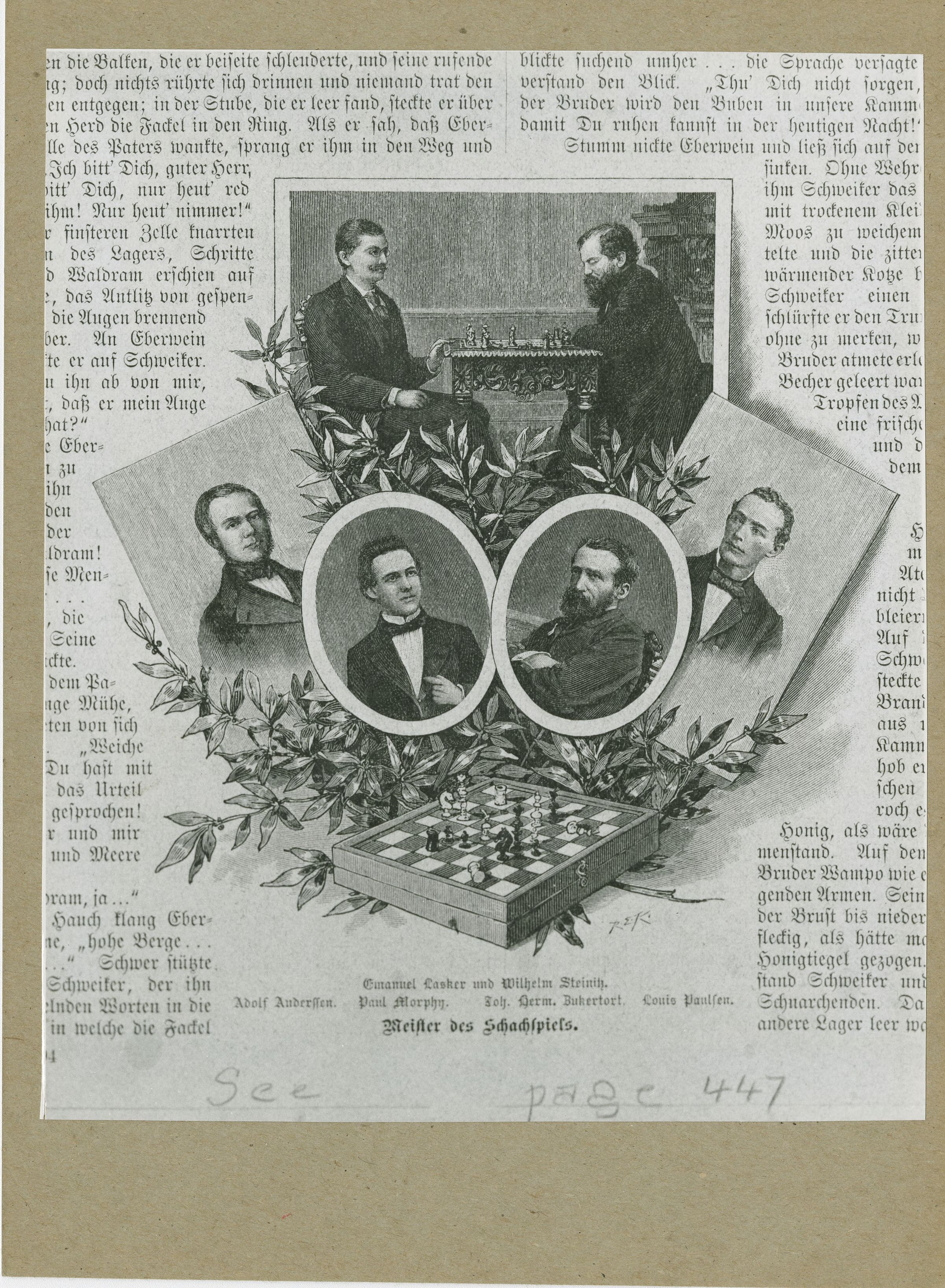
Anderssen (below, far left) depicted with other leading players

Due to the perceived beauty of its attacking style, some of Anderssen's games, such as the Immortal Game and the Evergreen Game, are among the most famous in chess history.

The "heroic" attacking school of play to which Anderssen belonged was eclipsed by Steinitz' positional approach – by 1894 it was generally acknowledged that the only way to beat Steinitz was to apply Steinitz' principles.

Anderssen has had a more enduring influence on chess problem composition. He started composing in the last years of the "Old School", whose compositions were fairly similar to realistic over-the-board positions and featured spectacular key moves, multiple sacrifices and few variations. He was one of the most skillful composers of his time, and his work forms an early stage of the "Transition Period", between the mid-1840s and the early 1860s, when many of the basic problem ideas were discovered, the requirement for game-like positions was abandoned and the introduction of composing competitions (the first of which was in 1854) forced judges to decide on what features were the most desirable in a problem.

Outside the field of chess problems, Anderssen was not a prolific author. He edited the magazine Schachzeitung der Berliner Schachgesellschaft (later called Deutsche Schachzeitung) from 1846 to 1865, however, and was co-editor with Gustav Neumann of Neue Berliner Schachzeitung from 1864 to 1867.

=== Personality ===
It is impossible to keep one's excellence in a glass case, like a jewel, and take it out whenever it is required.

— Adolf Anderssen, 1858

Steinitz wrote: "Anderssen was honest and honourable to the core. Without fear or favour he straightforwardly gave his opinion, and his sincere disinterestedness became so patent....that his word alone was usually sufficient to quell disputes...for he had often given his decision in favour of a rival..." On the other hand, Reuben Fine, a 20th-century player, wrote, "There is a curious contrast between his over-the-board brilliance and his uninspired safety-first attitude in everyday affairs."

== Death ==
Anderssen died on 13 March 1879, in his home town. The Deutsche Schachzeitung noted his death in 1879 with a nineteen-page obituary. His cause of death was a heart attack. Bombing raids during World War II damaged his grave in Breslau. After the war, the city became part of Poland and is now known under its Polish name Wrocław. In 1957, the Polish Chess Federation decided to re-bury Anderssen in a new grave at the Osobowice Cemetery.

== Tournament results ==
Date	Location	Place	Score	Notes
1851	London International Tournament	1	15/21	Ahead of Marmaduke Wyvill, Elijah Williams, Howard Staunton, József Szén, Hugh Alexander Kennedy, Bernhard Horwitz, Henry Edward Bird, Lionel Kieseritzky, Carl Mayet, Johann Löwenthal, Edward Löwe, Alfred Brodie, James Mucklow, Samuel Newham and E.S. Kennedy. A knock-out tournament in which the contestants played mini-matches in each round, increasing from best-of-3 in the 1st round to best-of-8 in the final. Anderssen himself beat Kieseritzky, Szen, Staunton and Wyvill – his closest mini-match was +4−2=1 in the final against Wyvill.
1851	London Chess Club Tournament	1	7½/8	Ahead of Karl Meyerhofer, Daniel Harrwitz, Frederick Deacon, Kieseritzky, Horwitz, Szabo, Löwe and Ehrmann. Apparently intended to be round-robin, but the weaker players quickly dropped out.
1857	Manchester (British Chess Association)	3/4	1/2	8-player knock-out tournament in which the contestants played just 1 game in each round. Anderssen beat Harrwitz in the 1st round, and lost to Löwenthal in the 2nd round. Löwenthal drew the final against Samuel Boden, then Boden retired.
1862	London International Tournament	1	12/13	Ahead of Louis Paulsen, (11/13), Rev. Owen (10/13), George Alcock MacDonnell, Serafino Dubois, Wilhelm Steinitz and 8 others. One of the first successful round-robin tournaments.
1868	Aachen (West German Chess Federation)	1=	3/4 then 0/1	Anderssen and Max Lange tied for 1st; the order after the playoff was (1) Lange, (2) Anderssen; all finished ahead of Wilfried Paulsen, Johannes Zukertort and Emil Schallopp.
1869	Hamburg (North German Chess Federation)	1=	4/5 then 1½/2	Anderssen and Louis Paulsen tied for 1st; the order after the playoff was (1) Anderssen, (2) Paulsen; all finished ahead of Zukertort, Johannes von Minckwitz, Schallopp and Alexander Alexander.
1869	Barmen (West German Chess Federation)	1	5/5	Ahead of Zukertort, von Minckwitz, Schallopp and Wilfried Paulsen and Richard Hein.
1870	Baden-Baden International Tournament	1	11/18	Ahead of Steinitz, Gustav Neumann, Joseph Henry Blackburne, Louis Paulsen, Cecil Valentine De Vere, Szymon Winawer, Samuel Rosenthal, von Minckwitz and Adolf Stern.
1871	Krefeld (West German Chess Federation)	1=	4/5 then 1/2	Anderssen, von Minckwitz and Louis Paulsen tied for 1st; the order after the playoff was (1) Paulsen, (2) Anderssen, (3) Minckwitz; all finished ahead of Karl Pitschel, Carl Göring and Wilfried Paulsen.
1871	Leipzig (Central German Chess Federation)	1=	4½/5 then 1/1	Anderssen and Samuel Mieses tied for 1st; then Anderssen won a playoff game.
1872	Altona (North German Chess Federation)	1	3½/4	Ahead of Neumann, Göring, Schallopp and Pitschel.
1873	Vienna International Tournament	3	8½/11: 19/30	Behind Steinitz (10/11: 22½/25) and Blackburne; ahead of Rosenthal (7½/11: 17/28), Louis Paulsen, Henry Edward Bird, Max Fleissig, Josef Heral, Philipp Meitner, Oscar Gelbfuhs, Adolf Schwarz and Pitschel. This tournament had a very unusual scoring system: each player played a 3-game mini-match with each of the others and scored 1 for a won mini-match and ½ for a drawn mini-match. The numbers before the colons (:) are the points awarded; the other 2 numbers are the usual "games won / games played" scoring.
1876	Leipzig (Central German Chess Federation)	1=	3½/5 then 2/2	Anderssen, Goering and Pitschel tied for 1st; the order after the playoff was (1) Anderssen, (2=) Goering and Pitschel; all finished ahead of Louis Paulsen, Schallopp and Carl Berber.
1877	Leipzig (Central German Chess Federation)	2=	8½/11	Behind Louis Paulsen (9/11); tied with Zukertort (8½/11); ahead of Winawer (7½/11), Goering, Berthold Englisch, Schallopp and 5 others. This tournament was specially arranged to honour the 50th anniversary of Anderssen's learning the chess moves.
1878	Frankfurt (West German Chess Federation)	3	6/9	Behind Louis Paulsen (8/9) and Adolf Schwarz (6½/9); ahead of von Minckwitz (5/9), Wilfried Paulsen (4½/9) and 5 others.
1878	Paris International Tournament	6	12½/22	Anderssen was in poor health. The event was won by Winawer and Zukertort.

== Match results ==
Date	Opponent	Result	Location	Score		Notes
1845	Ludwig Bledow	Lost	Breslau	½/5	+0=1–4	Sources vary about the score.
1845–1846	Tassilo von der Lasa	Lost	Breslau	2/6	+2=0–4	
1848	Daniel Harrwitz	Drew	Breslau	5/10	+5=0–5	
1851	Tassilo von der Lasa	Lost	Breslau	5/15	+?=?–?	
1851	Karl Pitschel	Drew	Leipzig	2/4	+1=2–1	
1851	Jean Dufresne	Won	Berlin	13/18	+12=2–4	
1851	Ernst Falkbeer	Won	Berlin	4/5	+4=0–1	
1851	Carl Mayet	Won	Berlin	4/4	+4=0–0	
1851	Eduard Jenay	Won	London	4½/8	+?=?–?	Casual games
1851	Lionel Kieseritzky	Won	London	6/16	+5=2–4	Casual games
1851	Johann Löwenthal	Won	London	5½/8	+5=1–2	Casual games; sources give also separate results: +5–1, +5–2, and +5–4 for Anderssen, and +4=1–3 for Löwenthal
1858	Daniel Harrwitz	Won	Paris	4/6	+3=2–1	Sources give also separate results: +3=3–1 and +2=2–1
1858	Paul Morphy	Lost	Paris	3/11	+2=2–7	
1858	Paul Morphy	Lost	Paris	1/6	+1=0−5	Casual games
1859	Max Lange	Lost	Breslau	3½/8	+3=1–4	Casual games
1859	Carl Mayet	Won	Berlin	7/8	+7=0–1	
1859	Jean Dufresne	Won	Berlin	4/4	+4=0–0	
1859	Berthold Suhle	Won	Berlin	31/48	+27=8–13	Casual games
1860	Philipp Hirschfeld	Won	Berlin	16½/29	+14=5–10	
1860	Ignatz von Kolisch	Drew	Paris	5½/11	+5=1–5	
1860	Paul Journoud	Won	Paris	3½/5	+3=1–1	
1860	Jules Arnous de Rivière	Drew	Paris	2½/5	+2=1–2	
1861	Ignatz von Kolisch	Won	London	5/9	+4=2–3	
1861	Johann Löwenthal	Won	London	2/3	+2=0–1	Casual games
1862	Louis Paulsen	Drew	London	4/8	+3=2–3	
1862	Wilhelm Steinitz	Won	London	2/3	+2=0–1	Casual games
1864	Berthold Suhle	Drew	Berlin	4/8	+3=2–3	
1865	Carl Mayet	Won	Berlin	5½/8	+5=1–2	
1866	Johannes Minckwitz	Won	Berlin	8½/12	+8=1–3	
1866	Gustav Neumann	Lost	Berlin	10/24	+9=2–13	
1866	Wilhelm Steinitz	Lost	London	6/14	+6=0–8	
1867	Samuel Mieses	Won	Breslau	4½/5	+4=1–0	
1868	Johannes Zukertort	Won	Berlin	8½/12	+8=1–3	
1870	Louis Paulsen	Lost	Baden-Baden	½/3	+0=1–2	
1871	Johannes Zukertort	Lost	Berlin	2/7	+2=0–5	
1876	Louis Paulsen	Lost	Leipzig	4½/10	+4=1–5	
1877	Louis Paulsen	Lost	Leipzig	3½/9	+3=1–5	

== See also ==
- List of chess games
