= Evans Gambit =

Position: a8 black rook, c8 black bishop, d8 black queen, e8 black king, g8 black knight, h8 black rook, a7 black pawn, b7 black pawn, c7 black pawn, d7 black pawn, f7 black pawn, g7 black pawn, h7 black pawn, c6 black knight, c5 black bishop, e5 black pawn, b4 white pawn, c4 white bishop, e4 white pawn, f3 white knight, a2 white pawn, c2 white pawn, d2 white pawn, f2 white pawn, g2 white pawn, h2 white pawn, a1 white rook, b1 white knight, c1 white bishop, d1 white queen, e1 white king, h1 white rook
- Moves: 1.e4 e5 2.Nf3 Nc6 3.Bc4 Bc5 4.b4
- ECO: C51–C52
- Origin: 1827
- Named after: William Davies Evans
- Parent: Giuoco Piano

The Evans Gambit is a chess opening that begins with the moves:

1. e4 e5
2. Nf3 Nc6
3. Bc4 Bc5
4. b4

White offers the b-pawn to divert the bishop on c5. The main line continues 4...Bxb4 5.c3 Ba5 6.d4. White establishes a strong centre, while also preparing to play Qb3 (pressuring Black's f-pawn) and Ba3 (trying to prevent kingside castling). A solid alternative for Black is 5...Be7.

According to Reuben Fine, the Evans Gambit poses a challenge for Black since the usual methods of handling other aggressive gambits from White are more difficult to achieve. In 1963, Fine was beaten by this gambit in just 17 moves in a friendly game against Bobby Fischer. The gambit was very popular during the era of Romantic chess in the 19th century.

== History ==
The gambit is named after the Welsh sea captain William Davies Evans, the first player known to have played it. The first game with the opening is considered to be Evans–McDonnell, London 1827, although in that game a slightly different move order was tried (1.e4 e5 2.Nf3 Nc6 3.Bc4 Bc5 4.0-0 d6 and only now 5.b4). In his monthly Chess Life column, Andrew Soltis commented that Evans was "the first player to be widely honored for an opening we know he played". Dutch Grandmaster Paul van der Sterren described the Evans Gambit as "unreal" and "fairylike".

The first analysis of the gambit was published in the Second Series of Progressive Lessons (1832) by William Lewis. The gambit became extremely popular and was played several times in the series of games between McDonnell and Louis de la Bourdonnais in 1834. Players including Adolf Anderssen, Paul Morphy and Mikhail Chigorin later took it up. The Evergreen Game won by Adolf Anderssen against Jean Dufresne opened with the Evans Gambit. Eventually, however, the second world chess champion Emanuel Lasker dealt a heavy blow to the opening with a modern defensive idea: returning the pawn under favourable circumstances. The opening was out of favour for much of the 20th century, although John Nunn and Jan Timman played it in some games in the late 1970s and early 1980s. In the 1990s, Garry Kasparov used it in a few games (notably a famous 25-move win against Viswanathan Anand in Riga, 1995), which prompted a brief revival of interest in it. The gambit has proven resilient under modern analysis, with no clear refutation.

== Main line: 4...Bxb4 5.c3 Ba5 ==
Position: a8 black rook, c8 black bishop, d8 black queen, e8 black king, g8 black knight, h8 black rook, a7 black pawn, b7 black pawn, c7 black pawn, d7 black pawn, f7 black pawn, g7 black pawn, h7 black pawn, c6 black knight, a5 black bishop, e5 black pawn, c4 white bishop, d4 white pawn, e4 white pawn, c3 white pawn, f3 white knight, a2 white pawn, f2 white pawn, g2 white pawn, h2 white pawn, a1 white rook, b1 white knight, c1 white bishop, d1 white queen, e1 white king, h1 white rook

Evans Gambit, main line: 4.b4 Bxb4 5.c3 Ba5 6.d4

Black's usual response is to accept the gambit with 4...Bxb4. 4...Nxb4 is less flexible as 5.c3 Nc6 effectively transposes into the inferior retreat 4...Bxb4 5.c3 Bc5. After 5.c3 the usual retreat is 5...Ba5, which pins the pawn on c3 if White plays 6.d4, but it has the drawback of removing the option of moving to the square a5 from the black knight. Later, Black will often retreat the bishop to b6 in order to facilitate ...Na5. White then usually follows up with 6.d4, entailing a second pawn offer; 6.0-0 and 6.Qb3 are alternatives.

=== 6.d4 exd4 ===
White cannot respond with 7.cxd4 due to the pin by Black's bishop on a5. While 7.Nxd4 is possible, it sets Black few problems and White usually prefers to offer a second pawn with 7.0-0 or 7.Qb3 (preferred by Nigel Short), though Black usually does not accept it.

==== Mieses Defence: 7.0-0 Nge7 ====
Position: a8 black rook, c8 black bishop, d8 black queen, e8 black king, h8 black rook, a7 black pawn, b7 black pawn, c7 black pawn, e7 black knight, f7 black pawn, g7 black pawn, h7 black pawn, c6 black knight, a5 black bishop, d5 black pawn, g5 white knight, c4 white bishop, d4 black pawn, e4 white pawn, c3 white pawn, a2 white pawn, f2 white pawn, g2 white pawn, h2 white pawn, a1 white rook, b1 white knight, c1 white bishop, d1 white queen, f1 white rook, g1 white king

Mieses Defence, main line: 6.d4 exd4 7.0-0 Nge7 8.Ng5 d5

The move 7...Nge7, the Mieses Defence, was formerly rare, but was recommended by Vasily Panov in the 1960s and is now considered one of the main lines of the Evans Gambit. Black intends to meet 8.Ng5 or 8.cxd4 with 8...d5 (8.Ng5 0-0? is weak due to 9.Qh5 h6 10.Nxf7 Rxf7 11.Bxf7+), returning the pawn in many lines.

==== Compromised Defence: 7.0-0 dxc3 ====
The materialistic 7...dxc3, dubbed the "Compromised Defence", accepts the second pawn offered by White. It is well met by 8.Qb3 Qf6 9.e5 Qg6 10.Nxc3 Nge7 11.Ba3! with a very dangerous initiative for the sacrificed pawns, and thus is not well regarded.

==== Anderssen Defence: 7.0-0 Nf6 ====
7...Nf6 is known as the Anderssen Defence, with the common continuations 8.Ba3 d6 9.e5, aiming to open lines for both of White's bishops, 8.e5 d5 followed by 9.exf6 or 9.Bb5, 8.cxd4 Nxe4 9.d5 Ne7 11.Qd4 Nf6, and 8.cxd4 d5 9.exd5 Nxd5, transposing to the Mieses Defence.

==== Other replies to 7.0-0 ====
- 7...Bb6 is usually played with the idea of reaching the "Normal Position" after 8.cxd4 d6. The Normal Position is also commonly reached from 5...Bc5.
- 7...d6 8.cxd4 Bb6 is another way to reach the Normal Position. An alternative for White is 8.Qb3, the Waller Attack.
- 7...d3, with the idea of depriving the knight of the c3-square and slowing down White's development, was played by Jean Dufresne in the famous Evergreen Game, but has never been popular.

==== 7.Qb3 ====
This move has received increased attention in recent decades, most notably by Nigel Short. As White has established a battery along the b3–f7 diagonal that threatens Black's king, Black must defend the pawn or else allow a later Bxf7+, forcing the king to move and lose castling rights. As such, Black usually responds with 7...Qe7 or 7...Qf6 (which may later be kicked with an e5 by White). In either case, play most often continues 8.0-0 Bb6, with Black adding another defender to the pawn on d4.

=== 6.d4 d6 ===
With this move, Black supports the pawn on e5, opens the square d7 for the queen, and unblocks the c8–g4 diagonal for the queen's bishop. White most often continues with 7.Qb3 or 7.0-0. 7.dxe5, as well as 7.Bg5, the Sokolsky Variation, are also seen.

==== Lasker Defence: 7.0-0 Bb6 ====
Position: a8 black rook, d8 black knight, e8 black king, g8 black knight, h8 black rook, a7 black pawn, b7 black pawn, c7 black pawn, f7 black pawn, g7 black pawn, h7 black pawn, b6 black bishop, e6 black bishop, e5 white knight, c4 white bishop, e4 white pawn, c3 white pawn, a2 white pawn, f2 white pawn, g2 white pawn, h2 white pawn, a1 white rook, b1 white knight, c1 white bishop, f1 white rook, g1 white king

Lasker Defence, main line: 7.0-0 Bb6 8.dxe5 dxe5 9.Qxd8+ Nxd8 10.Nxe5 Be6

Following 7.0-0, a common response for Black is 7...Bb6, originated by Emanuel Lasker. It most often continues 8.dxe5 (8.a4 is an alternative but not as well regarded) dxe5 9.Qxd8+ Nxd8 10.Nxe5 Be6. Although less ambitious than other options, this variation takes the sting out of White's attack by returning the gambit pawn and exchanging queens, and according to Fine, "is psychologically depressing for the gambit player" whose intent is usually an aggressive attack. Mikhail Chigorin analysed the alternative 9.Qb3 Qf6 10.Bg5 Qg6 11.Bd5 Nge7 12.Bxe7 Kxe7 13.Bxc6 Qxc6 14.Nxe5 Qe6, which avoids the exchange of queens, but reached no clear verdict.

==== Tartakower Attack: 7.Qb3 ====
This line is the most frequent and avoids the Lasker Defence. As in other lines with Qb3, Black must defend the pawn or else allow a later Bxf7+.

Position: a8 black rook, c8 black bishop, e8 black king, g8 black knight, h8 black rook, a7 black pawn, b7 black pawn, c7 black pawn, d7 black queen, f7 black pawn, g7 black pawn, h7 black pawn, c6 black knight, d6 black pawn, a5 black bishop, e5 black pawn, c4 white bishop, d4 white pawn, e4 white pawn, b3 white queen, c3 white pawn, f3 white knight, a2 white pawn, f2 white pawn, g2 white pawn, h2 white pawn, a1 white rook, b1 white knight, c1 white bishop, e1 white king, h1 white rook

Tartakower Attack, main line: 7.Qb3 Qd7

Black's most common response is 7...Qd7. The weaker 7...Qe7 permits 8.d5, forcing the awkward move 8...Nd4, but following 7...Qd7, 8...Ne7 can be played instead. 7...Nh6 does not effectively defend the pawn either as White can simply play 8.Bxh6. Following 7...Qd7, White most often plays 8.dxe5, 8.0-0, or 8.Nbd2. Following any of these, Black can return the pawn with 8...Bb6 or hold onto it with 8...dxe5, though White obtains sufficient compensation in lines following this move.

==== Other lines ====
Following 7.0-0, Black has several alternative moves. 7...Bd7 is known as the Sanders–Alapin Defence. It is regarded as solid. 7.0-0 exd4 transposes to the main line with 6...exd4. 7...Bg4 and 7...Nf6 are also seen. Additionally, 7.dxe5 is a lesser seen alternative for White.

=== Other lines ===
Position: a8 black rook, c8 black bishop, d8 black queen, f8 black rook, g8 black king, a7 black pawn, b7 black pawn, c7 black pawn, d7 black pawn, f7 black pawn, g7 black pawn, h7 black pawn, c6 black knight, f6 black knight, a5 black bishop, e5 white knight, c4 white bishop, d4 white pawn, e4 white pawn, c3 white pawn, a2 white pawn, f2 white pawn, g2 white pawn, h2 white pawn, a1 white rook, b1 white knight, c1 white bishop, d1 white queen, f1 white rook, g1 white king

Richardson Attack: 6.0-0 Nf6 7.d4 0-0 8.Nxe5
- 6.0-0, the Slow Variation, is a notable alternative for White, though 6.d4 is significantly more common. Black most often plays 6...Nf6 or 6...d6. The latter usually transposes to the 6.d4 d6 line after 7.d4, but the former features notable independent lines. For example, 6...Nf6 7.d4 0-0 8.Nxe5 is dubbed the Richardson Attack.
- 6.Qb3, a move usually delayed by at least another move by White, is a playable sideline. Black most often defends against the battery with 6...Qe7. Following this, White usually plays 7.d4 or 7.0-0. Black may then play 7...exd4 to transpose to the main line with 6...exd4, but 7...Nf6 is more challenging for White. An alternative for Black is 6...Qf6, which can also transpose. 6...Nh6 is possible but rare.
- 6.d4 b5 is the Leonhardt Countergambit, which most often continues 7.Bxb5 Nxd4 8.Nxd4 exd4, followed by either 9.Qxd4 or 9.0-0.

== 4...Bxb4 5.c3 Bc5 ==
5...Bc5 is often played by those unfamiliar with the Evans Gambit, and is regarded as inferior to 5...Ba5 and 5...Be7, because 6.d4 (the usual next move) attacks the bishop again, gaining tempo, and Black's options are limited compared to 5...Ba5.

=== Normal Position: 6.d4 exd4 7.0-0 d6 8.cxd4 Bb6 ===
Position: a8 black rook, c8 black bishop, d8 black queen, e8 black king, g8 black knight, h8 black rook, a7 black pawn, b7 black pawn, c7 black pawn, f7 black pawn, g7 black pawn, h7 black pawn, b6 black bishop, c6 black knight, d6 black pawn, c4 white bishop, d4 white pawn, e4 white pawn, f3 white knight, a2 white pawn, f2 white pawn, g2 white pawn, h2 white pawn, a1 white rook, b1 white knight, c1 white bishop, d1 white queen, f1 white rook, g1 white king

Normal Position: 6.d4 exd4 7.0-0 d6 8.cxd4 Bb6

The Normal Position is the main line after 4...Bc5, and can be reached by various other move orders, and in fact is more often reached from 5...Ba5 lines. It has frequently been played ever since the 1834 La Bourdonnais–McDonnell matches. It was very common in the 19th century but is not as well regarded in the present. Black is content to settle for a one-pawn advantage and White seeks compensation in the form of open lines and strong central pawns.

Other possible move orders include 6.d4 exd4 7.cxd4 Bb6 8.0-0 d6, and as mentioned earlier, from the main line of the gambit via 5...Ba5 6.d4 exd4 7.0-0 d6 8.cxd4 Bb6. Comparably to in the main line, Black avoids playing 7...dxc3 because of threats such as 8.Bxf7+ Kxf7 9.Qd5+ Kf8 (or 9...Ke8) 10.Qxc5+ d6 11.Qxc3.

9.d5 and 9.Nc3 are the most common next moves for White. In response to the former, Black usually plays 9...Na5.

Position: a8 black rook, c8 black bishop, d8 black queen, f8 black rook, g8 black king, a7 black pawn, b7 black pawn, c7 black pawn, f7 black pawn, g7 black pawn, h7 black pawn, b6 black bishop, d6 black pawn, g6 black knight, a5 black knight, d5 white pawn, e4 white pawn, d3 white bishop, f3 white knight, a2 white pawn, b2 white bishop, e2 white knight, f2 white pawn, g2 white pawn, h2 white pawn, a1 white rook, d1 white queen, f1 white rook, g1 white king

Ulvestad Variation, main line: 9.d5 Na5 10.Bb2 Ne7 11.Bd3 0-0 12.Nc3 Ng6 13.Ne2

White often plays 10.Bb2, known as the Ulvestad Variation, which frequently continues 10...Ne7 (or 10...Nf6; 10...Nxc4 allows 11.Bxg7, dooming Black's rook on h8; 10...f6 is playable but not well regarded for Black) 11.Bd3 0-0 12.Nc3 Ng6 13.Ne2.

Following 9.Nc3, the Morphy Attack, preferred by Mikhail Chigorin and Paul Morphy, the usual continuations are 9...Na5 10.Bg5, the Göring Attack, and 9...Bg4 10.Qa4, the Fraser Attack.

==== Göring Attack: 9.Nc3 Na5 10.Bg5 ====
Position: a8 black rook, c8 black bishop, d8 black queen, e8 black king, g8 black knight, h8 black rook, a7 black pawn, b7 black pawn, c7 black pawn, f7 black pawn, g7 black pawn, h7 black pawn, b6 black bishop, d6 black pawn, a5 black knight, g5 white bishop, c4 white bishop, d4 white pawn, e4 white pawn, c3 white knight, f3 white knight, a2 white pawn, f2 white pawn, g2 white pawn, h2 white pawn, a1 white rook, d1 white queen, f1 white rook, g1 white king

Göring Attack: 9.Nc3 Na5 10.Bg5

This line is named after Carl Theodor Göring, who played it in several games against Johannes Minckwitz in 1869. The Göring Attack came into fashion after Mikhail Chigorin played it against Wilhelm Steinitz in 1883, and scored brilliant successes with it. Modern Chess Openings describes it as a "tricky" opening, "which can be refuted only if you know the right moves".

=== Other lines ===
White can also play 7.Ng5 after 6.d4 exd4. The usual continuation is 7...Nh6 8.Nxf7 Nxf7 9.Bxf7 Kxf7 10.Qh5+, forking Black's king and bishop on c5. Black can then gain the initiative by chasing White's queen (though Black's king is weak), so the line is not well regarded.

White also has the option of 7.cxd4 after 6.d4 exd4, which may transpose to the main lines with 7...Bb6, or Black may opt to play 7...Bb4+ instead, most often continuing 8.Nbd2 or 8.Kf1.

Also playable for Black after 6.d4 is 6...Bb6, but White is regarded as having a small advantage following 7.Nxe5 Nxe5 8.dxe5 Ne7, where Black's position is quite cramped, though White has a poor pawn structure.

== 4...Bxb4 5.c3 Be7 ==
5...Be7, the Anderssen Variation, is a safe and practical alternative to 5...Ba5. It has been played by Viswanathan Anand. After 6.d4 Na5, White can attempt to maintain an initiative with 7.Be2 or 7.Bd3. The line 7.Be2 exd4 8.Qxd4 was popularised by Garry Kasparov, who is credited with revitalising 7.Be2. Alternatively, White can immediately recapture the pawn with 7.Nxe5 Nxc4 8.Nxc4, when White has a strong center but has given up the bishop pair. Another line is 6.Qb3 Nh6 7.d4 Na5.

== Evans Gambit Accepted, other lines ==
- 5...Bd6 is the Stone–Ware Variation, named after Henry Nathan Stone and Preston Ware. It reinforces the pawn on e5 but blocks Black's pawn on d7 from moving. It has been played by several grandmasters such as Andrei Volokitin, Alexander Grischuk and Loek van Wely.
- 5...Bf8 is the Mayet Defence. It is rarely seen as it undevelops Black's bishop.

== Evans Gambit Declined ==
There are various ways to decline the gambit, most often with 4...Bb6. Due to the wasted tempo, most commentators consider declining the Evans Gambit to be weaker than accepting it and returning the pawn at a later stage. Aron Nimzowitsch claimed in his book My System that declining the gambit does not lose a tempo, since b4 is developmentally unproductive, "as is every pawn move, if it does not bear a logical connection with the centre. For suppose after 4...Bb6 5.b5 (to make a virtue of necessity and attempt something of a demobilizing effect with the ill-moved b-pawn move), 5...Nd4 and now if 6.Nxe5, then 6...Qg5 with a strong attack."

Position: a8 black rook, c8 black bishop, d8 black queen, e8 black king, g8 black knight, h8 black rook, b7 black pawn, c7 black pawn, d7 black pawn, f7 black pawn, g7 black pawn, h7 black pawn, a6 black pawn, b6 black bishop, c6 black knight, e5 black pawn, a4 white pawn, b4 white pawn, c4 white bishop, e4 white pawn, c3 white knight, f3 white knight, c2 white pawn, d2 white pawn, f2 white pawn, g2 white pawn, h2 white pawn, a1 white rook, c1 white bishop, d1 white queen, e1 white king, h1 white rook

Showalter Variation: 4...Bb6 5.a4 a6 6.Nc3
- 4...Bb6 5.a4 a6 (5...a5 is an alternative but allows 6.b5, kicking Black's knight) is the most common continuation and often leads to the Showalter Variation (5...a6 6.Nc3). Black usually responds with 6...Nf6 or 6...d6. White seems to have a small advantage with a space advantage on the queenside.
- 4...Bb6 5.b5 Na5 leads to various known lines, such as the Lange Variation (6.Nxe5 Nh6). Black is considered to have an advantage as White's attack is premature.
- 4...Bb6 may also be followed by 5.0-0, 5.c3, and 5.Bb2 (the Cordel Variation).
- 4...d5, counterattacking White's bishop on c4, is the Evans Countergambit.
- 4...Be7 is possible but passive.

== ECO ==
The Encyclopaedia of Chess Openings has two codes for the Evans Gambit, C51 and C52. C52 contains lines beginning 4.b4 Bxb4 5.c3 Ba5, the main line. C51 contains all other lines.

== See also ==
- List of chess openings
- List of chess openings named after people
