= Paris 1867 chess tournament =

Event at the 1867 Paris Exposition

World exhibitions became a new phenomenon in the West in the nineteenth century. Scientific and technical progress were shown. About a dozen World Fairs were organised during the second half of the nineteenth century. Seven times an international invitation chess tournament was part of the event (London 1851, London 1862, Paris 1867, Vienna 1873, Philadelphia 1876, Paris 1878, Paris 1900). The third tournament took place in the Grand Cercle, 10 boulevard Montmartre, Paris, from 4 June to 11 July. Thirteen participants played in a double round-robin tournament. Draws counted as zero. The time control was ten moves an hour.

Compared to modern tournaments, the organization was somewhat haphazard. There were no "rounds" in the modern sense; players simply agreed to play each other when convenient, alternating colours. The convention that draws are counted as a half point to each player was not yet established; they were not counted towards the final result, effectively being treated as a double loss.

The prizes were won by Ignatz von Kolisch (5000 Francs), Szymon Winawer (2500 F), Wilhelm Steinitz (2000 F), Gustav Neumann (1500 F), Cecil Valentine De Vère (1500 F), Jules Arnous de Rivière (1000 F). The first four also got a Sèvres vase.

== Results ==
The results and standings ("d" = draw and counted for zero):

#	Player	1	2	3	4	5	6	7	8	9	10	11	12	13	Wins
1	Ignatz von Kolisch (Hungary)	__	0 1	d 1	0 1	1 1	1 1	1 1	1 1	d 1	1 1	1 1	1 1	1 1	20
2	Szymon Winawer (Poland)	1 0	__	0 1	0 1	1 1	1 1	1 1	1 1	d 1	1 1	1 1	1 1	1 0	19
3	Wilhelm Steinitz (Bohemia)	d 0	1 0	__	d 0	1 1	1 1	1 1	d 1	1 1	1 1	1 1	1 1	1 1	18
4	Gustav Richard Neumann (Prussia)	1 0	1 0	d 1	__	d 1	1 1	1 1	1 d	0 d	1 1	1 1	1 1	1 1	17
5	Cecil Valentine De Vère (United Kingdom)	0 0	0 0	0 0	d 0	__	0 1	1 1	1 1	0 1	1 1	1 1	1 1	1 1	14
6	Jules Arnous de Rivière (France)	0 0	0 0	0 0	0 0	1 0	__	1 0	1 1	1 1	1 1	1 d	0 0	1 1	11
7	Celso Golmayo Zúpide (Spain)	0 0	0 0	0 0	0 0	0 0	0 1	__	0 1	1 1	0 0	1 1	1 1	1 1	10
8	Hieronim Ignacy Czarnowski (France)	0 0	0 0	d 0	0 d	0 0	0 0	1 0	__	1 1	1 1	0 1	1 0	1 1	9
9	Samuel Rosenthal (France)	d 0	d 0	0 0	1 d	1 0	0 0	0 0	0 0	__	0 d	0 0	1 1	1 1	6
10	Samuel Loyd (United States)	0 0	0 0	0 0	0 0	0 0	0 0	1 1	0 0	1 d	__	1 1	0 0	1 0	6
11	Emile d’André (France)	0 0	0 0	0 0	0 0	0 0	0 d	0 0	1 0	1 1	0 0	__	1 1	1 0	6
12	Martin Severin From (Denmark)	0 0	0 0	0 0	0 0	0 0	1 1	0 0	0 1	0 0	1 1	0 0	__	0 0	5
13	Eugène Rousseau (France)	0 0	0 1	0 0	0 0	0 0	0 0	0 0	0 0	0 0	0 1	0 1	1 1	__	5

== Literature ==
Féry d'Esclands, (C. J.) Alphonse (Ch.) "Congrès international des échecs. Compte rendu du congrès de 1867 et des congrès d'échecs antérieurs", Paris, Bertrand, 1868.
