= Hieronim Czarnowski =

Polish chess player and activist

Hieronim Ignacy Czarnowski (January 1834 – 28 December 1902) was a Polish chess master and activist.

He lived in Warsaw (then Russian Empire), where he played, among others, with Alexander Petrov and Szymon Winawer. After the failure of the January Uprising (1863–1864), he emigrated to France.

In 1867, he took 8th in Paris (Ignaz von Kolisch won), and won at Café de la Régence in Paris. He won a match against Préti (+3 –0 =1).

In 1880, he came to Kraków (then Austria-Hungary) in the period of Galician autonomy. He was a co-founder and a president of the Cracovian Chess Club (Krakowski Klub Szachistów) (1893), where he won a championship in 1897.
