= Ludwig Bledow =

German chess master and organizer (1795–1846)

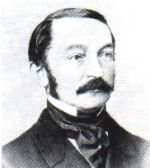
Ludwig Bledow

Dr Ludwig Erdmann Bledow (27 July 1795, Berlin – 6 August 1846, Berlin) was a German chess master and chess organizer (co-founder of the Berlin Pleiades). In 1846 he founded the first German chess magazine, Schachzeitung der Berliner Schachgesellschaft, which would later take the name Deutsche Schachzeitung.

== Influence on the game ==
Several details of the game's moves and competition rules had not yet been universally agreed in Bledow's time, and some were still being debated in 1851. Bledow, influenced by Karl Schorn, agreed that a player should be allowed to have multiple queens (as a result of pawn promotions), so that chess rules in Germany fell in line with the French and English way of playing. He also argued strongly in favour of the touch-move rule.

Bledow wrote a letter to Tassilo von Heydebrand und der Lasa (usually abbreviated as "von der Lasa") proposing that an international tournament should be organized in Trier; the letter was printed in the Deutsche Schachzeitung in 1848, about 2 years after Bledow's death. Bledow intended that the winner of the proposed tournament should be recognized as the world champion: "Next year we will hopefully see each other in Trier, and until then the winner of the battle in Paris should not be overly proud of his special position, since it is in Trier that the crown will first be awarded." ("battle in Paris" means the 1843 match between Howard Staunton and Pierre Charles Fournier de Saint-Amant). News of this may have stimulated Staunton to organize the London 1851 chess tournament, which was in fact the world's first international chess tournament.

In 1851 the surviving members of the Berlin Pleiades nominated Adolf Anderssen to represent Germany at the London 1851 chess tournament. As a result of winning the 1851 tournament Anderssen was widely recognised as the world's strongest player. In fact Hugh A. Kennedy, who played in the tournament and helped to organize it, wrote before the event started that the contest was "for the baton of the World's Chess Champion".

== Playing strength ==
Assessments of Bledow's playing strength have to rely mainly on the comments of his contemporaries, as Bledow seldom recorded the moves in his games. Various sources, including Schachzeitung der Berliner Schachgesellschaft and correspondence by Tassilo von Heydebrand und der Lasa, indicate that Bledow:

- in 1838-1839 won a slight majority of his games against József Szén, who had narrowly beaten Louis-Charles Mahé de La Bourdonnais in a match in 1836, +13-12=0, with de La Bourdonnais giving odds of pawn and two moves.
- won a match against Carl Jaenisch in 1842.
- won the majority of his games against Henry Thomas Buckle. It is particularly unfortunate that Buckle also did not record his games, as detailed information would have made it possible to compare Bledow with leading English players such as Howard Staunton. Buckle was considered England's second strongest player after Staunton; in fact some of Staunton's enemies argued that Buckle was the better player.
- in 1845 beat Adolf Anderssen by either 5-0 or 4½-½, depending on which source is used. At this time Anderssen was 27 years old, and perhaps weaker than he was when he won the 1851 and 1862 London International Tournaments.
- defeated Augustus Mongredien +7 –4 =1, also in 1845. At that time Mongrédien appears to have been a stronger player than he was in the late 1850s and 1860s. In 1845, possibly his best year, Mongrédien drew a match with Carl Mayet, and lost to Staunton by –2=3. Later he failed to win a game in matches against Paul Morphy (1859), Daniel Harrwitz (1860), and Wilhelm Steinitz (1863), and finished 11th out of 14 players in the 1862 London International Tournament (he was not invited to play in the 1851 tournament, possibly because he was on the wrong side in a dispute between some of the London clubs).

This information is insufficient to justify proclaiming Bledow as the strongest player of the mid-1840s, but he would deserve serious consideration as a contender.

An 1860 article in the Atlantic categorizes Bledow as a "closed" player (like François-André Danican Philidor, Staunton, Harrwitz, Slous, Bernhard Horwitz and Szén) rather than a "heroic" player (such as Labourdonnais, Morphy, Anderssen, Carl Mayet, Max Lange, von der Lasa, Serafino Dubois, Saint Amant, Mongredien, Johann Löwenthal and several others). Bledow's surviving games support this to some extent - for example he prefers the Giuoco Piano to the Kings Gambit, and plays the Dutch Defense against 1.d4.

== Notable games ==
- Dr. Ludwig Bledow vs Paul Rudolf von Bilguer (1838)
- Dr. Ludwig Bledow vs Baron Tassilo Heydebrand und der Lasa (1838)
