= Berthold Suhle =

German chess master

Berthold Suhle (1 January 1837, Stolp, Province of Pomerania, now Poland – 26 January 1904, Germany) was a German chess master.

Born in Stolp (Słupsk, then Kingdom of Prussia, now Poland), he studied philosophy, philology and nature in Berlin (1855–1857) and Bonn (1857–1859).

He won a match with Bartolomeo Forlico (11.5 : 9.5) at Venice 1858, lost to Adolf Anderssen (+0 –5 =2) at Cologne 1859 and (+13 –27 =8) in Breslau from April to September 1859, won against Bernhard von Guretzky-Cornitz (+6 –1 =3) at Berlin 1860, drew with Anderssen (+3 –3 =2) at Berlin 1864, and beat Philipp Hirschfeld (+7 –0 =2) at Berlin 1865.

He was an author of Der Schachkongress zu London im Jahre 1862 nebst dem Schachkongresse zu Bristol im Jahre 1861 (Berlin 1864, two parts), and wrote with Gustav Neumann a well-received book on the latest chess theories, Die neueste Theorie und Praxis des Schachspiels seit dem Schachkongress zu New York i.J. 1857. Ein vollständiger Cursus der neuesten Spieleröffnungskunst (Berlin 1865). He also was a co-editor of the Deutsche Schachzeitung. Suhle stopped playing to teach from 1877 to 1901, and was named a professor in 1895.
