= Carl Göring =

German chess player

Carl Theodor Göring (Goering) (28 April 1841 in Brüheim – 2 April 1879 in Eisenach) was a German professor, philosopher and chess master.

In 1870, he took 3rd in the first Austrian Chess Federation Congress, held in Graz (Johann Berger won). In 1871, he took 4th in Krefeld (9th WDSB–Congress, West German Chess Congress, Louis Paulsen won); took 3rd in Leipzig (1st MDSB–Congress, Middle German Chess Congress, Adolf Anderssen won); won in Wiesbaden (Pentagonal); took 4th in Bad Ems (Samuel Mieses won).

He took 3rd at Altona 1872 (3rd NDSB–Congress, North German Chess Congress, Adolf Anderssen won); tied for 2nd at Leipzig 1876 (2nd MDSB–Congress, Middle German Chess Congress, Anderssen won); took 5th at Leipzig 1877 (Louis Paulsen won); took 5th at Cologne 1877 (11th WDSB–Congress, West German Chess Congress, Johannes Zukertort won).

His name is attached to the Göring Gambit in the Scotch Game (1. e4 e5 2. Nf3 Nc6 3. d4 exd4 4. c3), the Göring Attack in the Evans Gambit (commencing 10.Bg5) and the Göring Variant of the Two Knights Game (replying to 10.Ne5 with 10...Qc7 in the 4...d5 main line).

Carl Göring died by suicide.
