= Alexander Berelowitsch =

Ukrainian chess grandmaster (born 1967)

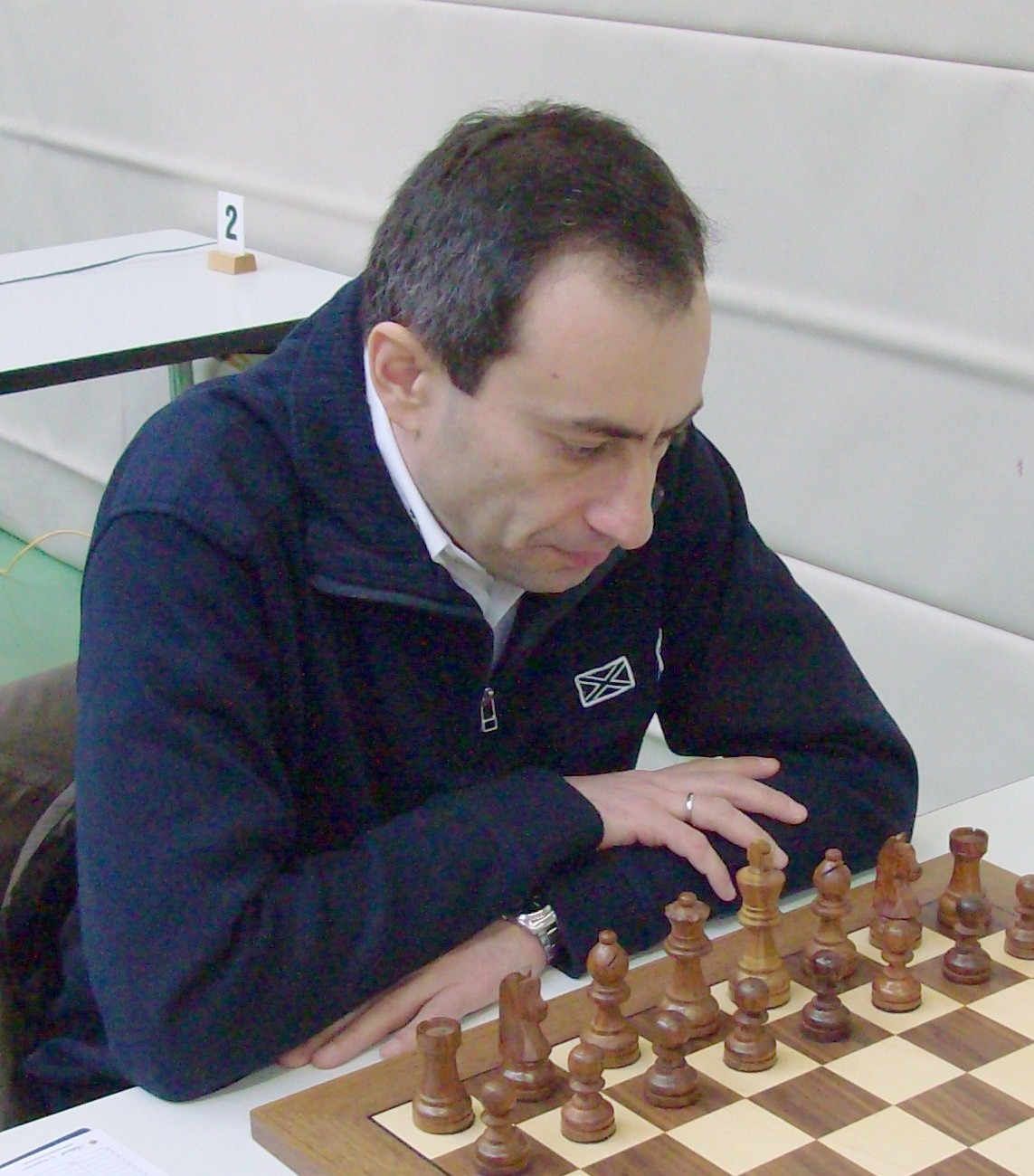

Personal information
- Born: July 2, 1967 (age 59) Kharkiv, Ukraine

Chess career
- Country: Soviet Union → Ukraine (until 2008); Germany (since 2008)
- Title: Grandmaster (1997)
- FIDE rating: 2467 (November 2026)
- Peak rating: 2606 (January 2008)

Alexander Berelowitsch (born July 2, 1967, Kharkiv, Ukraine) is a FIDE trainer living in Germany. He was the International Master (IM) in 1993 and has been a Grandmaster (GM) since 1997. In 2001, he won the Ukrainian championship. He moved to the German Chess Federation in 2008.

== Notable tournaments ==
Tournament Name	Year	ELO	Points
Bundesliga 2018-19 (Dusseldorf GER)	2018	2520	2.5
2nd Bundesliga West (Germany GER)	2017	2522	6.5
Riga Tech Open A (Riga LAT)	2017	2527	4.5
Ukrainian Championship Tournament (Ordzhonikidze)	2001	2513	6.5
