= Albert Clerc =

French chess player (1830–1918)

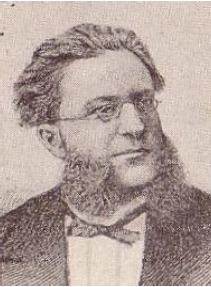

Albert Clerc (June 25, 1830, Besançon – June 10, 1918, Saint-Denis-en-Val) was a French chess master.

== Chess career ==
He won at Paris 1856, tied for 9-10th at Paris 1878 (Johannes Zukertort and Szymon Winawer won), took 2nd, behind Samuel Rosenthal, at Paris 1880 (the first French National Tournament, the 1st unofficial French Chess Championship), took 4th at Paris 1881 (the second French National Tournament, Edward Chamier won), and was a winner, ahead of Jules Arnous de Rivière, at Paris 1883 (the third French National Tournament), took twice 4th at Paris 1890 and 1892 (both won by Alphonse Goetz).
