= Evergreen Game =

Chess game won by Adolf Anderssen against Jean Dufresne in 1852

Game animation

The Evergreen Game is a famous chess game won by Adolf Anderssen against Jean Dufresne in 1852.

This was probably an informal game. At the time, there was no formal title of "World Champion", but the German mathematics professor Anderssen was widely considered the best player in the world after winning the first major international chess tournament in London in 1851. Though not in the same class as Anderssen, Dufresne, a popular author of chess books, was also a strong player. It is usually assumed that the game was played in Berlin, where Dufresne lived and Anderssen often visited, but no details of the game's circumstances were given in the original publication in the September and October 1852 issues of the Berlin-based Deutsche Schachzeitung.

Beginning with Howard Staunton in 1853, the game has been extensively analyzed over the years, particularly the critical positions before and after White's remarkable 19th move, Rad1. Although defensive resources for Black have since been found, Anderssen's combination remains much admired.

After Anderssen's death in 1879, Wilhelm Steinitz published a tribute in The Field in which he annotated Anderssen's two most famous games, the Evergreen and the Immortal Game against Lionel Kieseritzky. Annotating 19.Rad1, Steinitz wrote, "An evergreen in the laurel crown of the departed chess hero", thus giving this game its name.

== The game ==
White: Adolf Anderssen Black: Jean Dufresne Opening: Evans Gambit (ECO C52)

1. e4 e5 2. Nf3 Nc6 3. Bc4 Bc5 4. b4

The Evans Gambit, an opening popular in the 19th century and still occasionally seen today. White gives up material to gain an advantage in development.

4... Bxb4 5. c3 Ba5 6. d4 exd4

A solid alternative, unknown to theory at the time, is 6...d6 7.Qb3 Qd7 8.0-0 Bb6 with the idea of ...Na5, driving White's bishop off the dangerous a2–g8 diagonal. (Spielmann–Salwe, Vienna 1908)

Position: a8 black rook, c8 black bishop, d8 black queen, e8 black king, g8 black knight, h8 black rook, a7 black pawn, b7 black pawn, c7 black pawn, d7 black pawn, f7 black pawn, g7 black pawn, h7 black pawn, c6 black knight, a5 black bishop, c4 white bishop, e4 white pawn, c3 white pawn, d3 black pawn, f3 white knight, a2 white pawn, f2 white pawn, g2 white pawn, h2 white pawn, a1 white rook, b1 white knight, c1 white bishop, d1 white queen, f1 white rook, g1 white king

Position after 7...d3

7. 0-0 d3 (diagram)

Black attempts to slow White's rapid development by depriving the queen's knight of its preferred c3-square and forcing White to spend a tempo capturing the pawn. This move was favored by Dufresne, but is today considered inferior. Most popular today is 7...Nge7, in order to answer 8.cxd4 or 8.Ng5 with 8...d5. Other alternatives include 7...dxc3 (the risky "Compromised Defense"), 7...Nf6, and 7...d6.

8. Qb3

Immediately attacking the f7-pawn. FIDE Master Graham Burgess suggests 8.Re1 instead.

8... Qf6 9. e5 Qg6

White's e5-pawn cannot be taken: if 9...Nxe5, then 10.Re1 d6 11.Bg5, when 11...Qf5 (11...Qg6 12.Nxe5 dxe5 13.Rxe5+ wins the bishop) 12.Nxe5 wins the knight (if the knight is recaptured with 12...dxe5, then 13.Qb5+ followed by 14.Rxe5+ wins).

Position: a8 black rook, c8 black bishop, e8 black king, g8 black knight, h8 black rook, a7 black pawn, b7 black pawn, c7 black pawn, d7 black pawn, f7 black pawn, g7 black pawn, h7 black pawn, c6 black knight, g6 black queen, a5 black bishop, e5 white pawn, c4 white bishop, b3 white queen, c3 white pawn, d3 black pawn, f3 white knight, a2 white pawn, f2 white pawn, g2 white pawn, h2 white pawn, a1 white rook, b1 white knight, c1 white bishop, e1 white rook, g1 white king

Position after 10.Re1

10. Re1 (diagram)

In his 2023 book Re-Engineering the Chess Classics, in which he analyzes 35 classic chess games with the aid of modern chess engines, Grandmaster Matthew Sadler criticizes this move, preferring 10.Rd1, with the idea of regaining the pawn after the inevitable ...d6.

10... Nge7 11. Ba3

Consistent with the previous move, but 11.Qd1 and 11.Re3, eliminating the d3-pawn, are preferred by engines.

11... b5?

Rather than defending his own position, Black offers a counter-sacrifice to activate his a8-rook with tempo. Sadler considers that White should be "somewhat worse" after 11...d5 12.exd6 cxd6 13.Re3 0-0 14.Bxd3 Qh6 15.Nbd2 Be6. Burgess suggests 11...a6, to allow the b-pawn to advance later with tempo.

12. Qxb5 Rb8 13. Qa4 Bb6

Black cannot castle because 14.Bxe7 would win a piece, as the knight on c6 cannot simultaneously protect the knight on e7 and the bishop on a5.

14. Nbd2 Bb7?

Black must castle without delay.

15. Ne4 Qf5?

A poor move that loses a tempo. 15...0-0 16.Bxd3 also gives White a very dangerous attack (Neishtadt, 1961). Better was 15...d2! 16.Nexd2 0-0 (Lasker), although White still has a clear advantage.

16. Bxd3 Qh5 17. Nf6+?

A dramatic sacrifice, but this move is objectively bad, turning a won position into an equal one. 17.Ng3 Qh6 18.Bc1 Qe6 19.Bc4 wins material in a simpler way. 18.Nf5 is also winning.

Position: b8 black rook, e8 black king, g8 black rook, a7 black pawn, b7 black bishop, c7 black pawn, d7 black pawn, e7 black knight, f7 black pawn, h7 black pawn, b6 black bishop, c6 black knight, f6 white pawn, h5 black queen, a4 white queen, a3 white bishop, c3 white pawn, d3 white bishop, f3 white knight, a2 white pawn, f2 white pawn, g2 white pawn, h2 white pawn, d1 white rook, e1 white rook, g1 white king

Position after 19.Rad1!

17... gxf6 18. exf6 Rg8 19. Rad1! (diagram)

A somewhat controversial move, which has been both exulted and criticized over the years. It sets a deep trap, which Black walks into. In Common Sense in Chess (1895), the then-world champion Emanuel Lasker praised it as "one of the most subtle and profound moves on record". However, probably influenced by the analysis of the German master Paul Lipke which revealed defensive possibilities for Black, he later criticized the move, saying that 19.Be4 would have won relatively easily. Lasker's analysis turned out to be faulty, however. Analysis by Jacob Murey and German Fridshtein published in the Soviet magazine 64 in 1975 found that after 19.Be4 Qh3! 20.g3 Rxg3+ 21.hxg3 Qxg3+ 22.Kh1 Bxf2 23.Bxe7! (Lasker's 23.Re2? is refuted by 23...Nd4!) 23...Qh3+! 24.Nh2 Bxe1 25.Rxe1 Qh4! 26.Qd1! Nxe7 27.Bxb7 Qxf6 the game will likely end in a draw. Subsequent analysts such as Zaitsev and Kasparov have agreed with this assessment.

19... Qxf3?

"Who would have played anything else here?!" (Lipke, 1898). White cannot play 20.gxf3 since the g2-pawn is pinned by the rook on g8. Black now threatens to take either on f2 or g2, both major threats to the white king, but Anderssen has a shattering resource available.
Dissatisfied with the lack of analysis in the game's original publication, Howard Staunton published a detailed analysis of several of Black's alternatives in the Chess Player's Chronicle in 1853. Staunton analyzed 19...Ne5, 19...d6, 19...Bc5, 19...Rxg2+, and 19...Qh3, concluding that Black was lost in all lines.
This was the accepted view for many years, until Paul Lipke published analysis in the May and June 1898 issues of the Deutsche Schachzeitung. Lipke recommended 19...Rg4!? for Black, concluding that it offered Black excellent drawing chances with best play. Lipke's main line went 19...Rg4 20.Bc4 Qf5! 21.Rxd7! Kxd7 22.Ne5+ Kc8 23.Nxg4 Nd5 24.Qd1 Nd8 25.Re5 Bxf2+ 26.Kh1 Nf4 27.h3 and now either 27...Qb1 or 27...Nxg2 will probably draw for Black. Analysis published in the early 1930s by O. Hoppe and H. Heckner found a win for White after 25.Bd3! (instead of 25.Re5), but Black can also improve with 24...Nxf6 (Kasparov). Zaitsev's 21...Rxg2+ (rather than 21...Kxd7) also appears to be sufficient for a draw. Hoppe and Heckner also found a win for White after 20.c4 Rf4? (Lipke) 21.Bg6!!. Better is 20...Bd4 (Zaitsev, 64, 1976) or 20...Rxg2+! (Kasparov). 20.Re4 has also received renewed attention as an attempt for White to gain the advantage. The final assessment of 19...Rg4 remains unclear; according to Burgess in the 2021 edition of The Mammoth Book of the World's Greatest Chess Games, White has a slightly better endgame after 20.Re4 Rxe4 21.Qxe4 d6 22.Re1 Qg6! 23.Qxc6+ Bxc6 24.Rxe7+ Kf8 25.Bxg6 hxg6 26.Ne5! Be8.
Most analysts have followed Staunton in rejecting 19...Rxg2+?! on account of 20.Kxg2 Ne5 21.Qxd7+!!, but I.J. Good contended that after 21...Kxd7 22.Bg6+ Ke6 23.Bxh5 Rg8+ 24.Kh3! N7g6 25.Bg4+ Kxf6 26.Nxe5 Nxe5 27.Be7+ Kxe7 28.Rxe5+ Kf6 White does not have a clear win in the endgame.
In 1958, analysis by readers of the Schach-Echo came to the conclusion that 19...Bd4 and 19...Qh3 are even better than 19...Rg4 and sufficient to force a draw. (19...Bd4 was also found independently by Zaitsev.) This view is endorsed by Burgess, who quotes the lines (a) 19...Bd4 20.cxd4 Qxf3 21.Be4 Rxg2+ 22.Kh1 Rxh2+ 23.Kxh2 Qxf2+ and (b) 19...Qh3 20.Bf1 Qf5! (not analyzed by Staunton) 21.Bd3 Qh3, repeating moves in each case.

20. Rxe7+! Nxe7?

This loses instantly to a very attractive mate in four. 20...Kd8 would put up more resistance, but White should still win after 21.Rxd7+ Kc8 22.Rd8+!! Kxd8 (if 22...Rxd8 23.gxf3; if 22...Nxd8 23.Qd7+ Kxd7 24.Bf5+ Ke8 25.Bd7#) (Staunton, 1853) 23.Bf5+ Qxd1+ (Rubinstein, 1921). Another way is 23.Be2+, but White must play accurately: 23...Nd4! 24.Bxf3 Bxf3 25.Rxd4+? leads to a probable draw after 25...Bxd4 26.Qxd4+ Kc8 27.Qd3 Bxg2 28.f3 Bh3+ 29.Kf2 Rb6 30.Qxh7 Rg2+ 31.Ke3 Be6 (Levenfish, 1959). White must instead play 25.g3! (Neishtadt, 1961) Bxd1 26.Qxd1 "with a boring but winning endgame" (Kasparov).
It is unclear whether the following moves were actually played, or whether Anderssen simply "announced mate", a common practice at the time. The Deutsche Schachzeitung where the game was originally published simply said "White mates in 4 moves", without providing the actual moves.

21. Qxd7+!! Kxd7 22. Bf5+

A decisive double check which forces the king to move, despite both checking pieces being en prise.

22... Ke8

Or 22...Kc6 23.Bd7#.

23. Bd7+ Kf8

Some sources give 23...Kd8 as Black's move, with the same reply.

24. Bxe7# 1–0

Position: b8 black rook, f8 black king, g8 black rook, a7 black pawn, b7 black bishop, c7 black pawn, d7 white bishop, e7 white bishop, f7 black pawn, h7 black pawn, b6 black bishop, f6 white pawn, c3 white pawn, f3 black queen, a2 white pawn, f2 white pawn, g2 white pawn, h2 white pawn, d1 white rook, g1 white king

Final position after 24.Bxe7# (a pure mate)

Savielly Tartakower commented, "A combination second to none in the literature of the game."

== See also ==
- Immortal Game – also won by Anderssen
- List of chess games
