= Paris 1878 chess tournament =

Event at the 1878 Universal Exposition

The Paris 1878 chess tournament took place from 17 June to 31 July 1878 during the Paris World Expo. The participation of George Henry Mackenzie and James Mason made it the first intercontinental tournament in Europe. Eleven double rounds were played. Wilhelm Steinitz was present as reporter for The Field.

First place was shared by Szymon Winawer and Johannes Hermann Zukertort, who had a play-off to decide the winner. They drew twice, so another play-off was necessary. Zukertort won both games and was awarded first prize. Mackenzie defeated Henry Edward Bird twice in the play-off for the fourth place.

The win of Zukertort, and non-participation of Steinitz, led to some suggestion that Zukertort should be called World Chess Champion.

Winners of the prizes were: Zukertort (1000 Frans + two Sèvres vases), Winawer (500 F + one vase), Joseph Henry Blackburne (1500 F), Mackenzie (1000 F), Bird (500 F), and Adolf Anderssen (200 F). Anderssen was in poor health and died the next year.

The results and standings:

#	Player	1	2	3	4	5	6	7	8	9	10	11	12	Total
1	Szymon Winawer (Poland)	x	1 0	½ ½	0 ½	1 1	½ 1	0 1	1 1	½ 1	1 1	1 1	1 1	16.5
2	Johannes Zukertort (German Empire)	0 1	x	1 0	½ 0	1 1	1 ½	½ ½	1 1	1 1	½ 1	1 1	1 1	16.5
3	Joseph Henry Blackburne (United Kingdom)	½ ½	0 1	x	0 1	1 0	0 0	1 ½	1 ½	1 1	1 ½	1 1	1 1	14.5
4	George Henry Mackenzie (United States)	1 ½	½ 1	1 0	x	0 1	0 0	0 1	½ 0	0 1	1 1	1 1	1 ½	13.0
5	Henry Edward Bird (United Kingdom)	0 0	0 0	0 1	1 0	x	1 1	1 0	1 0	0 1	1 1	1 1	1 1	13.0
6	Adolf Anderssen (German Empire)	½ 0	0 ½	1 1	1 1	0 0	x	1 0	0 ½	1 1	1 0	1 0	1 1	12.5
7	Berthold Englisch (Austria-Hungary)	1 0	½ ½	0 ½	1 0	0 1	0 1	x	½ ½	0 1	½ ½	1 1	1 0	11.5
8	Samuel Rosenthal (France)	0 0	0 0	0 ½	½ 1	0 1	1 ½	½ ½	x	0 1	1 0	1 1	1 1	11.5
9	Albert Clerc (France)	½ 0	0 0	0 0	1 0	1 0	0 0	1 0	1 0	x	0 1	1 0	1 1	8.5
10	James Mason (United States)	0 0	½ 0	0 ½	0 0	0 0	0 1	½ ½	0 1	1 0	x	1 1	1 ½	8.5
11	H.W.B. Gifford (Netherlands)	0 0	0 0	0 0	0 0	0 0	0 1	0 0	0 0	0 1	0 0	x	1 ½	3.5
12	Karl Pitschel (Austria-Hungary)	0 0	0 0	0 0	0 ½	0 0	0 0	0 1	0 0	0 0	0 ½	0 ½	x	2.5
