= Samuel Rosenthal =

Polish-French chess player (1837–1902)

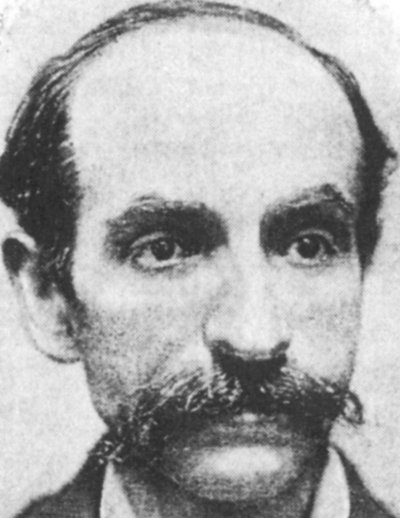
- Born: 7 September 1837; Suwałki, Congress Poland, Russian Empire
- Died: 12 September 1902 (aged 65); Neuilly-sur-Seine, France
- Occupation: Chess player

Samuel Rosenthal (7 September 1837 – 12 September 1902) was a Polish-born French chess player. Chess historian Edward Winter wrote, "He dedicated his life to chess-playing, touring, writing, teaching and analysing. Despite only occasional participation in first-class events, he scored victories over all the leading masters of the time (Anderssen, Blackburne, Chigorin, Mackenzie, Mason, Paulsen, Steinitz and Zukertort). He also acquired world renown as an unassuming showman who gave large simultaneous displays and blindfold séances, invariably producing a cluster of glittering moves."

Rosenthal became a law student and moved from Warsaw to Paris, during the Polish revolution in 1864, after the failure of the January Uprising. He settled in Paris as a chess professional and writer. In 1864, he lost a match to Ignatz von Kolisch (+1−7=0) in Paris. Rosenthal won the Café de la Régence championship in 1865, 1866, and 1867 in Paris, and became the strongest French chess player. In 1867, he came ninth in the Paris tournament (von Kolisch won), and lost a match to Gustav Neumann (+0−5=6) in Paris. In 1869, he lost two matches to Neumann (+1−3=1) and (+2−4=1). In July 1870, he tied for 8–9th places in Baden-Baden. The event was won by Adolf Anderssen.

Because of the Franco Prussian War in 1870–71, Rosenthal moved to London. In 1870–71, he won a match against John Wisker (+3−2=4).

In July–August 1873, Rosenthal took fourth place, behind Wilhelm Steinitz, Joseph Henry Blackburne, and Anderssen, in Vienna. In 1878, he tied for 7–8th in Paris (Johannes Zukertort and Szymon Winawer won). In 1880, he won in Paris the first unofficial French Chess Championship (ahead of Albert Clerc and Jules Arnous de Rivière). In 1880, he lost a match against Zukertort (+1−7=11) in London. In 1883, he took 8th in London (Zukertort won).

His results were affected by his journalistic activities and bad health.

From 1885 to 1902, he edited a chess column for the Le Monde Illustré, and also wrote for La Strategie, La Vie Moderne, and other French newspapers. The American writers David Shenk and Joshua Wolf Shenk are descendants of Samuel Rosenthal.

== Notable chess games ==
- Cecil De Vere vs Samuel Rosenthal, Paris 1867, English Opening, King's English Variation, A20, 0–1
- Adolf Anderssen vs Samuel Rosenthal, Baden-Baden 1870, Italian Game, Evans Gambit, C51, 0–1
- Joseph Henry Blackburne vs Samuel Rosenthal, Queen's Gambit Accepted, Traditional System, Vienna 1873, D37, 0–1
- Samuel Rosenthal vs Henry Bird, Paris 1878, French Defense, C00, 1–0
- Wilhelm Steinitz vs Samuel Rosenthal, London 1883, Ruy Lopez, Berlin Defense, C65, 0–1
- Szymon Winawer vs Samuel Rosenthal, London 1883, Bishop's Opening, Boi Variation, C23, 0–1

== See also ==
- List of Jewish chess players
