= Adolf Stern (chess player) =

German chess player

Adolf Stern (25 December 1849, Grünstadt, Rhineland-Palatinate – 24 August 1907, Mannheim) was a German chess master.

Born into a merchant Jewish family, he was the second child of Jacob Stern and Babette Caroline. At the beginning of his chess career, he participated in Baden-Baden 1870 chess tournament, playing only four games (scoring 1½/4) because of Franco-Prussian War (as a Bavarian reservist, he fought in the war). In August 1871 he played in Wiesbaden (section I) scoring 3/4. In September 1871 he took second place, behind Samuel Mieses, in Bad Ems. In July/August 1878 he took ninth in Frankfurt (the 12th WDSB–Kongress, Louis Paulsen won).

== Literature ==
- Stefan Haas: Das Schachturnier Baden-Baden 1870, der unbekannte Schachmeister Adolf Stern. Rattmann, Ludwigshafen 2006. ISBN 3-88086-190-0
