= Leon Rosen =

American chess master (1869–1942)

Leon Rosen (March 1869 in Warsaw – 16 August 1942 in New York City) was an American chess master.

Born in Warsaw, Poland (then Russian Empire), he left for Paris, France, and next emigrated to the United States. He took 4th at Paris 1896 (Dawid Janowski won), and took 14th in the Paris 1900 chess tournament (Emanuel Lasker won). In that time, he appeared on the 1900 New York Census. He took 18th at Excelsior 1905 (U.S. Open Chess Championship, Edward F. Schrader won), took 2nd, after Julius Finn, in the 1907 New York State championship, took 2nd, behind Clarence S. Howell, at Trenton Falls 1908 (Quadrangular). In 1909, he shared 1st with Manuel Ayala and Otto Roething in the Manhattan CC championship. In January 1910, Rosen, the Parisian expert, beat José Raúl Capablanca (third round), Jacob Rosenthal (semi-final), and J. Marder (final), and won in the Rice Chess Club tournament in New York.

Rosen played in several matches in New York: Manhattan CC vs. Franklin CC (1909), Rice CC vs. Brooklyn CC (1909), Brooklyn CC vs. Rice CC (1909), Manhattan CC vs. Franklin CC (1910, 1911, 1912). He participated in American Chess Bulletin tournament in 1914/15, and in the 1923 New York Metropolitan team tournament.
