= Carl Mayet =

German chess player

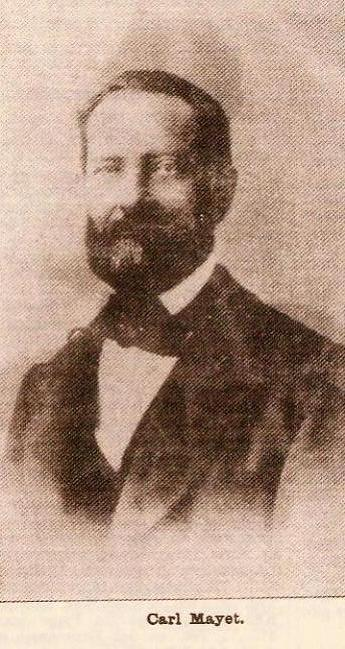
Carl Mayet during the 1850s or 1860s

Carl (Karl) Mayet (11 August 1810, Berlin – 18 May 1868, Stettin, now Szczecin) was a German chess master. He was one of the most original of the Berlin Pleiades (the seven stars of German chess).

In 1839, Mayet defeated Jozsef Szen in a match with (+3−2=1). In 1845, he drew a match with Augustus Mongredien with (+3−3). In 1847, he defeated A. von der Goltz in a match (+14−9=1), but then lost a match with his cousin Wilhelm Hanstein (+5−12=1). In 1848, he lost a match to Daniel Harrwitz (+2−5=2). In the London 1851 chess tournament, he was knocked out in round 1 when he lost to Hugh Alexander Kennedy with two losses. In 1851, he lost a match to Adolf Anderssen in Berlin with four losses. In 1852, he lost a match to Frederick Deacon (2–5).

In 1853, he took third place in the first unofficial Berlin Championship, behind Jean Dufresne and Max Lange. In 1853, he lost a match to Dufresne (+5−7). In 1855, he lost to Anderssen (+6−14=1). In 1856, he lost to T. Wiegelmann (2–4) in the 1856 Berlin Knockout Tournament. In 1859, he lost a match to Anderssen (+1−7). In 1865, he lost a match to Anderssen (+2−5=1). In 1866, he lost a match to Gustav Neumann (−6=1).
