= Vienna 1873 chess tournament =

Event at the 1873 Vienna World's Fair

The Vienna 1873 chess tournament was a side event of the world exhibition of 1873 (the fifth since the first Great Exhibition in London in 1851).

== Background ==
The fair was held in the Prater in Vienna, and opened in the Rotunde on May 1. Companies of all 35 participating countries presented their state of the art products and inventions. The world exhibitions aimed to promote international trading relations and to propagate the technical and cultural progress. Through this tournament, Austria-Hungary aimed to present itself as a world leader and the equal of England and France.

== The Chess tournament ==
During the exhibition, the tournament took place in the rooms of the Wiener Schachgesellschaft from June 21 to August 29. The time limit was twenty moves per hour. It was a twelve player tournament. Each participant played every other for a match for two points with a maximum of three games. There were eleven rounds of match competitions. Every short match had to be ended within two days. If the overall score gave no winner (1:1,=1 or 0:0,=3), the result was drawn with a half point given to each player. Wilhelm Steinitz won the tournament after a play-off with Joseph Henry Blackburne (2–0). Almost everyone now conceded that Steinitz was the strongest chess player in the world.

Emperor Franz Josef I of Austria, Baron Albert Salomon von Rothschild and Baron Ignaz von Kolisch contributed large sums to the prize fund.

The results and standings:

#	Player	1	2	3	4	5	6	7	8	9	10	11	12	Total	Final Total
1	Joseph Henry Blackburne (United Kingdom)	x	1 1 ½	1 0 1	0 0 ½	1 1 0	1 1	1 1	1 1 0	1 1	1 1 0	1 ½ 1	0 1 1	21.5	10.0
2	Wilhelm Steinitz (Bohemia)	0 0 ½	x	1 1	1 1	1 1	1 1	1 1	½ ½ 1	½ ½ 1	1 1	1 1	1 1	20.5	10.0
3	Adolf Anderssen (German Empire)	0 1 0	0 0	x	1 0 1	1 1	1 0 1	1 0 1	0 ½ 1	½ 1 ½	1 1 0	1 1	1 ½ 1	19.0	8.5
4	Samuel Rosenthal (France)	1 1 ½	0 0	0 1 0	x	0 ½ 1	0 0	1 1 0	1 1	1 1	1 1	0 1 1	1 1	17.0	7.5
5	Louis Paulsen (German Empire)	0 0 1	0 0	0 0	1 ½ 0	x	1 1	0 ½ 1	1 1	1 ½ 1	1 ½ 0	1 1	1 1	16.0	6.5
6	Henry Edward Bird (United Kingdom)	0 0	0 0	0 1 0	1 1	0 0	x	1 0 ½	1 1	1 1	1 1	1 1	1 1	14.5	6.5
7	Josef Heral (Austria)	0 0	0 0	0 1 0	0 0 1	1 ½ 0	0 1 ½	x	½ 1 0	0 1 ½	1 0 ½	½ 1 0	0 0 1	12.0	3.0
8	Max Fleissig (Hungary)	0 0 1	½ ½ 0	1 ½ 0	0 0	0 0	0 0	½ 0 1	x	1 0 1	0 1 ½	0 1 0	1 1	11.5	3.5
9	Philipp Meitner (Austria)	0 0	½ ½ 0	½ 0 ½	0 0	0 ½ 0	0 0	1 0 ½	0 1 0	x	½ 1 1	1 ½ ½	1 1	11.5	3.5
10	Adolf Schwarz (Hungary)	0 0 1	0 0	0 0 1	0 0	0 ½ 1	0 0	0 1 ½	1 0 ½	½ 0 0	x	½ ½ ½	1 ½ ½	10.5	3.0
11	Oscar Gelbfuhs (Austria)	0 ½ 0	0 0	0 0	1 0 0	0 0	0 0	½ 0 1	1 0 1	0 ½ ½	½ ½ ½	x	½ 1 1	10.0	3.0
12	Karl Pitschel (Austria)	1 0 0	0 0	0 ½ 0	0 0	0 0	0 0	1 1 0	0 0	0 0	0 ½ ½	½ 0 0	x	5.0	1.0

== Literature ==
Lehner, Hermann; Schwede, Constantin "Der Erste Wiener Internationale Schachkongreß im Jahre 1873", Verlag von Veit & Comp., Leipzig, 1874
