= Wilhelm Hanstein =

German chess player (1811–1850)

Wilhelm Hanstein (3 August 1811 in Berlin – 14 October 1850 in Magdeburg) was a German chess player and writer. He was also a civil servant.

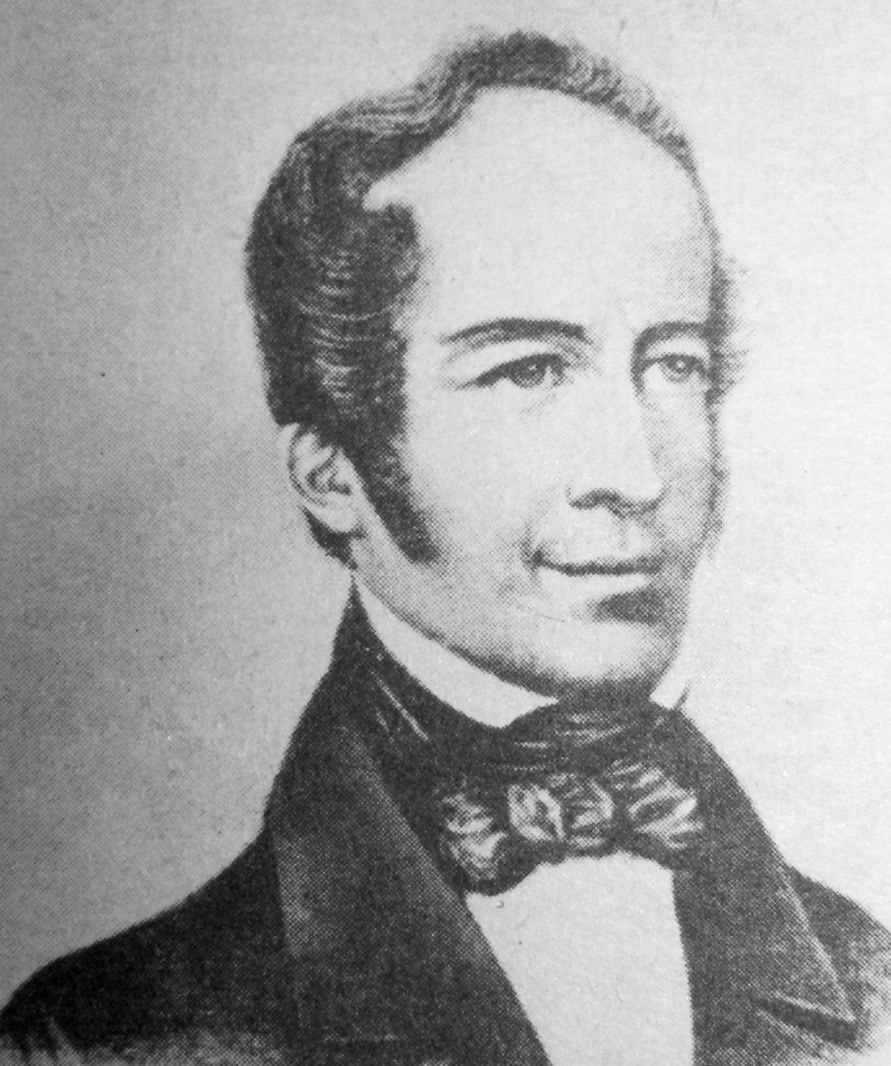
Wilhelm Hanstein

Hanstein was one of the Berlin Pleiades. He helped found Berliner Schachzeitung, later to become Deutsche Schachzeitung. In 1842, he won a match against Carl Jaenisch (+4 −1 =1). In 1847, he won a match against Karl Mayet (+12 −5 =1).
