= Samuel Mieses =

German chess player

Samuel Mieses (November 1841 – January 1884) was a German chess master.

Uncle of Jacques Mieses and brother of Fabius Mieses, he studied medicine at the University of Breslau, and was one of chess pupils of Adolf Anderssen. He lost a match to him (0½–4½) in 1867, and was a frequent chess opponent of Johannes Zukertort and Jakob Rosanes in Breslau.

He won at Bad Ems 1871 and shared 1st with Anderssen but lost a play-off game to him at Leipzig 1871 (Kongress des Mitteldeutschen Schachbundes, the first Middle German Chess Congress), He lost a match to Johannes von Minckwitz (3½–5½) at Leipzig 1872.
