= Oscar Gelbfuhs =

Moravian-Austrian chess player

Oscar Gelbfuhs (9 November 1852 in Šternberk, Moravia – 27 September 1877 in Cieszyn, Austrian Silesia) was a chess master from Austria-Hungary.

He took 11th in the Vienna 1873 chess tournament (Wilhelm Steinitz and Joseph Henry Blackburne won). Gelbfuhs invented and proposed an auxiliary scoring method for tie breaking (Sonnenborn–Berger) there. A simpler version the "Neustadtl Score" later became widely used.
