= Gustav Neumann =

German chess player (1838–1881)

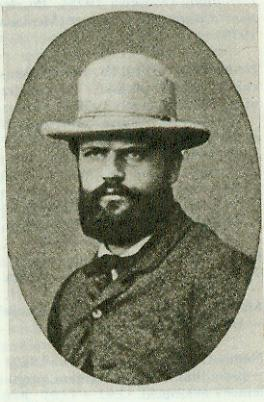
Gustav Richard Ludwig Neumann

Gustav Richard Ludwig Neumann (15 December 1838 – 16 February 1881) was a German chess master.

Neumann was born in Gleiwitz in the Prussian Province of Silesia. In matches he lost to Louis Paulsen (+3 –5 =3) at Leipzig 1864, and defeated Celso Golmayo Zúpide (+3 –0 =0), and Simon Winawer (+3 –0 =0) at Paris 1867. He also won against Samuel Rosenthal (+12 –2 =8) in three matches in Paris; (+5 –0 =6) in 1867, (+3 –1 =1) and (+4 –1 =1) in 1869.

During the late 1860s Neumann was one of the best chess players in the world. In tournaments he was first at Berlin 1865 (+34 –0 =0; first perfect score), first at Elberfeld 1865, first at Dundee 1867 Scotland International, second place went to Steinitz. Neumann reached fourth at Paris 1867 (Ignatz von Kolisch won), third/fourth at Baden-Baden 1870 (Adolf Anderssen won), and second, behind Anderssen, at Altona 1872. However, severe mental illness stopped him playing after 1872.

In 1864–1867, together with Anderssen, he founded and edited the Neue Berliner Schachzeitung.

== Death ==
After giving up chess completely due to a nervous disorder Gustav Neumann spent the last years of his life in the Provincial Sanatorium and Nursing Institution Allenberg in Allenberg, East Prussia, where he died on 16 February 1881.
