= Jean Dufresne =

German chess player and chess composer (1829–1893)

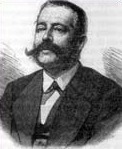

Personal information
- Born: 14 February 1829 Berlin, Kingdom of Prussia
- Died: 13 April 1893 (aged 64) Berlin, Kingdom of Prussia

Chess career
- Country: Germany

Jean Dufresne (14 February 1829 – 13 April 1893) was a German chess player and chess composer. He was a student of Adolf Anderssen, to whom he lost the "Evergreen game" in 1852.

== Life ==
Dufresne was born and died in Berlin. The son of a wealthy Jewish businessman, he attended law school but was forced to abandon his studies when his father ran into financial difficulties. He subsequently became a journalist.

Dufresne was an unsuccessful novelist under the anagrammatic pseudonym E. S. Freund, but wrote several chess books, one of which, Kleines Lehrbuch des Schachspiels (1881, known in Germany as Der Kleine Dufresne) ran to many editions and taught several generations of players. In a letter to Paul Dirac at the end of 1929, Werner Heisenberg deemed Dufresne's handbook "the best book about theory of Chess". He also wrote a popular book on Paul Morphy.

His grave is located in the Jewish Cemetery Berlin-Weißensee.

== Notable games ==
Dufresne took first in the Berliner Schachgesellschaft in 1853 and won an 1854 match against Carl Mayet (+7−5), a member of the Berlin Pleiades. Although he had a negative record against Anderssen, he had a plus record against Daniel Harrwitz, who in turn had a plus record against Anderssen. Here is his win against Harrwitz in Berlin in 1848:

1.e4 e5 2.Nf3 Nc6 3.Bc4 Bc5 4.b4 Bxb4 5.c3 Bc5 6.O-O d6 7.d4 exd4 8.cxd4 Bb6 9.Bb2 Nf6 10.Qc2 O-O 11.e5 dxe5 12.dxe5 Nd5 13.Rd1 Be6 14.Bxd5 Bxd5 15.Nc3 Ne7 16.Ng5 Ng6 17.Nxh7 Kxh7 18.Nxd5 Qg5 19.Rd3 c6 20.Rh3+ Kg8 21.Rg3 Qh4 22.Nf6+ gxf6 23.Rxg6+ fxg6 24.Qxg6+ Kh8 25.exf6 Rf7 26.Qxf7 Rg8 27.Kh1 Qg4 28.Rg1 Bxf2 29.Qe8 Kh7 30.f7 1-0

== See also ==
- List of chess games
