= Deutsche Schachzeitung =

Deutsche Schachzeitung (English: "German Chess Magazine") was the first German chess magazine. Founded in 1846 by Ludwig Bledow under the title Schachzeitung der Berliner Schachgesellschaft and appearing monthly, it took the name Deutsche Schachzeitung in 1872. (Another magazine used the title Deutsche Schachzeitung from 1846 to 1848.)

When it ceased publication in December 1988, it was the oldest existing magazine globally, having been published regularly since its founding in 1846 except for a five-year break (1945–1949) following World War II.

Since January 1989, the Deutsche Schachzeitung was merged with the Deutsche Schachblätter – Schach-Report, edited in Hollfeld. The resulting magazine appeared with the names of both former magazines on its cover until December 1996. Since January 1997, this magazine merged again with the Berlin magazine Schach. The resulting magazine kept the names Schach and Schach-Report on its cover for one year, but the name Deutsche Schachzeitung had disappeared from the cover. Since 1998, the magazine appears under the simple title Schach. However, the table of contents is still headed by the names Deutsche Schachzeitung, Deutsche Schachblätter, and Schach-Report.

The Deutsche Schachzeitung was in its prime in the first two decades of the 20th century.

== Editors ==
From	To	Editors
1846.07	1846.08	Ludwig Bledow
1846.09	1851	Wilhelm Hanstein, Otto von Oppen
1851	1852	Otto von Oppen, N.D. Nathan
1852	1858	Otto von Oppen
1858.12	1864	Max Lange
1865.01	1866	E. von Schmidt, Johannes Minckwitz
1867	1871	Johannes Minckwitz
1872	1876	Johannes Minckwitz, Adolf Anderssen
1876.12	1878	Dr. Constantin Schwede, Adolf Anderssen
1879.01	1886.12	Johannes Minckwitz
1887.01	1891	Curt von Bardeleben, Hermann von Gottschall
1892	1896	Hermann von Gottschall
1897		Siegbert Tarrasch
1898		Johann Berger, Paul Lipke
1899	1916	Johann Berger, Carl Schlechter
1917	1918	Carl Schlechter
1919	1921	Jacques Mieses
1922	1923	Friedrich Palitzsch
1924		Friedrich Palitzsch, Ernst Grünfeld
1925		Max Blümich, Friedrich Palitzsch, Ernst Grünfeld
1926		Max Blümich, Friedrich Palitzsch
1927	1931	Max Blümich, Friedrich Palitzsch, Heinrich Ranneforth
1932.02	1942	Max Blümich, Heinrich Ranneforth, Josef Halumbirek
1942.03	1942.04	Heinrich Ranneforth, Josef Halumbirek
1942.05	1943.03	Theodor Gerbec, Heinrich Ranneforth, Josef Halumbirek
1943.04	1944.09	Ludwig Rellstab
1950.12	1988	Rudolf Teschner
