= Ignatz Kolisch =

Austro-Hungarian chess player (1837–1889)

Baron Ignatz von Kolisch
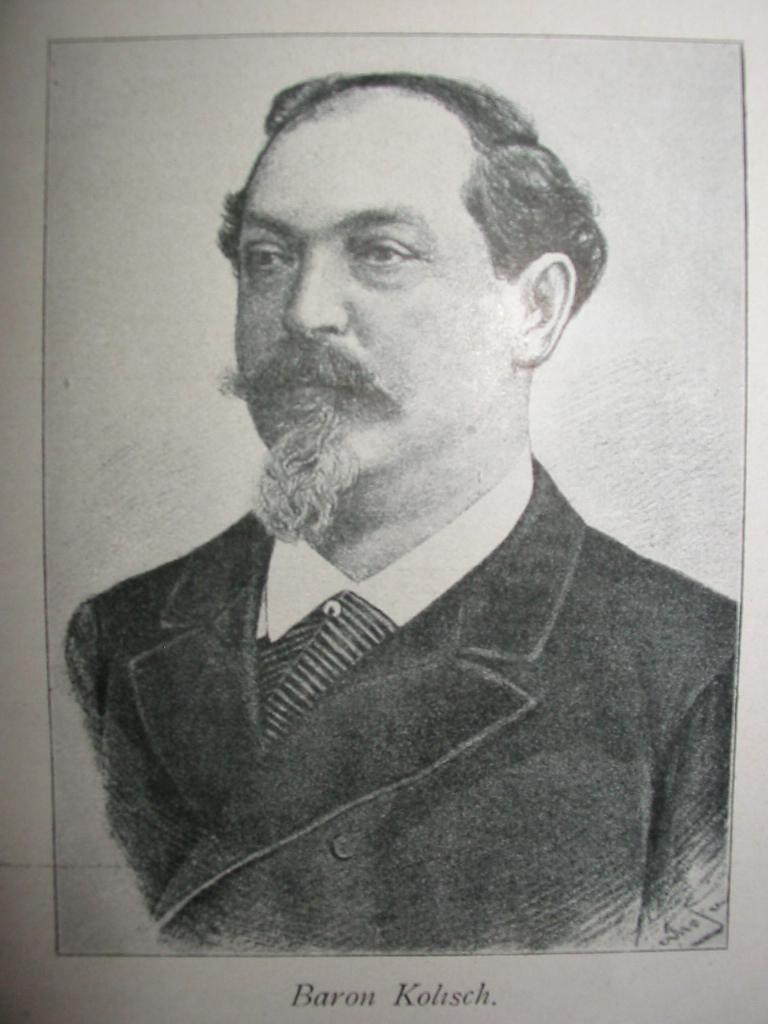

Personal information
- Born: 6 April 1837 Pressburg, Kingdom of Hungary, Austrian Empire (today Bratislava, Slovakia
- Died: 30 April 1889 (aged 52) Vienna, Austro-Hungarian Empire (today Austria)

Chess career
- Country: Austria-Hungary

Baron Ignatz von Kolisch (6 April 1837 – 30 April 1889), also Baron Ignaz von Kolisch (German) or báró Kolisch Ignác (Hungarian), was a merchant, journalist and chess master with Jewish roots.

== Life ==
Kolisch was born into a Jewish family in Pressburg (known today as Bratislava). Both in business and as a chess player he was eminently successful. In his early years he moved to Vienna, then spent a year in Italy. In 1859 he arrived in Paris and in 1860–62 mostly sojourned in London, where he edited the Chess Player's Chronicle with Adolf Zytogorski and Josef Kling. In summer 1862 he accompanied the Russian Count Kushelev-Bezborodko to St. Petersburg, where he won a match against Ilya Shumov. Later he moved to Paris and in 1869 to Vienna. He became involved in banking and became a millionaire and chess patron, organizing and sponsoring important chess tournaments in the 1870s and 1880s. He founded the Wiener Börse-Syndikatskasse in 1869, and in 1873 established a commission house in Paris; and by prudent management he acquired considerable wealth. In 1881 he received the title of baron from Georg II, Duke of Saxe-Meiningen.

As a chess player, Kolisch soon became known for his brilliant and aggressive style, but he was not a frequent participant in tournaments. In 1860 he won the first prize at the international tournament held at Cambridge, England. In 1861 he lost a match to Adolf Anderssen, the strongest player of the day, by a score of 5–4. The same year, he drew a match with Louis Paulsen. In 1867 at the Paris tournament he secured first place, defeating both Szymon Winawer and Wilhelm Steinitz.

Kolisch was the founder and editor-in-chief of the Wiener Allgemeine Zeitung, to which, under the pseudonym "Ideka", he contributed many feuilletons. The protagonist in the short story "The chessbaron" (A sakkbáró) by Ferenc Móra is based on him. He died of kidney failure in 1889.

== See also ==
- List of Jewish chess players

== Sources ==
- "Колиш, Игнатий" . Brockhaus and Efron Encyclopedic Dictionary (in Russian). 1906.
- E. T. Blanchard, Examples of Chess Master-Play, 1st series (transl. from the German of Jean Dufresne), Index, New Barnet, 1893.
- Singer, Isidore; Porter, A. (1901–1906), "Kolisch, Baron Ignaz Von", Jewish Encyclopedia, vol. 7, p. 547
- F. Zavatarelli, Ignaz Kolisch. The Life and Chess Career, McFarland, 2015.
