= Max Lange =

German chess player

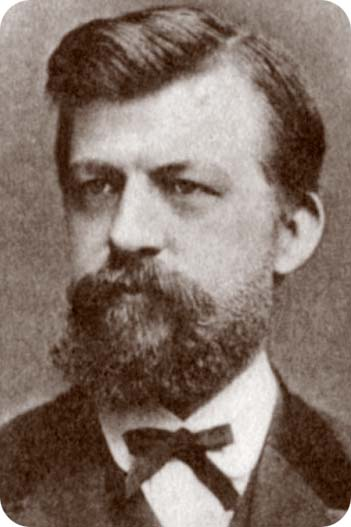

Personal information
- Born: Max Lange; August 7, 1832 Magdeburg, Germany
- Died: December 8, 1899 (aged 67) Leipzig, Germany

Chess career
- Country: Germany

Max Lange (August 7, 1832, Magdeburg – December 8, 1899, Leipzig) was a German chess player, problem composer, and writer, as well as an important chess organizer and chess governance leader.

== Chess career ==
Lange was an editor of the Deutsche Schachzeitung (German Chess Newsletter) from 1858 to 1864. He was a founder of Westdeutscher Schachbund (West German Chess Federation, WDSB), and an organizer of the 9th DSB–Congress (Kongress des Deutschen Schachbundes) at Leipzig 1894. He was second President of the German Chess Federation (DSB).

Lange won four Western German championships: thrice in Düsseldorf (1862, 1863, 1864), and at Aachen (Aix-la-Chapelle) 1868 (7th WDSB–Congress). He also won at Hamburg 1868 (1st Congress of the North German Chess Federation). The statistical website Chessmetrics.com estimates that Lange was one of the top ten players in the world in the 1860s. He took an extended sabbatical from tournament chess from 1868 until his final appearance in the third DSB-Congress at Nuremberg 1883. Lange finished in a tie for 17–19th place, which was last. His ability had clearly deteriorated as a result of his long layoff but Chessmetrics.com places him among the top 40 to 50 players in the world in the 1880s on the basis of this result.

Lange should not be confused with the lesser-known but identically named Dr. Max Lange (1883–1923), who is generally referenced as "Max Lange 2" in chess literature and whose best-known tournaments were Hilversum 1903 and the 14th DSB-Congress at Coburg 1904.

== Works ==
Lange published Lehrbuch des Schachspiels (Textbook of Chess Games, Halle 1856), and Handbuch der Schachaufgaben (Handbook of Chess problems, Leipzig 1862).

== Legacy ==
The variation of the Two Knights Defense 1.e4 e5 2.Nf3 Nc6 3.Bc4 Nf6 4.d4 exd4 5.0-0 Bc5 6.e5 is called the Max Lange Attack. The Vienna Game variation 1.e4 e5 2.Nc3 Nc6 is known as the Max Lange Defense.
