= Cecil Valentine De Vere =

British chess player (1845–1875)

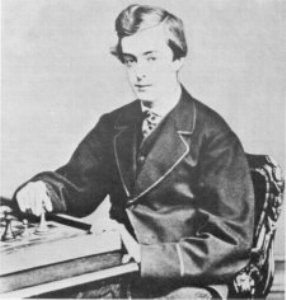
- De Vere c.1865

Personal information
- Born: Cecil Valentine De Vere; 14 February 1846 London, England
- Died: 9 February 1875 (aged 28) Torquay, England

Cecil Valentine De Vere (14 February 1846 – 9 February 1875) was the winner of the first official British Chess Championship in 1866.

He was born Valentine John Cecil De Vere Mathews on 14 February 1846 in London. It is likely that he was the illegitimate son of William Cecil De Vere, a naval officer and son of the second Baronet of Curragh. His mother was Katherine Mathews, a Welsh-born household servant. He played chess effortlessly and elegantly without recourse to chess study or theory; in this respect he was not unlike José Raúl Capablanca. His meteoric rise to fame and equally dramatic decline has been compared to Paul Morphy and he is often cited as 'The English Morphy'. His great natural talent for the game was attended by an equal indolence for work. Cecil De Vere contracted tuberculosis around 1867 and later became dependent on alcohol. He lived in London for most of his life but was sent to Torquay by his chess friends in 1874 in the vain hope of recuperation. He died in Torquay, UK, aged 28, and is buried there.
