= Louis Paulsen =

German chess player (1833–1891)

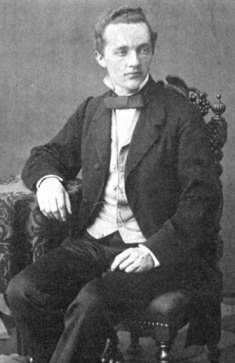
Louis Paulsen

Louis Paulsen (15 January 1833 in Gut Nassengrund near Blomberg, Principality of Lippe – 18 August 1891) was a German chess player. In the 1860s and 1870s, he was among the top players in the world. He was a younger brother of Wilfried Paulsen.

Paulsen was one of the first players to challenge the notion that an attack could be constructed out of brilliance. He put forward the idea that any brilliant attack would have failed against correct defence. His ideas were grasped by Wilhelm Steinitz, who declared that attack and defence have equal status, and particularly by Aron Nimzowitsch, who listed Paulsen among his six greatest "purely defensive players". Paul Morphy and Paulsen were early masters of the game and of blindfold chess; they were capable of playing 10 blindfold games at the same time without any major errors.

Paulsen played in the final match of the 1857 First American Chess Congress, losing to Paul Morphy five games to one with two draws. In 1862 Paulsen drew an eight-game match with Adolf Anderssen. Paulsen defeated Anderssen in matches in 1876 and 1877.

== Paulsen pawns ==
Paulsen pawns is a term coined by Nimzowitsch for a restricted pawn centre with two pawns on squares d6 and e6 for Black or d3 and e3 for White, often coupled with an open c-file. This restricted centre makes it difficult for the opponent to whip up a quick attack by advancing his centre. Paulsen pawns are the stalwart of the Paulsen Variation of the Sicilian Defence.

== Chess opening contributions ==
=== Sicilian Dragon ===
The modern form of the Dragon was originated by Paulsen around 1880. It was played frequently by Henry Bird that decade, then received general acceptance around 1900. In chess, the Dragon Variation is one of the main lines of the Sicilian Defence and begins with the moves:

1.e4 c5 2.Nf3 d6 3.d4 cxd4 4.Nxd4 Nf6 5.Nc3 g6

In the Dragon, Black fianchettoes his bishop on the h8–a1 diagonal. The line is one of the sharpest variations of the Sicilian Defence, making it one of the sharpest of all chess openings.

=== Sicilian Defence, Paulsen Variation ===
A less famous variation in the Sicilian Defence is the Paulsen Variation. The line goes as follows:

1.e4 c5 2.Nf3 e6 3.d4 cxd4 4.Nxd4 a6

or

1.e4 c5 2.Nf3 e6 3.d4 cxd4 4.Nxd4 Nc6 5.Nc3 a6

=== Paulsen Attack in the Scotch Game ===
The move 7.Bb5 in the Scotch Game is associated with Paulsen's name, as the Paulsen Attack: 1.e4 e5 2.Nf3 Nc6 3.d4 exd4 4.Nxd4 Bc5 5.Be3 Qf6 6.c3 Nge7 7.Bb5.

=== Paulsen Variation in the Vienna Game ===
After 1.e4 e5 2.Nc3 Nc6, the move 3.g3 is known as the Paulsen Variation in the Vienna Game. Paulsen played the move five times in the Vienna 1873 chess tournament.

=== Paulsen Attack in the Center Game ===
1.e4 e5 2.d4 exd4 3.Qxd4 Nc6 4.Qe3 is the main line of the Center Game, sometimes referred to as the Paulsen Attack.

=== Paulsen Countergambit ===
1.e4 e5 2. Nf3 d5!? is the Paulsen Countergambit and now usually known as the Elephant gambit (amongst other names). Louis Paulsen drew once and lost once to Paul Morphy in 1857 whilst playing casual games during the 1st American Chess Congress.

=== Sicilian Defence, Paulsen-Basman Defence ===
1.e4 c5 2. Nf3 e6 3. d4 cxd4 4. Nxd4 Bc5 is the Paulsen-Basman Defence. Louis Paulsen famously played this line four times - losing 3 and drawing 1, against Paul Morphy in the final of the First American Chess Congress.

== Sources ==
- Hooper, David; Whyld, Kenneth (1996) [First pub. 1992]. The Oxford Companion to Chess (2nd ed.). Oxford University Press. ISBN 0-19-280049-3.
