= Szymon Winawer =

Polish chess player (1838–1919)

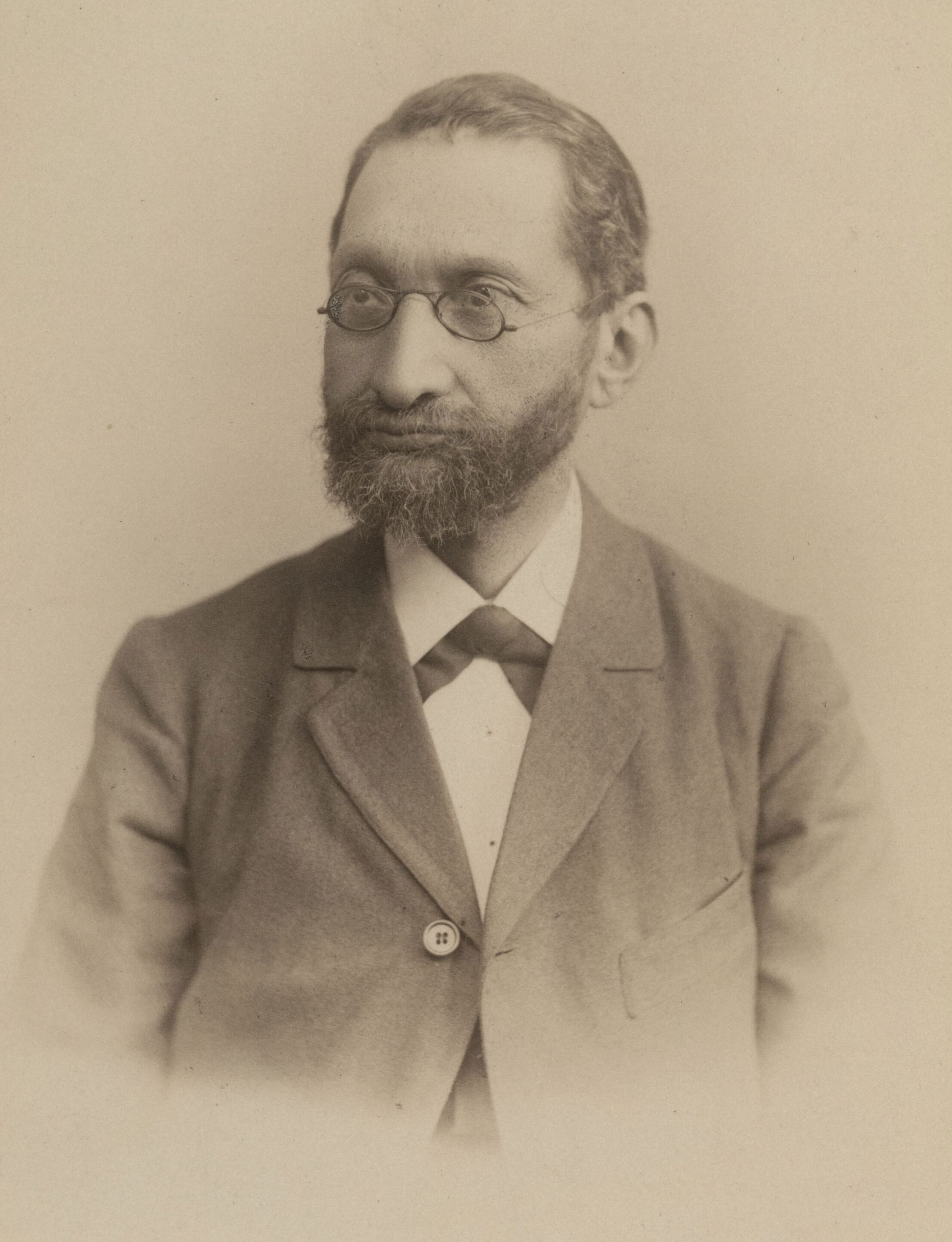
- Born: Szymon Abramowicz Winawer; March 6, 1838; Warsaw, Congress Poland, Russian Empire
- Died: November 29, 1919 (aged 81); Warsaw, Poland
- Occupation: Chess player
- Years active: 1867–1901

Szymon Abramowicz Winawer (Russian: Ши́мон Абра́мович Вина́вер, romanized: Shimon Abramovich Vinaver; March 6, 1838 – November 29, 1919) was a Polish chess player of world-class Master strength, who won the German Chess Championship in 1883.

== Tournament and match results ==
At the Paris 1867 tournament held at the Café de la Régence, his first international tournament, Winawer finished in second place, tied with Wilhelm Steinitz behind Ignatz von Kolisch. He remained one of the world's best players for the next 15 years.

At Warsaw 1868, Winawer won the first chess tournament conducted in Poland. He won an 1875 match in Saint Petersburg against Russian master Ilya Shumov, 5–2. At Paris 1878 Winawer tied for first place (+14−3=5) with Johannes Zukertort, ahead of Joseph Henry Blackburne and George Henry Mackenzie, but took second prize after the play-off. At Berlin 1881 he finished =3rd with Mikhail Chigorin. Winawer's best result was a first place tie with Steinitz at Vienna 1882, in what was the strongest chess tournament in history up to that time. At London 1883 he failed to place for the first time, but later that year at Nuremberg (3rd German Congress) he finished first, defeating Blackburne who took second place.

After a long absence Winawer returned to chess in the 1890s, but by then he had been surpassed by younger players including Siegbert Tarrasch and Emanuel Lasker. At Dresden 1892 and Budapest 1896, he placed sixth. He lost an 1896 match to Dawid Janowski 2–5. He turned 63 during his final international tournament, Monte Carlo 1901, and did not place among the prizewinners. Winawer continued to play competitive chess into his 60s, and in his career he faced all of the top players from the last third of the 19th century, from Adolf Anderssen to Lasker. His rivalry with Blackburne stretched from 1870 to 1901, and they met in competitive games in five consecutive decades. Winawer died in Warsaw on November 29, 1919, aged 81.

== Legacy ==
Position: a8 black rook, b8 black knight, c8 black bishop, d8 black queen, e8 black king, g8 black knight, h8 black rook, a7 black pawn, b7 black pawn, c7 black pawn, f7 black pawn, g7 black pawn, h7 black pawn, e6 black pawn, d5 black pawn, b4 black bishop, d4 white pawn, e4 white pawn, c3 white knight, a2 white pawn, b2 white pawn, c2 white pawn, f2 white pawn, g2 white pawn, h2 white pawn, a1 white rook, c1 white bishop, d1 white queen, e1 white king, f1 white bishop, g1 white knight, h1 white rook

Winawer Variation

Winawer has several opening variations named for him. The most popular is the Winawer Variation of the French Defence (1.e4 e6 2.d4 d5 3.Nc3 Bb4). His name is also associated with the Winawer Attack in the Ruy Lopez. At Monte Carlo 1901, Winawer's last international tournament, he introduced the Winawer Countergambit in the Slav Defence in a game against Frank Marshall.

== Sample game ==
In one of his best known games, he beat Steinitz with White at Nuremberg 1896:

1.e4 e5 2.d4 exd4 3.Qxd4 Nc6 4.Qe3 Nf6 5.Nc3 Bb4 6.Bd2 0-0 7.0-0-0 Re8 8.Bc4 Bxc3 9.Bxc3 Nxe4 10.Qf4 Nf6 11.Nf3 d6 12.Ng5 Be6 13.Bd3 h6 14.h4 Nd5 15.Bh7+ Kh8 16.Rxd5 Bxd5 17.Be4 f6 18.Bxd5 fxg5 19.hxg5 Ne5 20.g6 1–0

== See also ==
- List of Jewish chess players
