= Johannes Zukertort =

German-British chess player (1842–1888)

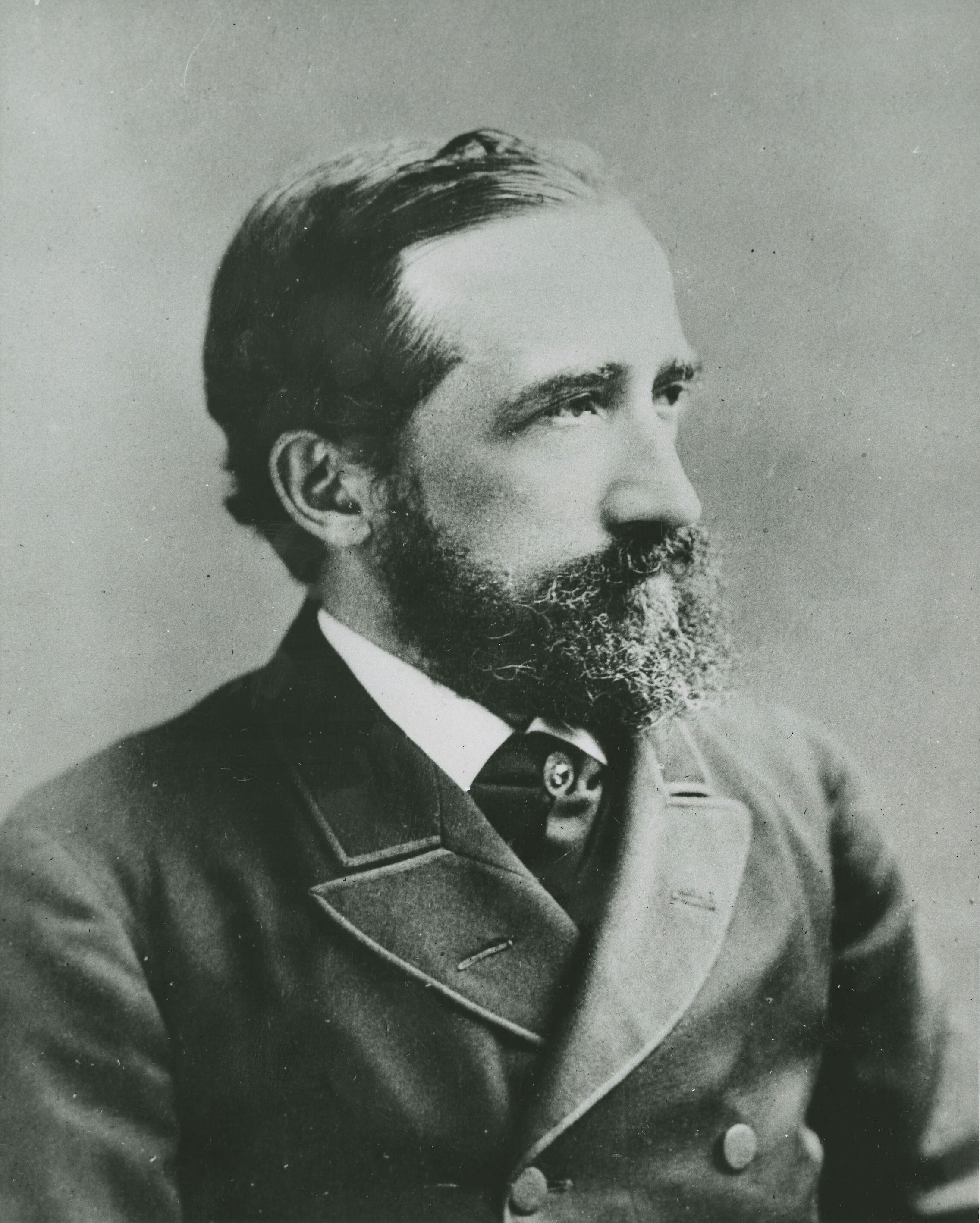
- Zukertort, early 1880s

Personal information
- Born: Johannes Hermann Zukertort; 7 September 1842 Lublin, Congress Poland, Russian Empire
- Died: 20 June 1888 (aged 45) London, England

Chess career
- Country: German Empire (before 1878); United Kingdom (after 1878)

Johannes Hermann Zukertort (Polish: Jan Hermann Cukiertort; 7 September 1842 – 20 June 1888) was a Polish-born British-German chess master. He was one of the leading world players for most of the 1870s and 1880s, but lost to Wilhelm Steinitz in the World Chess Championship 1886, which is generally regarded as the first World Chess Championship match. He was also defeated by Steinitz in 1872 in an unofficial championship.

Zukertort filled his relatively short life with a wide range of other achievements as a soldier, musician, linguist, journalist and political activist.

== Early life and non-chess achievements ==
Zukertort was born on 7 September 1842 in Lublin, Congress Poland, Russian Empire as Jan Hermann Cukiertort. He said that his mother was the Baroness Krzyżanowska (Krzyzanovska). His parents were Polish Jews who converted to Protestant Christianity and missionized for the London Society for Promoting Christianity Amongst the Jews. Because the Christian Protestant mission among the Jewish population in Russian-occupied Poland was considered illegal and heretical, the Zukertort family emigrated to Prussia. He was educated at the gymnasium of Breslau (now Wrocław), and in 1866 at the University of Breslau, from which he graduated in medicine in 1866. As a member of the medical corps of the Prussian army he saw service in 1866 during the Austro-Prussian War, and again during the Franco-Prussian War of 1870–1871.

Zukertort is widely suspected of having embellished his biography. In an account of his life for the Eastern Daily Press in 1872 many claims were made on his behalf: aristocratic descent, fluency in nine languages (fourteen, according to other sources), and proficiency in swordsmanship, dominoes, and whist; it was also stated that he had played 6,000 games of chess with Adolf Anderssen, fought in numerous battles, and was awarded the Order of the Red Eagle, the Iron Cross of the German Army, and seven other medals. He also found time to get an M.D. at Breslau in 1865, and work on the staff of the Allgemeine Zeitung – Otto von Bismarck's private organ – in addition to writing two chess books and working as the editor of a chess magazine for several years. The Oxford Companion to Chess comments, "There is some truth in the last sentence: He was co-author of the books [and] co-editor of the chess magazine."

== Chess career ==
=== Style of play ===
In an age where the majority of players played exclusively 1.e4, Zukertort was an occasional early experimenter with openings such as 1.Nf3 and 1.c4.

In his prime Zukertort also excelled at blindfold chess. In 1876, he played sixteen games simultaneously while blindfolded, winning eleven, drawing four, and losing only one.

=== Learning chess ===
Zukertort learned to play chess in Breslau when he was about age 19. Entering a tournament in that city, and receiving the odds of the queen, he lost every game, whereupon he took up the study of Bilguer's Handbuch, with the result that in 1862 he won games from the leading German chess player Adolf Anderssen at the odds of a knight. Zukertort studied with Anderssen, and within only a few years he became one of the strongest players in Germany.

Among many other notable matches that Zukertort played with Anderssen, he defeated him in 1866, lost in 1868 by a score of eight wins, three losses, one draw, and finally defeated him convincingly (5–2; no draws) in a match in 1871. In 1867 he moved to Berlin and in 1872 to London. In that year, he played Wilhelm Steinitz in London, losing 9–3 (7 losses, 1 win, 4 draws).

=== Late 1870s–early 1880s ===
Although Zukertort lost both his matches against Steinitz, he proved that he was superior to other opponents throughout the late 1870s and early 1880s. During this period top-class tournaments were rare and Zukertort's best performances were mostly in matches, notably against Anderssen in 1871 and Joseph Henry Blackburne in 1881 (6 wins, 2 losses, 5 draws). Nonetheless Zukertort was one of the most successful tournament players of his time: third place behind Steinitz and Blackburne at London, 1872; first place at Cologne, and second at Leipzig in 1877; tied for first with Simon Winawer at the Paris 1878 chess tournament and beat Winawer in the playoff; second at Berlin in 1881, behind Blackburne; tied for fourth at Vienna in 1882; first at London in 1883, 3 points ahead of Steinitz. The 1878 win in Paris led to some suggestion that Zukertort was the world's leading player, although Steinitz did not compete. (Note: "We may mention that since Mr. Morphy gave up playing public chess, and since Herr Steinitz refused to engage in tournaments, Herr Zukertort is entitled to the rank of chess champion of the world, having taken first prize at the Paris tourney last year." — Irish Times (6 March 1879) cited by Winter on ChessHistory.com .)

Zukertort's win in the London 1883 chess tournament was his most significant success: He won his games against most of the world's leading players, scoring 22/26, and he finished 3 points ahead of Steinitz, who was second with 19/26. This tournament established that Steinitz and Zukertort were clearly the best two players in the world, and led to the World Chess Championship match between these two.

The 1886 World Chess Championship match lasted from 11 January to 29 March 1886. After building up a 4–1 lead Zukertort wilted, lost four of the last five games, and lost the match by 12½–7½.

=== Decline and death ===
After his 1886 defeat, Zukertort's health suffered and he was a greatly weakened player for the remaining two years of his life. Diagnoses of his ailments include rheumatism, coronary heart disease, kidney problems, and arteriosclerosis. His results after the 1886 match declined steeply: Seventh at London, and third at Nottingham in 1886; fifteenth at Frankfurt, and fourth at London in 1887; lost a match in 1887 against Blackburne (1 win, 5 losses, and 8 draws); and seventh at London in 1888.

Poor health and lack of physical stamina appeared to be one of Zukertort's two long-term weaknesses: Some commentators attributed to illness the severity of his defeat in the 1872 match against Steinitz; aside from the tournaments mentioned above, in the 1883 London tournament he won 22 of his first 23 games – enough to give him an uncatchable lead – but lost his last 3 games.

His other weakness was that, while no one had greater attacking flair, Zukertort never approached Steinitz' understanding of positional play, and Steinitz often outmaneuvered him fairly simply.

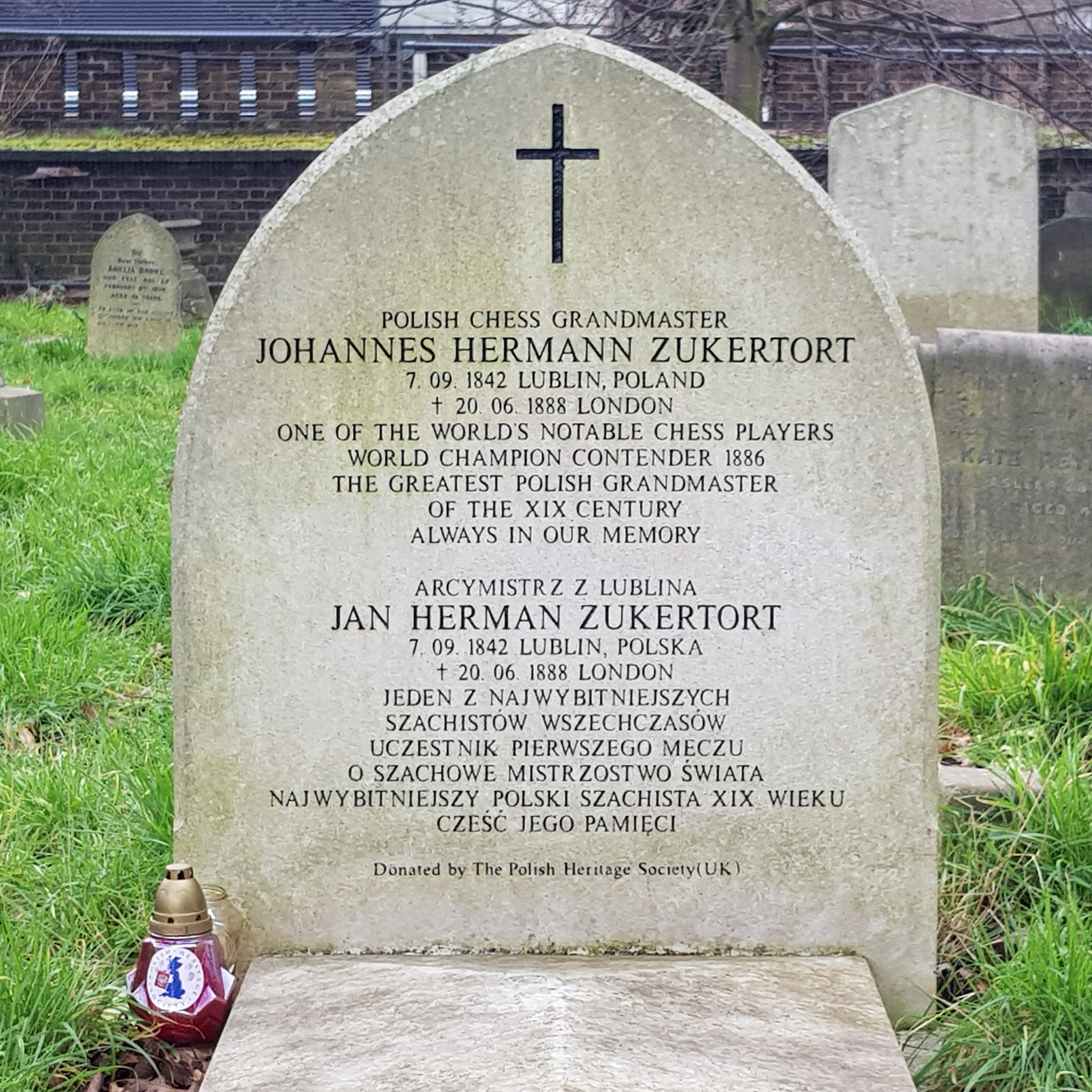
Rededicated grave of Zukertort, in Brompton Cemetery

Zukertort died on 20 June 1888, in London, from a cerebral haemorrhage after playing a game in a tournament at Simpson's Divan, which he was leading at the time. He is buried in Brompton Cemetery, London.

== Notable games ==
Position: c8 black rook, h8 black king, a7 black pawn, b7 black bishop, e7 black queen, h7 white pawn, b6 black pawn, d5 white pawn, e5 black pawn, e4 black pawn, b3 white pawn, e3 white rook, a2 white pawn, b2 white bishop, c2 black rook, d2 white queen, g2 white pawn, h2 white pawn, f1 white rook, g1 white king

Zukertort-Blackburne, 1883. Zukertort (white) here played 28 Qb4!! and the queen cannot be taken, due to: 28...Qxb4 29 Bxe5+ Kxh7 30 Rh3+ and mate soon follows.
{{{2}}}
- Zukertort vs. NN, Leipzig, 1877, Vienna Game: Vienna Gambit (C26), 1–0 White sacrifices the queen and hunts the black king to death. In the final position, 17.Bf4 mate is unavoidable.
- Mikhail Chigorin vs. Zukertort, Tnmt, London 1883, Spanish Game: Berlin Defense. Rio de Janeiro Variation (C67), 0–1 Two strong central pawns against the white king.
- Zukertort vs. Joseph Henry Blackburne, London, 1883 Zukertort sacrifices his queen but Blackburne cannot accept, Zukertort sacrifices a rook which Blackburne declines, soon Zukertort forces Blackburne to take the rook and resign three moves later. Steinitz described this as "one of the most brilliant games on record".

== See also ==
- Tennison Gambit, also known as the Zukertort Gambit.
- List of Jewish chess players
