= Berlin 1881 chess tournament =

German chess event

The Deutscher Schachbund (DSB, the German Chess Federation) had been founded in Leipzig on July 18, 1877. When the next meeting took place in the Schützenhaus, Leipzig on July 15, 1879, sixty-two clubs had become members of the federation. Hofrat Dr. Rudolf von Gottschall became Chairman and Hermann Zwanzig the General Secretary. When foreign players were invited to Berlin in 1881, an important and successful formula was completed. A master tournament was organised every second year, and Germans could partake in many groups and their talents qualified for master tournaments by a master title in the Hauptturnier.

The Berlin 1881 chess tournament (the second DSB Congress,2.DSB-Kongreß), organised by Hermann Zwanzig and Emil Schallopp, took place in Berlin from August 29 to September 17, 1881.

== Masters Tournament ==
The final standings and crosstable:

#	Player	1	2	3	4	5	6	7	8	9	10	11	12	13	14	15	16	17	Total
1	Joseph Henry Blackburne (United Kingdom)	x	1	1	1	0	½	1	1	½	1	1	1	1	1	1	1	1	14
2	Johannes Hermann Zukertort (German Empire)	0	x	½	1	½	1	1	1	½	1	0	0	1	1	½	1	1	11
3	Szymon Winawer (Russian Empire)	0	½	x	0	1	0	1	½	1	1	1	0	1	1	½	1	1	10½
4	Mikhail Chigorin (Russian Empire)	0	0	1	x	0	0	0	½	1	1	1	1	1	1	1	1	1	10½
5	James Mason (United States)	1	½	0	1	x	½	½	0	½	1	0	1	0	1	1	½	1	9½
6	Alexander Wittek (Austria-Hungary)	½	0	1	1	½	x	½	1	½	0	1	0	½	1	0	1	1	9½
7	Johannes Minckwitz (German Empire)	0	0	0	1	½	½	x	1	½	0	0	1	½	1	1	1	½	8½
8	Jacques Schwarz (Austria-Hungary)	0	0	½	½	1	0	0	x	1	1	½	1	0	½	1	½	1	8½
9	Johann Nepomuk Berger (Austria-Hungary)	½	½	0	0	½	½	½	0	x	0	0	1	1	½	1	1	1	8
10	Louis Paulsen (German Empire)	0	0	0	0	0	1	1	0	1	x	½	1	½	1	½	½	1	8
11	Wilfried Paulsen (German Empire)	0	1	0	0	1	0	1	½	1	½	x	0	½	½	0	½	1	7½
12	Emil Schallopp (German Empire)	0	1	1	0	0	1	0	0	0	0	1	x	1	0	1	0	1	7
13	Fritz Riemann (German Empire)	0	0	0	0	1	½	½	1	0	½	½	0	x	0	1	½	1	6½
14	Carl Wemmers (German Empire)	0	0	0	0	0	0	0	½	½	0	½	1	1	x	1	1	1	6½
15	Josef Noa (Austria-Hungary)	0	½	½	0	0	1	0	0	0	½	1	0	0	0	x	1	1	5½
16	Carl Friedrich Schmid (Russian Empire)	0	0	0	0	½	0	0	½	0	½	½	1	½	0	0	x	0	3½
17	H. von Schuetz (German Empire)	0	0	0	0	0	0	½	0	0	0	0	0	0	0	0	1	x	1½
18	Karl Pitschel (Austria-Hungary)	-	-	0	0	-	-	-	-	0	-	-	-	-	-	-	-	-	–

== Hauptturnier A ==
The Haupturnier A was won by Curt von Bardeleben, who earlier beat Berthold Lasker, Siegbert Tarrasch and Seger, in a preliminary group.

The final results:

1. Bardeleben 2½/3 (won a preliminary group, scoring 3/3)

2. Specht 2/3 (won a prel. group, scoring 2/3)

3. Kist 1½/3 (won a prel. group, scoring 2/2)

4. Reif 0/3 (won a prel. group, scoring 2/3)
