= Arnold Schottländer =

German chess master (1854–1909)

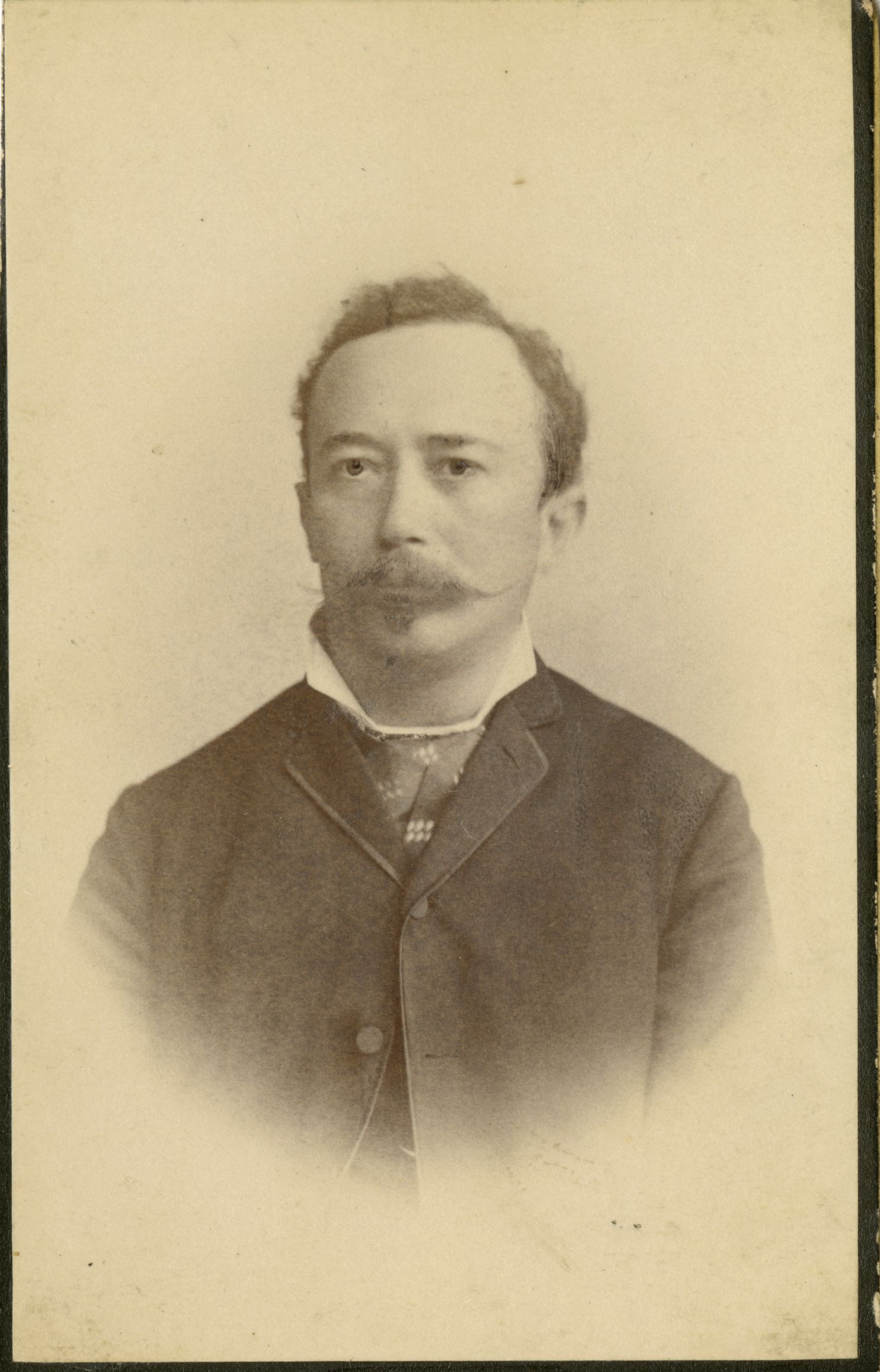
Arnold Schottlaender

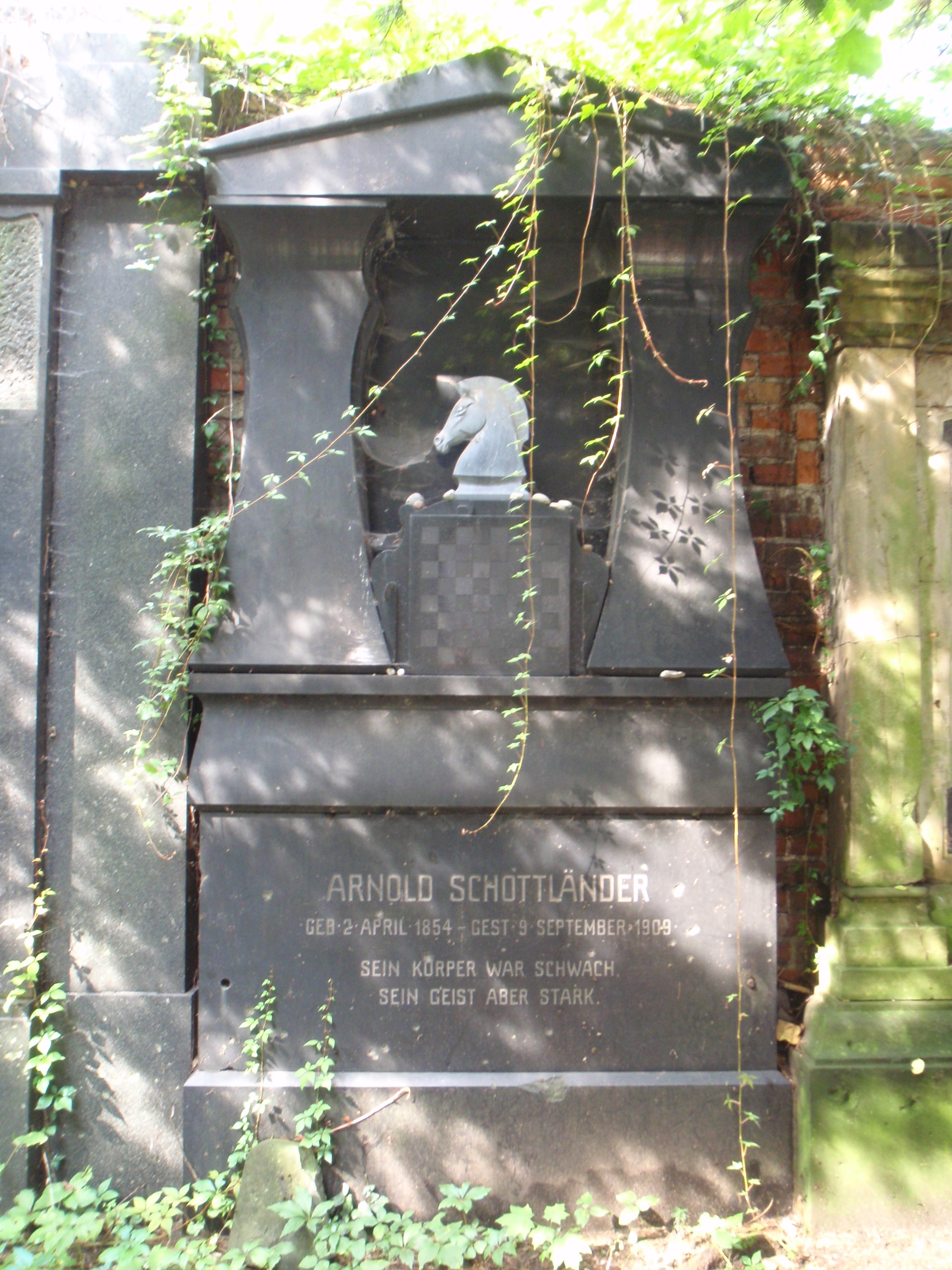
Grave of Arnold Schottländer at Old Jewish Cemetery in Breslau

Arnold Schottländer (2 April 1854 – 9 September 1909) was a German chess master.

Born in Münsterberg (now Ziębice), Silesia, he was one of the chess pupils of Adolf Anderssen.

He tied for 8-9th at Leipzig 1879 (the 1st DSB Congress, Berthold Englisch won), tied for 9-10th at Wiesbaden 1880 (Joseph Henry Blackburne, Englisch and Adolf Schwarz won), took 12th at Nuremberg 1883 (the 3rd DSB-Congress, Szymon Winawer won), took 16th at Hamburg 1885 (the 4th DSB-Congress, Isidor Gunsberg won), tied for 5-6th at Leipzig 1888 (Curt von Bardeleben and Fritz Riemann won), tied for 11-13th at Dresden 1892 (the 7th DSB-Congress, Siegbert Tarrasch won).

He is buried in the Old Jewish Cemetery of Breslau.
