= Johann Berger =

Austrian chess player (1845–1933)

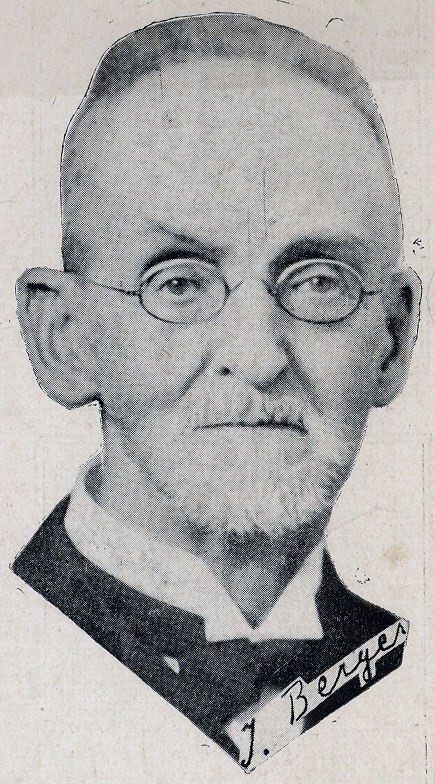
Johann Berger

Johann Nepomuk Berger (11 April 1845, Graz – 17 October 1933) was an Austrian chess master, theorist, endgame study composer, author and editor.

In September 1870, he won the first tournament in the Austro-Hungarian Empire at Graz. In 1875, he won a match against Alexander Wittek (14 : 4) in Graz, and drew a match with Paul Lipke (3½ : 3½) at Eisenach 1896.

He tied for 5–6th at Graz 1880 (Max Weiss, Johannes von Minckwitz and Adolf Schwarz won); tied for 9–10th at Berlin 1881 (second DSB Congress, Joseph Henry Blackburne won); took fourth at Nuremberg 1883 (third DSB–Congress, Simon Winawer won); tied for 11–12th at Hamburg 1885 (fourth DSB–Congress, Isidor Gunsberg won); tied for 5–6th at Frankfurt 1887 (fifth DSB–Congress, George Henry Mackenzie won); took tenth at Breslau 1889 (sixth DSB–Congress, Siegbert Tarrasch won); tied for 4–5th at Graz 1890 (Gyula Makovetz won); tied for 8–9th at Leipzig 1894 (ninth DSB–Congress, Tarrasch won).

He took eighth place at Cologne 1898 (eleventh DSB–Congress, Amos Burn won); tied for 7–10th at Munich 1900 (twelfth DSB–Congress, Géza Maróczy, Carl Schlechter and Harry Pillsbury won); tied for 6–7th at Coburg 1904 (fourteenth DSB–Congress, Curt von Bardeleben, Schlechter and Rudolf Swiderski won); took sixth at Barmen 1905 (Dawid Janowski and Maroczy won); tied for 7–8th at Vienna 1907 (Jacques Mieses won); tied for 16–18th in the Carlsbad 1907 chess tournament (Akiba Rubinstein won), and took fifteenth in the Vienna 1908 chess tournament (Oldřich Duras, Maróczy and Schlechter won).

Berger was the first Austrian to win an important international correspondence tournament the Monde Illustré 1889–1892, and he did so with the result of 45 wins, no losses, and three draws.

He was editor of the Deutsche Schachzeitung and author of Das Schachproblem und dessen Kunstgerechte Darstellung (Leipzig 1884), Theorie und Praxis der Endspiele (Leipzig 1890), Problemen, Studien und Partien (Leipzig 1914).

Berger was a major endgame study composer, having published more than 100 studies, many of which gave notable contributions to endgame theory. His book Theorie und Praxis der Endspiele (Theory and Practice of the Endgame) was published in 1891, revised in 1922, and supplemented in 1933. This was the first modern comprehensive book on practical endgames, and was the standard work on endgames for decades.

Berger discussed the tie-break system now called the Sonneborn–Berger system, but he did not invent it. See Tie-breaking in Swiss system tournaments#Sonneborn–Berger for details.
