= Wilfried Paulsen =

German chess player (1828–1901)

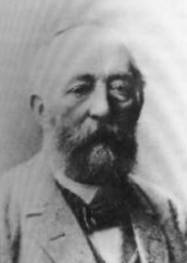
Wilfried Paulsen

Wilfried Paulsen (31 July 1828 – 6 February 1901) was a German chess master, an elder brother of Louis Paulsen.

He tied for 3rd-5th at Düsseldorf 1862 (2nd Western German Congress, Kongresse des Westdeutschen Schachbundes (WDSB), Max Lange won); took 2nd, behind Lange, at Düsseldorf 1863 (3rd WDSB–Congress); won at Cologne 1867 (6th WDSB–Congress, Quadrangular); shared 3rd at Aachen 1868 (7th WDSB–Congress, Lange won); took 5th at Barmen 1869 (8th WDSB–Congress, Adolf Anderssen won); took 6th at Krefeld 1871 (9th WDSB–Congress, Louis Paulsen won), and won at Düsseldorf 1876 (10th WDSB–Congress).

He shared 11th at Leipzig 1877 (3rd Central German Congress, Kongresse des Mitteldeutschen Schachbundes (MDSB), L. Paulsen won); tied for 5-6th at Frankfurt 1878 (12th WDSB–Congress, L. Paulsen won); took 10th at Leipzig 1879 (1st German DSB Congress, Kongresse des Deutschen Schachbundes (DSB), Berthold Englisch won); took 6th at Braunschweig 1880 (13th WDSB–Congress, L. Paulsen won); took 11th at Wiesbaden 1880 (Joseph Henry Blackburne, Englisch and Adolf Schwarz won).

He took 11th at Berlin 1881 (2nd DSB–Congress, Blackburne won); took 15th at Nuremberg 1883 (3rd DSB–Congress, Simon Winawer won); tied for 16-17th at Hamburg 1885 (4th DSB–Congress, Isidor Gunsberg won); tied for 5-6th at Leipzig 1888 (Curt von Bardeleben and Fritz Riemann won), and tied for 16-17th at Dresden 1892 (7th DSB–Congress, Siegbert Tarrasch won).
