= Hermann von Gottschall =

German chess player (1862–1933)

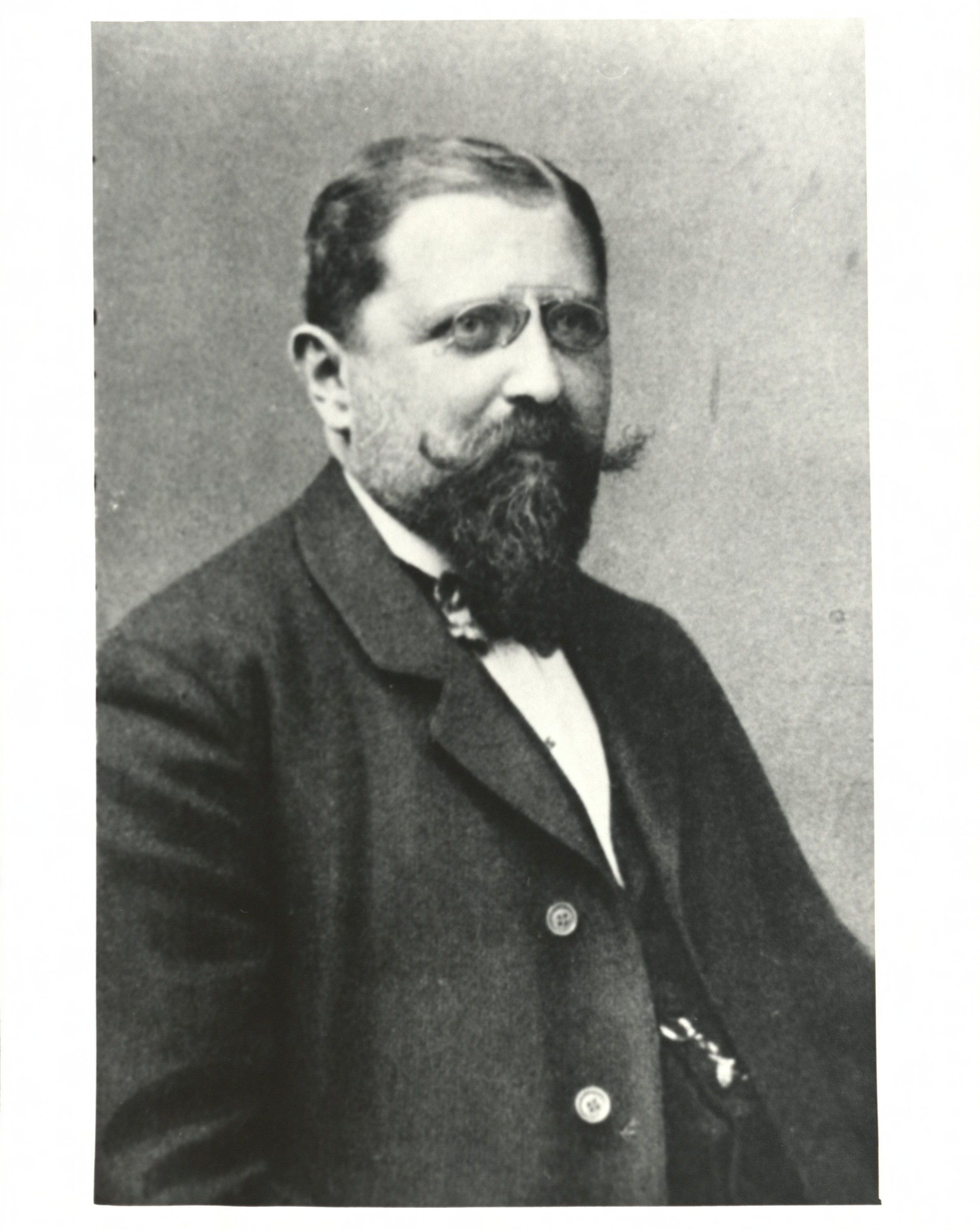

Personal information
- Born: Hermann von Gottschall; October 16, 1862 Posen, Prussian Posen
- Died: March 7, 1933 (aged 70) Görlitz, Lower Silesia

Chess career
- Country: Germany

Hermann von Gottschall (16 October 1862, Posen – 7 March 1933, Görlitz) was a German chess master, son of the poet Rudolf Gottschall (since 1877: von Gottschall) who was also a noted chess player.

He took 3rd at Nuremberg 1883 (the 3rd DSB Congress, Hauptturnier A), won at Berlin 1883, tied for 13-14th at Hamburg 1885 (the 4th DSB-Congress, Isidor Gunsberg won), tied for 17-18th at Frankfurt 1887 (the 5th DSB-Congress, George Henry Mackenzie won), shared 2nd with Jacques Mieses, behind Siegbert Tarrasch, at Nuremberg 1888, and tied for 5-8th at Berlin 1890 (Emanuel Lasker and Berthold Lasker won).

Dr. Hermann von Gottschall won at Halle 1892, tied for 8-9th at Dresden 1892 (the 7th DSB-Congress, Tarrasch won), tied for 4-6th at Kiel 1893 (the 8th DSB-Congress, Curt von Bardeleben and Carl Walbrodt won), took 12th at Cologne 1898 (the 11th Amos Burn won), tied for 11-12th at Munich 1900 (the 12th Géza Maróczy, Harry Pillsbury and Carl Schlechter won), tied for 11-12th at Hannover 1902 (the 13th DSB-Congress, Dawid Janowski won), took 13th at Coburg 1904 (the 14th DSB-Congress, Bardeleben, Schlechter and Rudolf Swiderski won), tied for 15-16th at Barmen 1905 (Janowski and Maróczy won), and tied for 14-15th at Düsseldorf 1908 (the 16th DSB-Congress, Frank Marshall won).

In 1918, he took 3rd in Breslau. After World War I, he took 9th at Breslau 1925 (the 24th DSB-Congress, Efim Bogoljubow won), tied for 7-8th at Hannover 1926 (Aron Nimzowitsch won), and tied for 14-16th at Bautzen 1929.

He was the chief editor of the Deutsche Schachzeitung and the author of Kleine Problem-Schule (Leipzig 1885), Der sechste Kongress des Deutschen Schachbundes. Breslau 1889 (Leipzig 1890), Sammlung von Schachaufgaben (Leipzig 1898–1908), Adolf Anderssen, Altmeister deutscher Schachspielkunst (Leipzig 1912), and Streifzüge durch das Gebiet des Schachproblems (Berlin/Leipzig 1926).
