= Carl Friedrich Schmid =

Baltic German chess player

Carl Friedrich Schmid (22 April 1840 – 31 March 1897) was a Baltic German chess player.

Born in Mitau, Russian Empire (today Jelgava, Latvia), he tied for 15-16th at Wiesbaden 1880 (Joseph Henry Blackburne, Berthold Englisch, and Adolf Schwarz won), and took 16th in the Berlin 1881 chess tournament (the 2nd DSB Congress, Blackburne won).
