= Carl Wemmers =

German chess player

Carl Wemmers (c. 1845 – 18 September 1882) was a German chess master.

He shared 2nd at Cologne 1877 (Johannes Zukertort won), took 8th at Frankfurt 1878 (Louis Paulsen won), took 12th at Leipzig 1879 (the 1st DSB Congress, Berthold Englisch won), tied for 3rd-5th at Braunschweig 1880 (L. Paulsen won), took 12th at Wiesbaden 1880, and tied for 13-14th in the Berlin 1881 chess tournament (the 2nd DSB Congress, Joseph Henry Blackburne won).
