= Fleissig =

Fleissig is a surname. Notable people with the surname include:

- Audrey G. Fleissig (born 1955), United States district judge
- Bernhard Fleissig (1853–1951), Hungarian-born Austrian chess master
- Max Fleissig (1845–1919), Hungarian-born Austrian chess master
