= Vienna 1882 chess tournament =

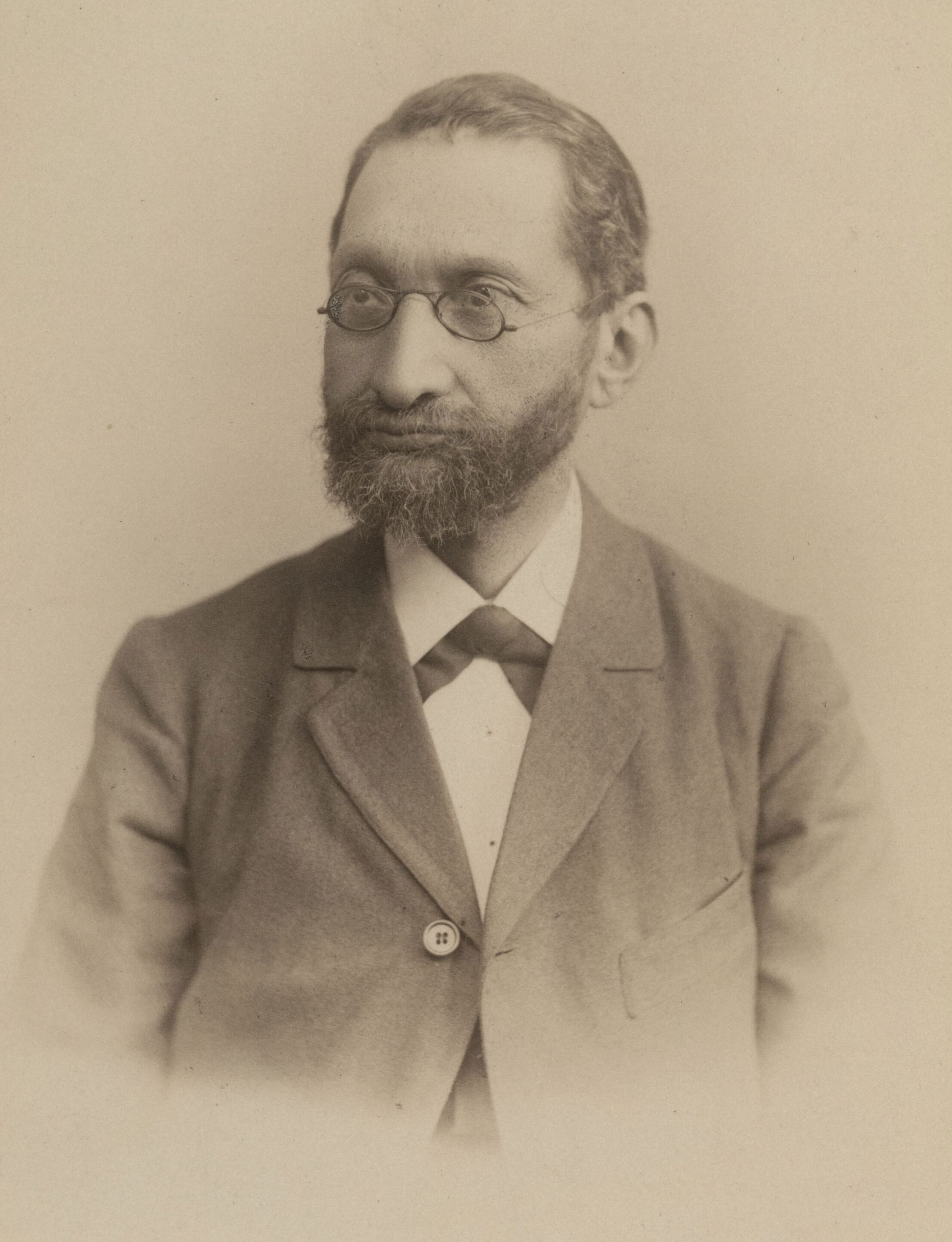
Szymon Winawer

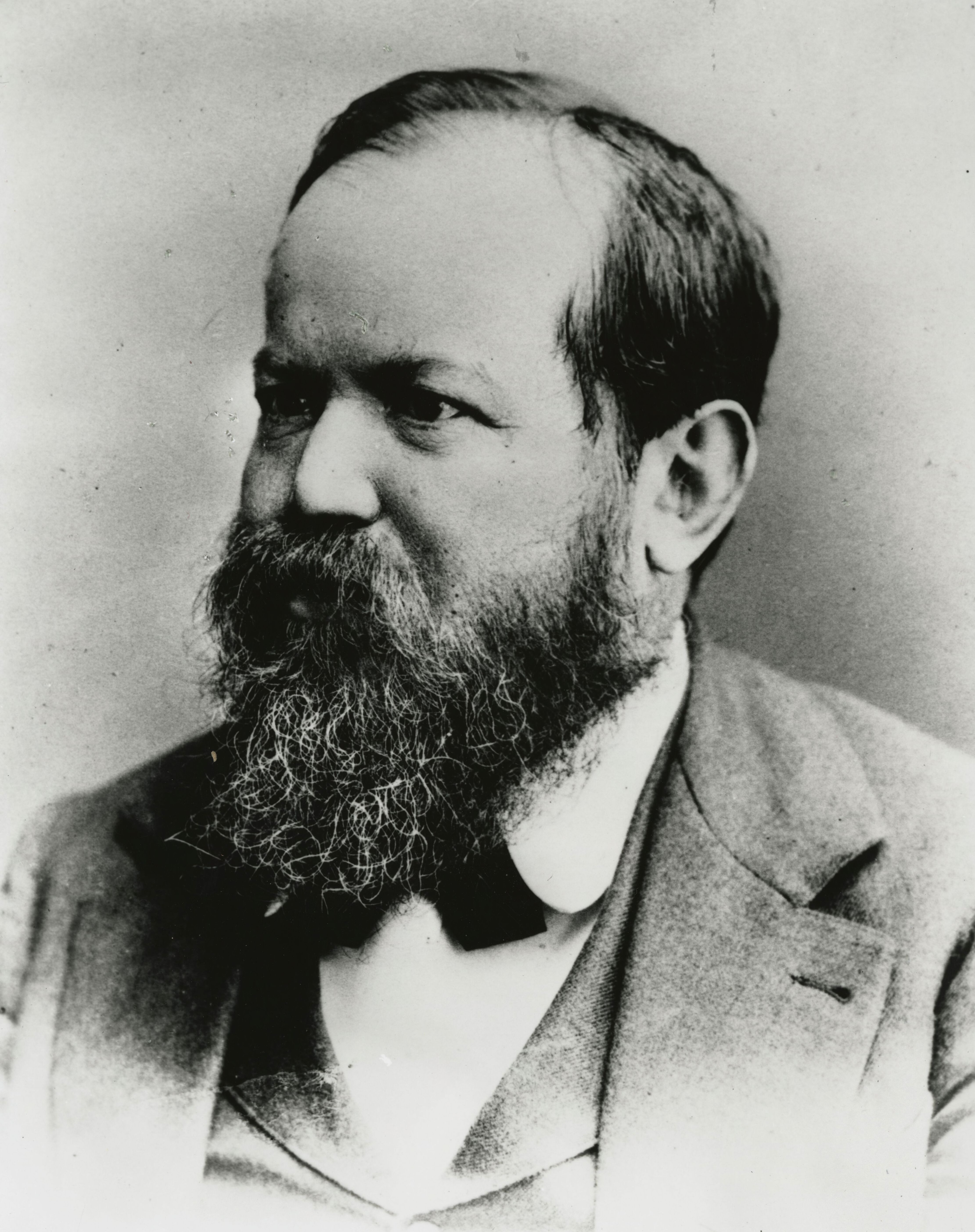
Wilhelm Steinitz

The shared winners of the tournament

The second international Vienna 1882 chess tournament was one of the longest and strongest chess tournaments ever played. According to the unofficial Chessmetrics ratings, the tournament was (as of March 2005) the strongest tournament in history, on the basis that nine of the ten top players in the world participated, including all of the top eight.

The Vienna Chess Society was formed in October 1857, and this tournament played from 10 May to 24 June 1882 was held on the occasion of its 25th anniversary. The main sponsors were Ignác Kolisch and the club's president Albert Salomon von Rothschild, who together donated 7500 francs to be split over the top six. Franz Joseph I of Austria was the patron of the event, who also donated a special prize of 2000 Austrian Gulden (Kaiserpreis). The time control was 15 moves per hour, with a 2-hour break after 4 hours. Games not completed after eight hours of play were adjourned to be finished on the rest day.

The tournament was played as a double round-robin tournament and suffered a number of withdrawals in the second tour. Noa withdrew after the first round of the second tour, Fleissig, Bird, Schwarz and Wittek also lost games by default. The event was won by Wilhelm Steinitz and Szymon Winawer, who decided to share the first prize after they each won a play-off game. The special prize was awarded to Zukertort for the best performance against the top three. On May 12, Steinitz drew a game with Mackenzie, thus ending the longest winning streak in chess history. Steinitz at the time had won 25 consecutive games, the last draw he conceded was nine years earlier, on August 3 in the Vienna 1873 tournament. After this Steinitz would lose three consecutive games to Zukertort, Hruby, and Ware.

== Standings ==
Vienna 1882, Second International Chess Tournament
#	Player	1	2	3	4	5	6	7	8	9	10	11	12	13	14	15	16	17	18	Total
1	Wilhelm Steinitz (Bohemia)	**	1½	½½	0½	½1	10	½½	11	01	1½	01	10	11	11	11	01	11	11	24.0
2	Szymon Winawer (Poland)	0½	**	00	1½	0½	10	11	10	01	1½	11	11	11	11	11	11	11	01	24.0
3	James Mason (Ireland)	½½	11	**	0½	½1	½½	½½	11	11	10	01	11	½1	1½	0½	11	01	½1	23.0
4	Johannes Hermann Zukertort (German Empire)	1½	0½	1½	**	½½	0½	0½	11	11	00	11	01	01	11	11	11	11	01	22.5
5	George Henry Mackenzie (United States)	½0	1½	½0	½½	**	10	½1	1½	½0	11	11	01	01	11	10	1½	11	11	22.5
6	Joseph Henry Blackburne (United Kingdom)	01	01	½½	1½	01	**	½½	0½	10	01	10	11	1½	11	10	11	01	11	21.5
7	Berthold Englisch (Austria)	½½	00	½½	1½	½0	½½	**	11	½0	½½	½½	0½	½½	01	11	11	11	½1	19.5
8	Louis Paulsen (German Empire)	00	01	00	00	0½	1½	00	**	½½	½1	½1	11	½1	½1	½1	11	½1	½1	18.5
9	Alexander Wittek (Hungary)	10	10	00	00	½1	01	½1	½½	**	½0	01	10	½½	½½	½1	1½	½1	11	18.0
10	Max Weiss (Hungary)	0½	0½	01	11	00	10	½½	½0	½1	**	0½	11	0½	0½	01	00	11	11	16.5
11	Vincenz Hruby (Bohemia)	10	00	10	00	00	01	½½	½0	10	1½	**	10	½½	11	01	10	01	11	16.0
12	Mikhail Chigorin (Russian Empire)	01	00	00	10	10	00	1½	00	01	00	01	**	11	00	11	1½	01	01	14.0
13	Adolf Schwarz (Hungary)	00	00	½0	10	10	0½	½½	½0	½½	1½	½½	00	**	½0	11	½0	01	11	14.0
14	Philipp Meitner (Austria)	00	00	0½	00	00	00	10	½0	½½	1½	00	11	½1	**	01	01	01	11	13.0
15	Henry Edward Bird (United Kingdom)	00	00	1½	00	01	01	00	½0	½0	10	10	00	00	10	**	11	½1	01	12.0
16	Preston Ware (United States)	10	00	00	00	0½	00	00	00	0½	11	01	0½	½1	10	00	**	01	11	11.0
17	Josef Noa (Hungary)	00	00	10	00	00	10	00	½0	½0	00	10	10	10	10	½0	10	**	½0	9.0
18	Bernhard Fleissig (Hungary)	00	10	½0	10	00	00	½0	½0	00	00	00	10	00	00	10	00	½1	**	7.0
