= Paul Lipke =

German chess player

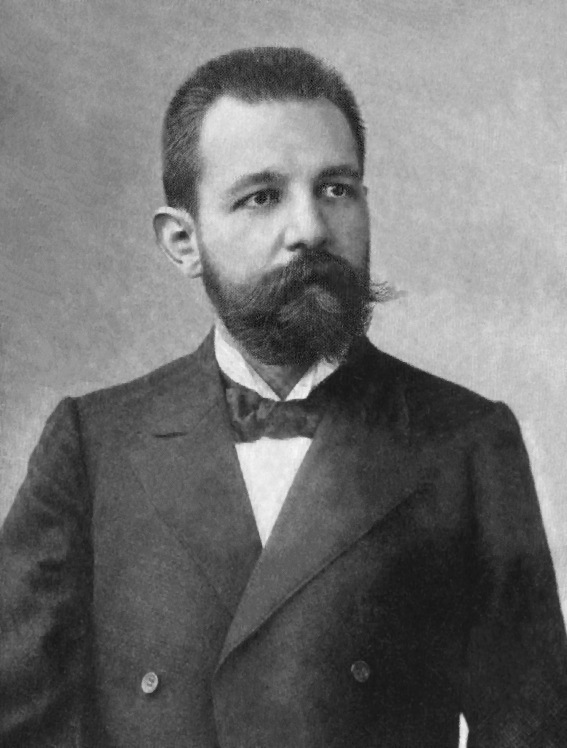
Paul Lipke

Paul Lipke (30 June 1870 – 8 March 1955) was a German chess master.

Lipke was born in Erfurt. In 1889, he tied for 5–6th in Breslau (6th DSB Congress, Hauptturnier A, Emanuel Lasker won), and took 4th in Dessau. In 1892, he won in Dresden (7th DSB-Kongress, Hauptturnier A), and he took 2nd in Halle (Quadrangular). In 1893, he took 3rd in Kiel (8th DSB-Kongress, Curt von Bardeleben and Carl August Walbrodt won). At the 9th DSB-Kongress in Leipzig, 1894, he took 2nd, behind Siegbert Tarrasch but ahead of several established masters, including Richard Teichmann, J. H. Blackburne, Carl Walbrodt, David Janowski and Georg Marco; he also won his individual game against Tarrasch. In 1898, he tied for 8–9th in Vienna (Kaiser-Jubiläumsturnier, Tarrasch and Harry Pillsbury won).

Lipke retired early from competitive chess, though he continued his involvement in the game at club level. In 1898, alongside Johann Berger, he was editor of the Deutsche Schachzeitung where he was in charge of the games section. Lipke was also involved in early editions of the Deutsche Schachblätter, published in Coburg from 1909. He worked as a lawyer in Halle, Saxony, and died at Osterburg, Altmark.
