= Vienna 1908 chess tournament =

The Internationales Schachturnier Wien 1908 was held in honour of the sixtieth anniversary of Franz Joseph I of Austria’s elevation as Emperor of Austria and King of Hungary. Twenty masters played at the Vienna Chess Club, from March 23 to April 17, 1908.

== Results and scores ==
Vienna 1908
Pos.	Player	1	2	3	4	5	6	7	8	9	10	11	12	13	14	15	16	17	18	19	20	Total
1-3	Géza Maróczy (Kingdom of Hungary)	x	½	1	½	½	½	½	1	½	1	½	1	1	1	0	1	1	1	½	1	14
1-3	Carl Schlechter (Austrian Empire)	½	x	½	½	½	½	½	1	1	½	1	1	½	1	1	1	½	1	½	1	14
1-3	Oldřich Duras (Austrian Empire)	0	½	x	0	½	½	1	½	1	½	1	1	1	1	1	1	1	1	1	½	14
4	Akiba Rubinstein (Russian Empire)	½	½	1	x	½	1	½	1	0	0	0	1	1	1	½	½	1	1	1	1	13
5	Richard Teichmann (German Empire)	½	½	½	½	x	½	½	½	½	0	1	½	½	1	½	1	1	½	1	1	12
6	Rudolf Spielmann (Austrian Empire)	½	½	½	0	½	x	1	½	½	½	1	1	0	0	½	1	½	1	1	1	11½
7-8	Julius Perlis (Austrian Empire)	½	½	0	½	½	0	x	0	½	1	1	0	1	½	½	1	1	½	1	1	11
7-8	Savielly Tartakower (Austrian Empire)	0	0	½	0	½	½	1	x	½	½	1	1	0	1	1	½	½	½	1	1	11
9-11	Paul Saladin Leonhardt (German Empire)	½	0	0	1	½	½	½	½	x	1	½	0	½	1	½	½	1	1	0	½	10
9-11	Jacques Mieses (German Empire)	0	½	½	1	1	½	0	½	0	x	0	0	1	1	1	½	½	1	0	1	10
9-11	Frank Marshall (United States)	½	0	0	1	0	0	0	0	½	1	x	½	1	0	½	1	1	1	1	1	10
12	Rudolf Swiderski (German Empire)	0	0	0	0	½	0	1	0	1	1	½	x	1	0	1	0	½	1	1	1	9½
13	Gersz Salwe (Russian Empire)	0	½	0	0	½	1	0	1	½	0	0	0	x	½	½	½	½	1	1	1	8½
14	Paul Johner (Switzerland)	0	0	0	0	0	1	½	0	0	0	1	1	½	x	1	½	0	0	1	1	7½
15	Johann Berger (Austrian Empire)	1	0	0	½	½	½	½	0	½	0	½	0	½	0	x	0	½	0	1	1	7
16-18	Hugo Süchting (German Empire)	0	0	0	½	0	0	0	½	½	½	0	1	½	½	1	x	½	0	½	½	6½
16-18	Curt von Bardeleben (German Empire)	0	½	0	0	0	½	0	½	0	½	0	½	½	1	½	½	x	0	½	1	6½
16-18	Simon Alapin (Russian Empire)	0	0	0	0	½	0	½	½	0	0	0	0	0	1	1	1	1	x	0	1	6½
19	Erich Cohn (German Empire)	½	½	0	0	0	0	0	0	1	1	0	0	0	0	0	½	½	1	x	1	6
20	Richard Réti (Kingdom of Hungary)	0	0	½	0	0	0	0	0	½	0	0	0	0	0	0	½	0	0	0	x	1½

== Literature ==
Marco, Georg "Internationales Schachturnier Wien 1908", Verlag der Wiener Schachzeitung, 1908
