= Ernst Flechsig =

German chess player (1852–1890)

Personal information
- Born: 5 October 1852 Bad Elster, Kingdom of Saxony
- Died: 11 October 1890 (aged 38)

Chess career
- Country: Germany

Ernst Flechsig (5 October 1852 – 11 October 1890) was a German chess master.

Flechsig was born in Bad Elster. He shared 2nd at Düsseldorf 1876 (the 10th Western German Chess Congress, Kongresse des Westdeutschen Schachbundes (WDSB), Wilfried Paulsen won), took 10th at Leipzig 1877 (the 3rd Central German Chess Congress, Kongresse des Mitteldeutschen Schachbundes (MDSB), Louis Paulsen won), and tied for 8-9th at Leipzig 1879 (the 1st German DSB Congress, Kongresse des Deutschen Schachbundes (DSB), Berthold Englisch won).

Dr. Ernst Flechsig won a game with Fritz Riemann at Breslau 1885 where he was the first player on record to play the Exchange Variation of the Nimzowitsch Defence.
