= Max Fleissig =

Austrian chess player (1845–1919)

Miksa (Max) Fleissig (10 November 1845 in Csenger – 23 January 1919) was a Hungarian-born Austrian chess master.

Fleissig tied for 7-8th in the Vienna 1873 chess tournament (Wilhelm Steinitz and Joseph Henry Blackburne won), played (scoring 5.5/12) at Vienna 1875 (Philipp Meitner won), and tied for 4-7th at Vienna 1882 (Vincenz Hruby won).

The Fleissig Gambit in the Sicilian Defence (1.e4 c5 2.d4 cxd4 3.c3) is named for him.

He was the elder brother of Bernhard Fleissig.
