= Karl Holländer =

German chess player

Karl Holländer (Hollaender, Hollander) (2 August 1868 – ?) was a German chess master.

He lived in Berlin, where he played in local tournaments. He tied for 11-12th in 1888 (Horatio Caro won), took 5th in 1889 (Theodor von Scheve won), was a winner ahead of Caro and Emil Schallopp in 1890, and shared 3rd in 1891/92 (Caro won).

Holländer won a match against Curt von Bardeleben (6.5 : 5.5) at Berlin 1891, and lost to Siegbert Tarrasch (0 : 4) at Nuremberg 1892.
