= Fritz Riemann =

German chess player

Fritz Riemann (2 January 1859, Weistritz, near Schweidnitz – 25 November 1932, Erfurt) was a German chess master.

Born in Silesia (then Prussia), he was a chess pupil of Adolf Anderssen in Breslau. In 1876, he won a match against Arnold Schottländer (5 : 0) there.

In 1879, he took 5th in Leipzig (1st DSB–Congress, Berthold Englisch won), and took 2nd in Wesselburen. In 1880, he took 2nd, behind Louis Paulsen, in Braunschweig (13th WSB–Congress), and drew a match with Emil Schallopp (+2 –2 =2) in Berlin. In 1881, he tied for 13-14th in Berlin (2nd DSB–Congress, Joseph Henry Blackburne won). In 1883, he tied for 6-7th in Nuremberg (3rd DSB–Congress, Szymon Winawer won). In 1885, he tied for 8-9th in Hamburg (4th DSB–Congress, Isidor Gunsberg won), and drew a match with Ernst Flechsig (+5 –5 =0) in Breslau. In 1888, he shared 1st with Curt von Bardeleben in Leipzig.

He wrote a book : Riemann, Fritz: Schach-Erinnerungen des jüngsten Anderssen-Schülers. Mit vielen Diagrammen im Text und einem Bildnis des Verfassers. de Gruyter, Berlin und Leipzig 1925.
