= Blackburne Shilling Gambit =

Position: a8 black rook, c8 black bishop, d8 black queen, e8 black king, f8 black bishop, g8 black knight, h8 black rook, a7 black pawn, b7 black pawn, c7 black pawn, d7 black pawn, f7 black pawn, g7 black pawn, h7 black pawn, e5 black pawn, c4 white bishop, d4 black knight, e4 white pawn, f3 white knight, a2 white pawn, b2 white pawn, c2 white pawn, d2 white pawn, f2 white pawn, g2 white pawn, h2 white pawn, a1 white rook, b1 white knight, c1 white bishop, d1 white queen, e1 white king, h1 white rook
- Moves: 1.e4 e5 2.Nf3 Nc6 3.Bc4 Nd4
- ECO: C50
- Origin: Wilhelm Steinitz, The Modern Chess Instructor, Part II, 1895
- Named after: Legend on Blackburne (see text)
- Parent: Italian Game
- Synonyms: Kostić Gambit; Shilling Gambit

The Blackburne Shilling Gambit is the name facetiously given to a dubious chess opening, derived from an offshoot of the Italian Game, that begins:

1. e4 e5
2. Nf3 Nc6
3. Bc4 Nd4?!

It is also sometimes referred to as the Kostić Gambit after the Serbian grandmaster Borislav Kostić, who played it in the early 20th century.

== History ==
Wilhelm Steinitz made the first known mention of this line, noting it in 1895 in the Addenda to his Modern Chess Instructor, Part II. The earliest game with the opening on chessgames.com, Dunlop–Hicks, New Zealand Championship, dates from 1911. Another early game, mentioned by Bill Wall, is Muhlock–Kostić, Cologne, 1912.

The trap beginning 4.Nxe5? "continues to catch victims, including two in successive rounds at Blackpool 1987".

== Analysis ==
Black's third move is a weak, time-wasting move. Steinitz recommended 4.0-0 or 4.Nxd4 in response. International Master Jeremy Silman writes that White has an advantage after 4.0-0 (Paul Keres gives 4.0-0 d6 5.Nxd4 exd4 6.c3 "with the better position".), 4.c3, or 4.Nc3. He recommends as best 4.Nxd4! exd4 5.c3 d5 6.exd5 Qe7+ 7.Kf1 +/=. If 5...dxc3, White has the initiative in the center after 6.Nxc3 d6 7.d4 +/−; if 5...Bc5?, Black loses a pawn to 6.Bxf7+ Kxf7 7.Qh5+ (Wolfgang Unzicker).

The only virtue of 3...Nd4 is that it sets a trap that has ensnared many players. After the natural 4.Nxe5?, Black wins material with 4...Qg5! Now the obvious 5.Nxf7?? loses to 5...Qxg2, for example 6.Rf1 Qxe4+ 7.Be2 Nf3#, a smothered mate. This trap is what gives the line its name; the great English master Joseph Henry Blackburne reputedly used it to win one shilling per game from café visitors. Wall has questioned this, however, stating that there are no recorded games of Blackburne playing this line.

The opening is often considered to not be a true gambit, since White cannot take the pawn on e5 without losing material; however, after 4.Nxe5 Qg5, White can maintain a playable game with 5.Bxf7+! Steinitz wrote that this move, "followed by castling, is now White's best chance and in some measure a promising one, considering that he has two Pawns and the attack for the piece". G. Chandler–NN, Stockbridge 1983, continued 5...Ke7 6.0-0 Qxe5 7.Bxg8 Rxg8 8.c3 Nc6 (Silman analyzes 8...Ne6 9.d4 Qf6 10.f4 when "with two pawns and an attack for the sacrificed piece, White’s compensation isn’t in doubt".) 9.d4 (=/∞ Keres) Qa5? 10.d5 Ne5? 11.Qh5! Nf7? 12.d6+! 1–0 (in light of 13.Qxa5). White's two pawns and rolling pawn center, combined with Black's misplaced king, give White strong compensation for the sacrificed bishop.

Graham Burgess writes that 3...Nd4 is also known as the "Oh my God!" trap, as for full effect, Black is supposed to make this exclamation, pretending to have accidentally blundered the e-pawn. Burgess condemns this behavior as unethical, and notes that the trap, if avoided, leaves White with a large advantage.

== See also ==
- List of chess openings
- List of chess openings named after people
