= Old Jewish Cemetery, Wrocław =

Cemetery in Wrocław, Poland

Old Jewish Cemetery Stary Cmentarz Żydowski
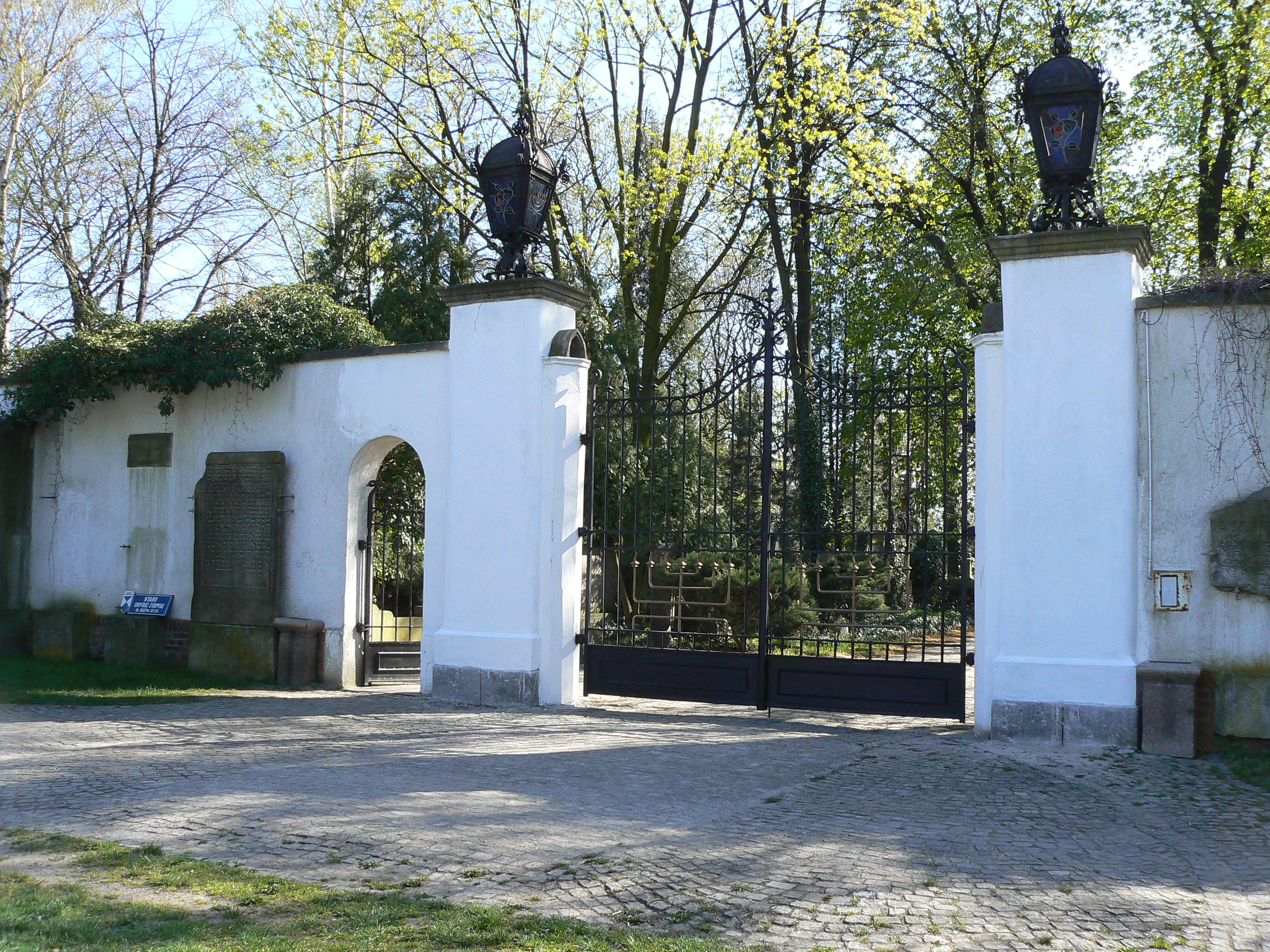
- Entrance gate
- Interactive map of Old Jewish Cemetery Stary Cmentarz Żydowski

Details
- Established: November 1856
- Location: 37/39 Ślężna Street, Wrocław
- Country: Poland
- Coordinates: 51°05′12″N 17°01′30″E
- Type: Jewish cemetery
- Owned by: City Museum of Wrocław
- Size: 4.6 ha
- No. of graves: Approximately 12,000
- Find a Grave: Old Jewish Cemetery Stary Cmentarz Żydowski

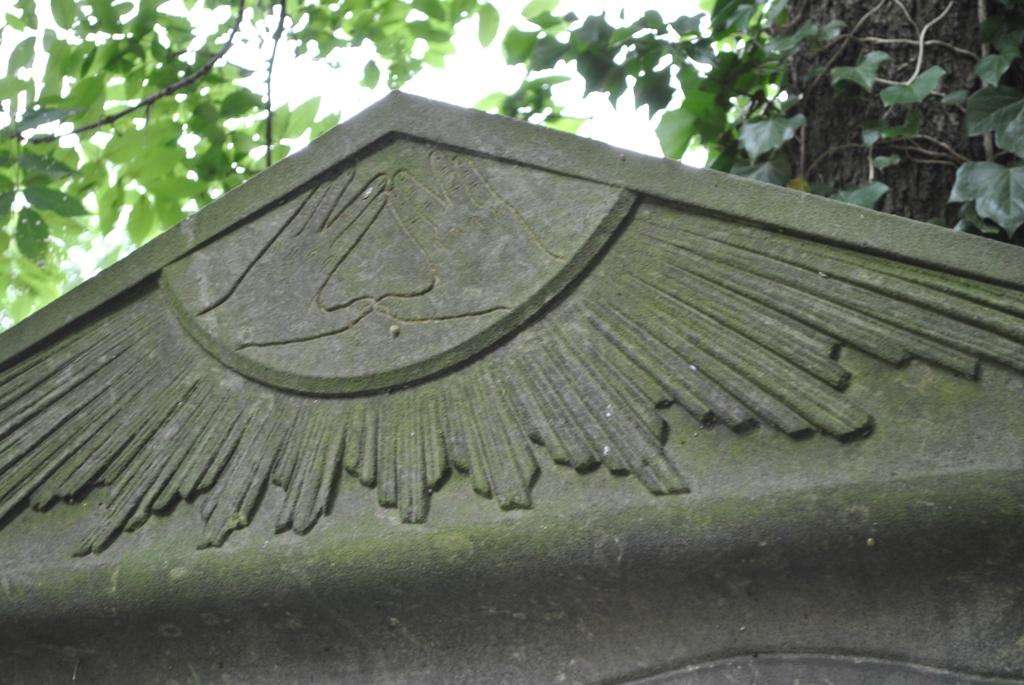
Hands motif

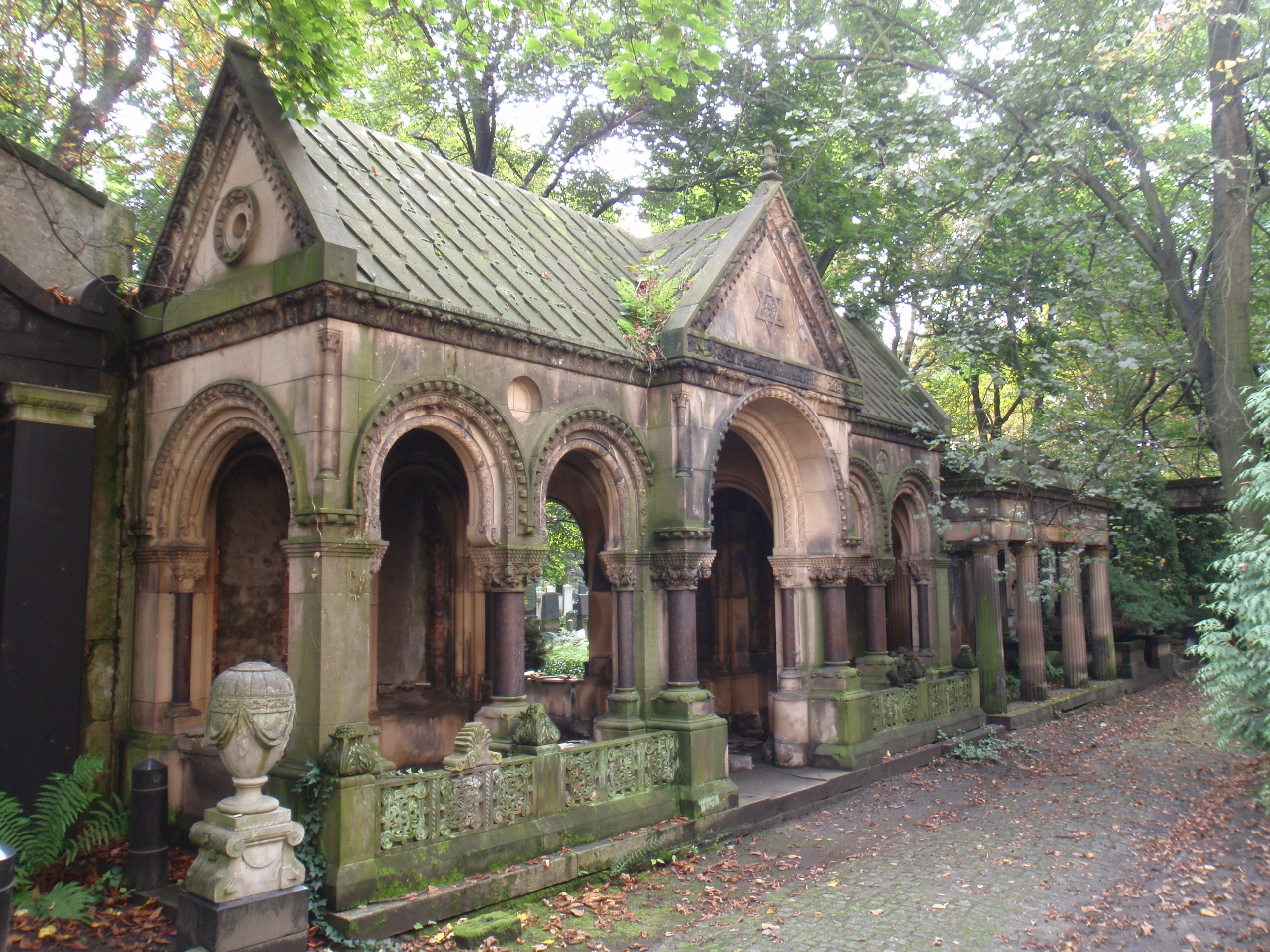
One of the monumental mausoleums in the cemetery

The Old Jewish Cemetery (Polish: Stary Cmentarz Żydowski we Wrocławiu) is a historic necropolis-museum situated on 37/39 Ślężna Street, in the southern part of Wrocław (formerly Breslau), Poland. Opened in 1856, the cemetery's eclectic layout features many architectural forms and styles on a monumental scale.

The current shape of the cemetery evolved mostly throughout the 19th century, during the times of the German Empire. The first burial took place in what was then the village of Gabitz (Gajowice), just outside city limits. The cemetery area was then expanded twice. In 1943, the burial ceremonies were abandoned and the necropolis was leased for five years to a gardening center. During World War II, the cemetery became a fierce battleground, the marks of which are still visible on many tombstones. It was inscribed into the register of city monuments in 1975.

== Architecture ==
Most of the cemetery objects were built in second half of the 19th century. They imitate various architectural styles including Ancient, the Middle Ages, Renaissance, Baroque. Great example of Ancient architecture are numerous columns located throughout the cemetery that are symbols of life and eternity. Columns imitating broken trees reflect the tragedy of fragile life and death. Tombstones are signed by bilingual inscriptions, most commonly German and Jewish.

Most common symbols of Jewish culture which can be seen on tombstones are:

- hands – on the tombstones of descendants of Aaron
- oriental tree – ancient symbol of messianic hope
- broken rose – motif of death
- helmet – army officer symbol
- palms – symbols of national sacrifice of Jews

== Notable people buried at the cemetery ==
- Isidor and Neander Alexander – banking family
- Leopold Auerbach – professor in biology and history at the University of Breslau (now University of Wrocław)
- Julius Cohn – professor of botanics
- Heinrich Graetz – professor of history at Wrocław University
- Friederike Kempner – writer
- Ferdinand Lassalle – thinker, labor leader, and social activist who stayed in close contact with Karl Marx and Friedrich Engels
- Ernst Steinitz – mathematician who studied and taught at the University of Breslau (now University of Wrocław)
- Arnold Schottländer – Chess Master

== Antisemitic incident ==
On July 30, 2010, the cemetery was desecrated with swastikas drawings and vulgar graffiti. In addition, some of the gravestones were broken.

== Picture gallery ==
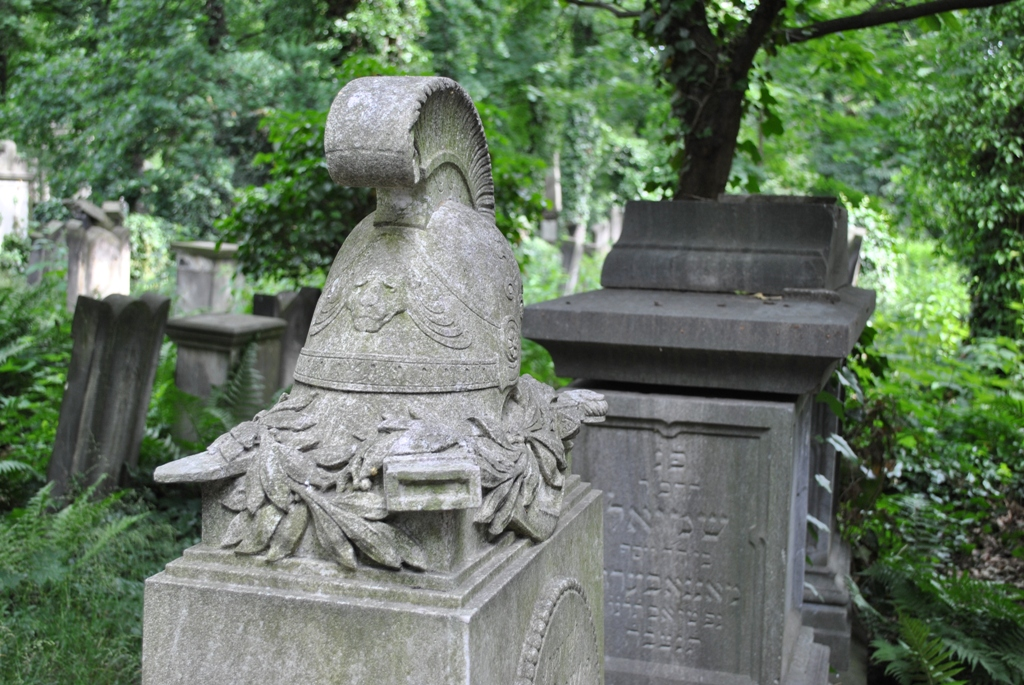
Helmet motif

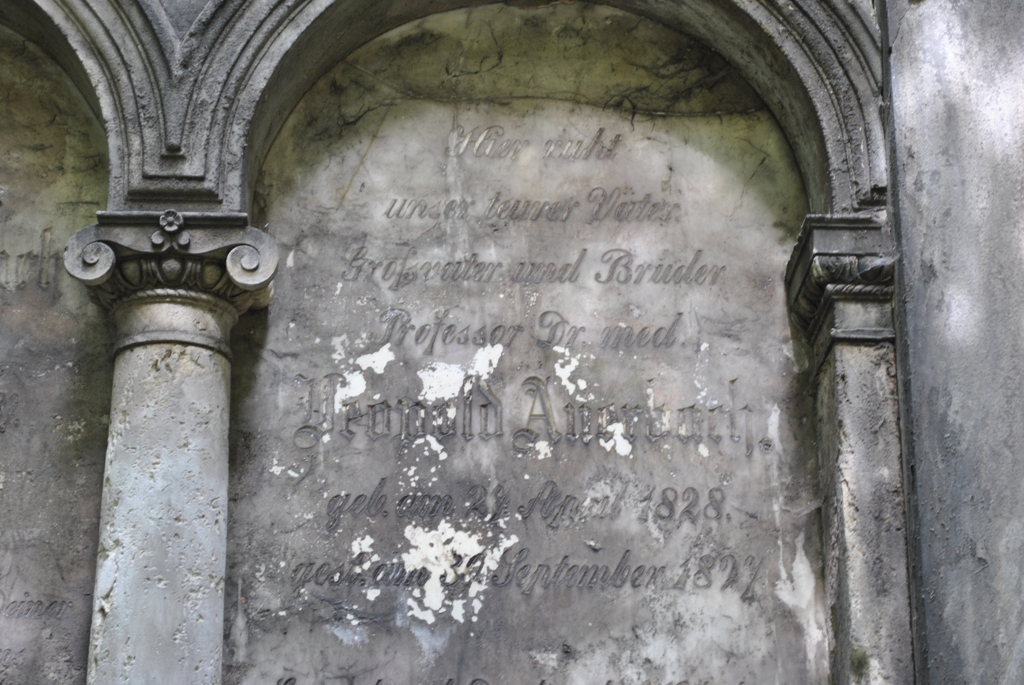
Leopold Aucherbach tombstone

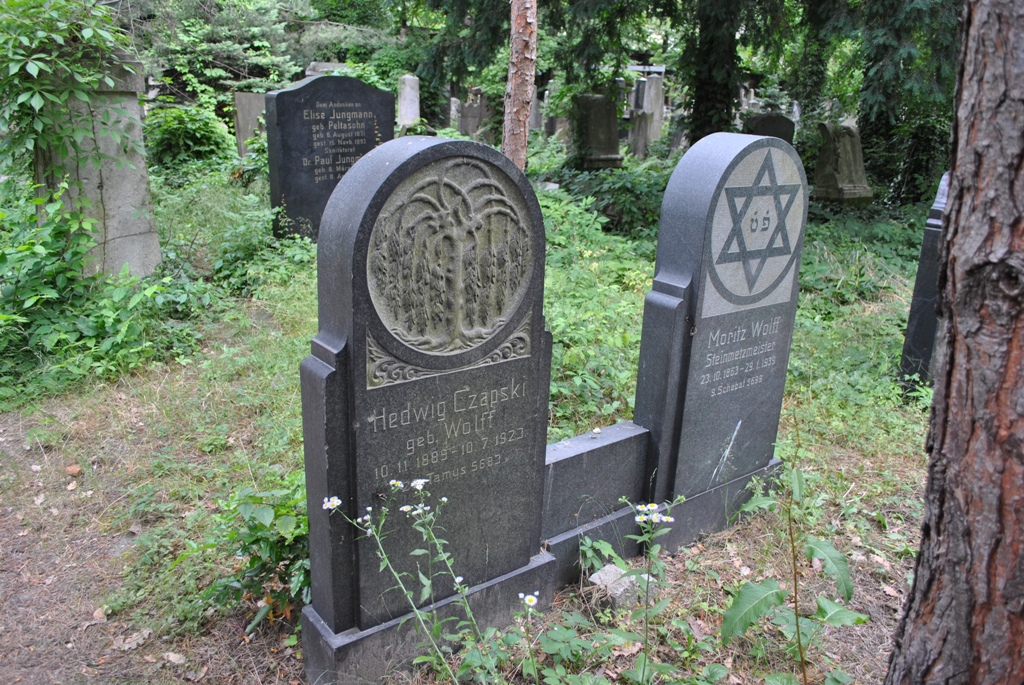
Oriental tree symbol

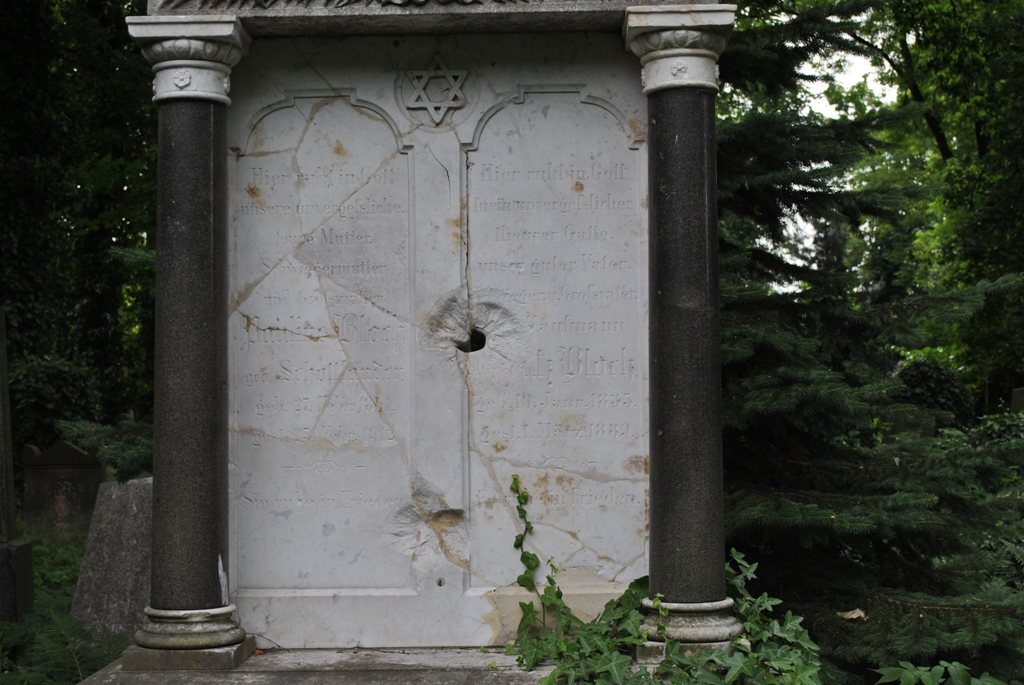
Tombstone destroyed during World War II

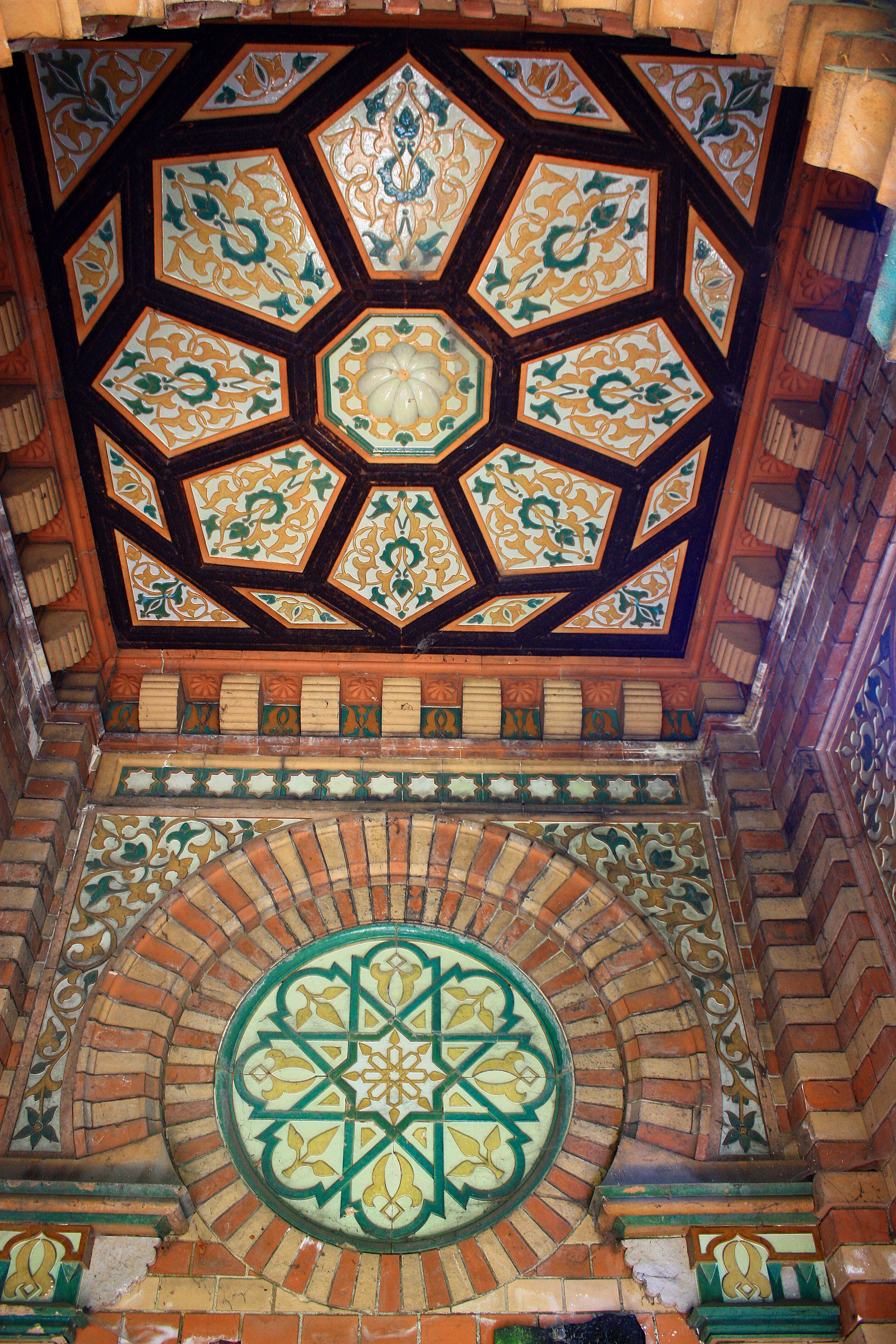
Exotic interior of a mausoleum

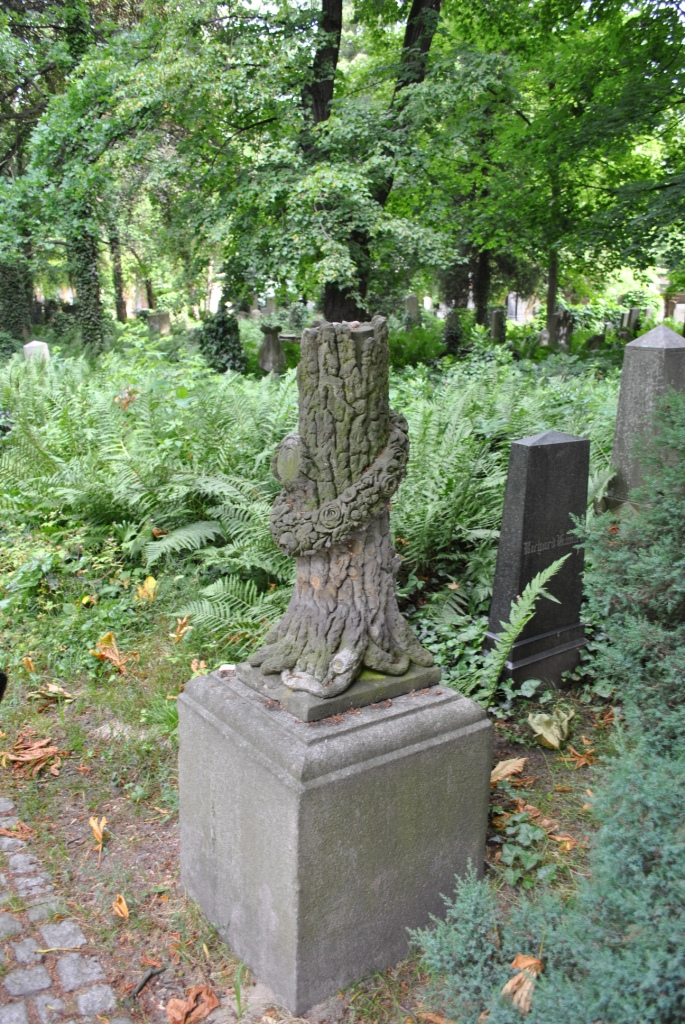
Broken tree motif

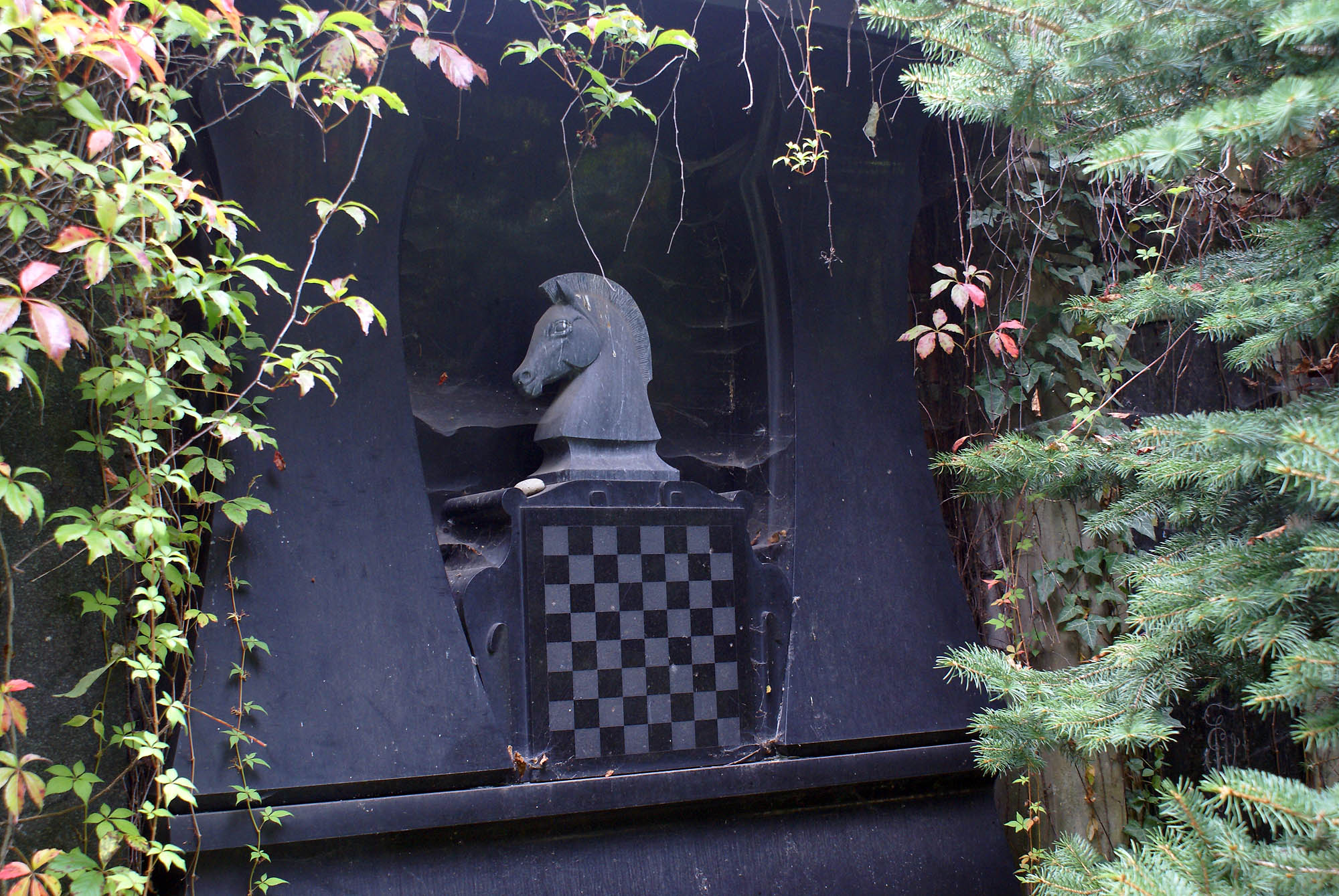
Grave of Arnold Schottländer adorned with a Chessboard and a Knight

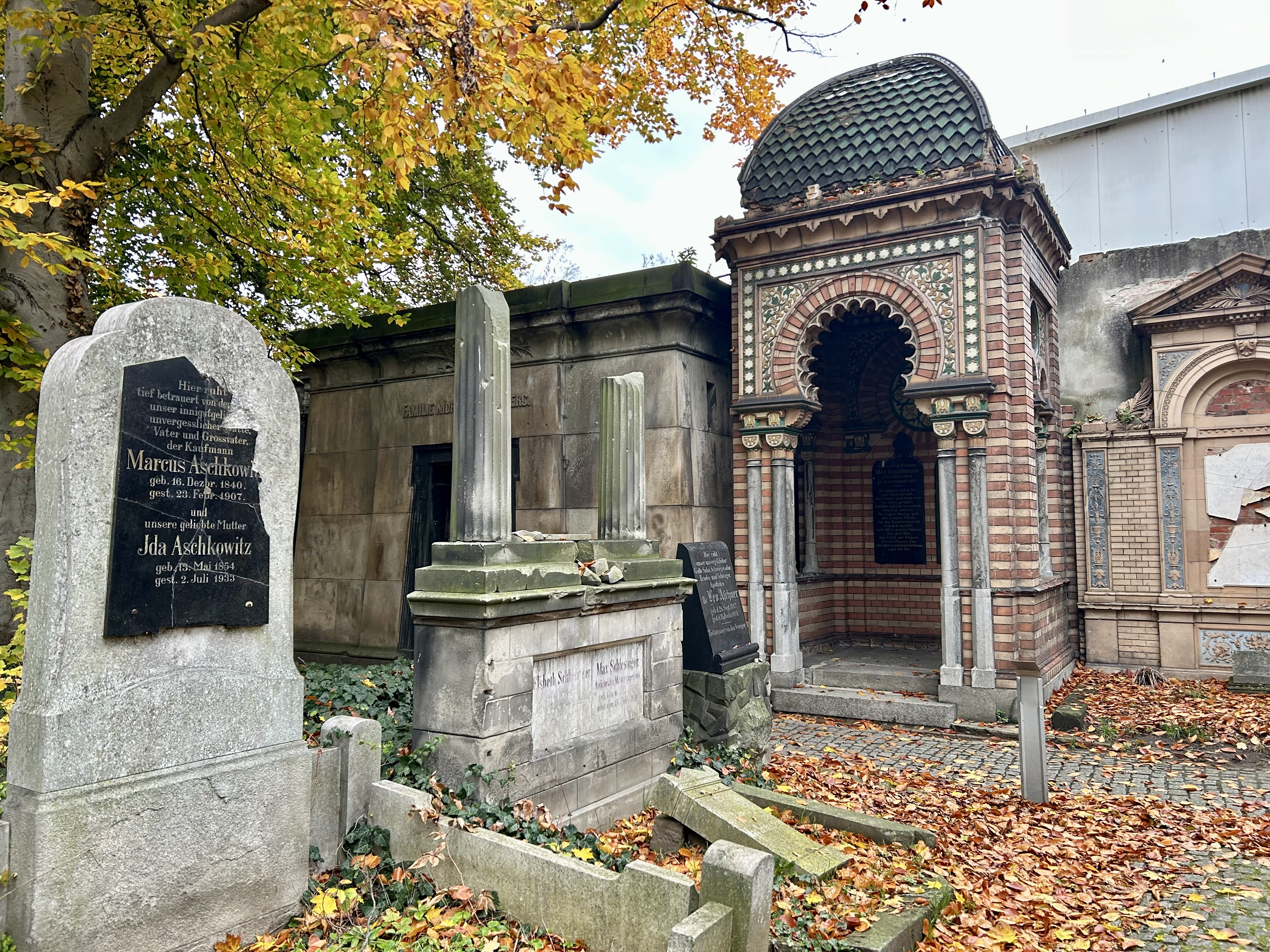
The Kaufmann family Moorish Revival tomb
