= Johannes Minckwitz (professor) =

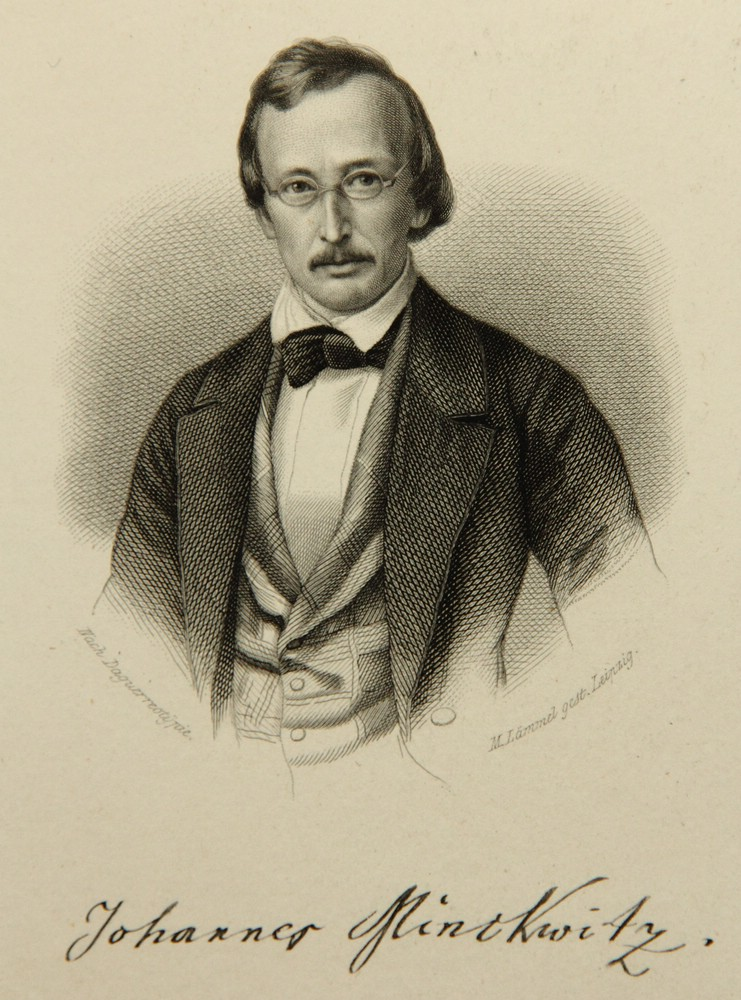

Johannes Minckwitz (21 January 1812 Lückersdorf – 29 December 1885 Neuenheim) was a German poet and classical scholar.

== Biography ==
He was educated at Leipzig University, was appointed professor there in 1861, and in 1883 moved to Heidelberg University.

== Work ==
He first gained fame by his translations into German of Homer, Aeschylus, Sophocles, Euripides, Aristophanes, Pindar, and Lucian. He also wrote Vorschule zum Homer ("Elementary Homer," 1863). In the field of German criticism, Minckwitz wrote Platen als Mensch und Dichter ("Platen, the person and the poet," 1836) and Leben Platens ("Life of Platen," 1838), and edited Platen's posthumous papers (1852); and he also published: Lehrbuch der deutschen Verskunst ("Textbook of German verse," 1844); a play, Der Prinzenraub ("Kidnapping of a prince," 1839); and a volume of popular poems (1847).

== Family ==
He was the father of chess player and writer Johannes Minckwitz.
