= Smothered mate =

Type of checkmate in chess

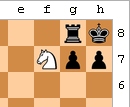
The end result of Philidor's mate: 1.Qg8+ Rxg8 2.Nf7#

In chess, a smothered mate (or informally, smother mate) is a checkmate delivered by a knight in which the mated king is unable to move because it is completely surrounded (or smothered) by its own pieces, which a knight can jump over.

The mate is usually seen in a corner of the board, since only three pieces are needed to surround the king there, less than anywhere else. The most common form of smothered mate is seen in the adjacent diagram. The knight on f7 delivers mate to the king on h8, which is prevented from escaping the check by the rook on g8 and the pawns on g7 and h7. Similarly, White can be mated with the white king on h1 and the knight on f2. Analogous mates on a1 and a8 are rarer because kingside castling is more common than queenside castling and brings the king closer to the corner.

== Methods ==
For a smothered mate to occur in a game, it is usually necessary to sacrifice material to compel pieces to smother the king – a player is unlikely to voluntarily surround their king with pieces in a way that makes a smothered mate possible.

=== Philidor's mate ===
Timman vs. Short, 1990

Position: e8 black rook, h8 black king, c7 black pawn, d7 white rook, e7 white pawn, g7 black pawn, h7 black pawn, c6 black pawn, a5 black pawn, f5 black pawn, g5 white knight, c4 white queen, g4 black knight, a3 black queen, g3 white pawn, a2 white pawn, e2 white pawn, f2 white pawn, h2 white pawn, g1 white king

Smothered mate after 27.Nf7+ Kg8 28.Nh6+ Kh8 29.Qg8+ Rxg8 30.Nf7#

Position: g8 black rook, h8 black king, c7 black pawn, d7 white rook, e7 white pawn, f7 white knight, g7 black pawn, h7 black pawn, c6 black pawn, a5 black pawn, f5 black pawn, g4 black knight, a3 black queen, g3 white pawn, a2 white pawn, e2 white pawn, f2 white pawn, h2 white pawn, g1 white king

Final position

Philidor's mate, also known as Philidor's legacy, is a checkmating pattern that ends in smothered mate. This method involves checking with the knight forcing the king out of the corner of the board, moving the knight away to deliver a double check from the queen and knight, sacrificing the queen to force the rook next to the king, then mating with the knight.

The technique is named after François-André Danican Philidor; this is something of a misnomer, however, as it is earlier described in Luis Ramirez Lucena's 1497 text on chess, Repetición de Amores e Arte de Axedrez, which predates Philidor by several hundred years.

An example is to be found in the game Jan Timman–Nigel Short at the 1990 Tilburg tournament. From the diagrammed position, play continued:

27. Nf7+ Kg8 28. Nh6+ Kh8 29. Qg8+ Rxg8 30. Nf7#

Note that White would force mate even if his rook, and pawn on e7, were removed from the board, and Black had a knight on f6. In that case, 27.Nf7+ Kg8 28.Nh6+ Kh8 (28...Kf8 29.Qf7#) 29.Qg8+ Nxg8 (or 29...Rxg8) 30.Nf7 still mates.

=== Opening traps ===
Position: a8 black rook, c8 black bishop, e8 black king, h8 black rook, a7 black pawn, b7 black pawn, c7 black pawn, d7 black pawn, e7 black queen, f7 black pawn, g7 black pawn, h7 black pawn, c6 black knight, b4 white pawn, c4 white pawn, f4 white bishop, d3 black knight, f3 white knight, b2 white pawn, d2 white knight, e2 white pawn, f2 white pawn, g2 white pawn, h2 white pawn, a1 white rook, d1 white queen, e1 white king, f1 white bishop, h1 white rook

Budapest mate

Occasionally, a smothered mate may be possible in the opening of a game. One of the most famous, and most frequently occurring, is in the Budapest Gambit. It arises after:

1. d4 Nf6 2. c4 e5 3. dxe5 Ng4 4. Bf4 Nc6 5. Nf3 Bb4+ 6. Nbd2 Qe7 7. a3 Ngxe5 8. axb4?? Nd3# (diagram)

Note that the knight cannot be taken because the pawn on e2 is pinned to the white king by the black queen on e7.

Position: a8 black rook, c8 black bishop, e8 black king, f8 black bishop, g8 black knight, h8 black rook, a7 black pawn, b7 black pawn, c7 black pawn, d7 black pawn, f7 white knight, g7 black pawn, h7 black pawn, e4 black queen, f3 black knight, a2 white pawn, b2 white pawn, c2 white pawn, d2 white pawn, e2 white bishop, f2 white pawn, h2 white pawn, a1 white rook, b1 white knight, c1 white bishop, d1 white queen, e1 white king, f1 white rook

Blackburne Shilling mate

Another notorious example is the so-called "Blackburne Shilling Gambit" (named after the 19th-century English player Joseph Henry Blackburne, supposedly because he used it to win shillings from amateurs). It goes:

1. e4 e5 2. Nf3 Nc6 3. Bc4 Nd4?! 4. Nxe5!? Qg5! 5. Nxf7?? Qxg2 6. Rf1 Qxe4+ 7. Be2 Nf3# (diagram)

There is also a well-known trap in the Caro–Kann Defence:

1. e4 c6 2. d4 d5 3. Nc3 dxe4 4. Nxe4 Nd7 5. Qe2!? Ngf6?? 6. Nd6#

This trap has occurred in many games, perhaps the earliest recorded example being Alekhine–Four Amateurs, simultaneous exhibition, Palma de Mallorca 1935.

== Examples from games ==
Lasker vs. Horowitz, 1946

Position: a8 black rook, c8 black bishop, f8 black rook, g8 black king, a7 black pawn, b7 black pawn, f7 black pawn, g7 black pawn, h7 black pawn, f6 black knight, e5 black queen, c4 white pawn, d3 black knight, a2 white pawn, b2 white pawn, d2 white knight, e2 white knight, f2 white pawn, g2 white pawn, h2 white pawn, a1 white rook, d1 white queen, e1 white king, f1 white bishop, h1 white rook

Final position

An example of a similar smothered mate in master-level play is the game Edward Lasker–Israel Horowitz, New York City 1946, which went:

1. d4 Nf6 2. Nf3 d5 3. e3 c5 4. c4 cxd4 5. Nxd4 e5 6. Nf3 Nc6 7. Nc3 d4 8. exd4 exd4 9. Nb5 Bb4+ 10. Bd2 0-0 11. Bxb4 Nxb4 12. Nbxd4 Qa5 13. Nd2 Qe5+ 14. Ne2 Nd3#
Unzicker vs. Sarapu, 1970

Position: a8 black rook, c8 black bishop, d8 black rook, g8 white queen, h8 black king, a7 black pawn, b7 black pawn, g7 black pawn, h7 black pawn, b6 black queen, d6 white knight, c4 white bishop, f4 black knight, a2 white pawn, b2 white pawn, c2 white pawn, g2 white pawn, h2 white pawn, a1 white rook, d1 white king, f1 white rook

Final position

Another example is the game Unzicker–Sarapu, Siegen Olympiad 1970:

1. e4 c5 2. Nf3 Nf6 3. e5 Nd5 4. Nc3 e6 5. Nxd5 exd5 6. d4 Nc6 7. dxc5 Bxc5 8. Qxd5 Qb6 9. Bc4 Bxf2+ 10. Ke2 0-0 11. Rf1 Bc5 12. Ng5 Nd4+ 13. Kd1 Ne6 14. Ne4 d6 15. exd6 Bxd6?? 16. Nxd6 Rd8 17. Bf4! Nxf4? 18. Qxf7+ Kh8 19. Qg8+!

Sarapu now resigned in light of 19...Rxg8 20.Nf7#.

Cochrane vs. Bannerjee, 1855

Position: c8 black rook, d8 black queen, g8 black rook, h8 black king, a7 black pawn, b7 black pawn, e7 black pawn, f7 white knight, g7 black bishop, h7 black pawn, g6 black pawn, a5 black knight, b5 white rook, d4 white pawn, a3 white bishop, e3 white pawn, a2 white pawn, e2 black bishop, f2 white pawn, g2 white pawn, h2 white pawn, f1 white rook, g1 white king

Final position

Maybe the finest example of smothered mate utilizing the knight is from Barrister John Cochrane–Moheschunder "the Brahmin" Bannerjee in Calcutta, British India 1855:

1. d4 Nf6 2. c4 g6 3. Nc3 d5 4. e3 Bg7 5. Nf3 0-0 6. cxd5 Nxd5 7. Be2 Nxc3 8. bxc3 c5 9. 0-0 cxd4 10. cxd4 Nc6 11. Bb2 Bg4 12. Rc1 Rc8 13. Ba3 Qa5 14. Qb3 Rfe8 15. Rc5 Qb6 16. Rb5 Qd8 17. Ng5 Bxe2 18. Nxf7 Na5 19. Nh6+ Kh8 20. Qg8+ Rxg8 21. Nf7# 1–0

== See also ==
- Checkmate patterns
