= Johannes Minckwitz =

German chess player (1843–1901)

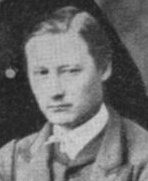
Johannes Minckwitz.

Johannes Minckwitz (April 11, 1843 – May 20, 1901) was a German chess player and author.

== Origins ==
Born in Leipzig, he was the son of German classical scholar and author Johannes Minckwitz.

== Chess play ==
His best achievement was 2nd place, behind Adolf Anderssen, at Barmen 1869 (8th WDSB–Congress). He tied for 3rd-5th at Hamburg 1869 (2nd NDSB–Congress, Anderssen won); tied for 8-9th at Baden-Baden 1870 (Anderssen won); took 3rd at Krefeld 1871 (9th WDSB–Congress, Louis Paulsen won); took 4th at Frankfurt 1878 (12th WDSB–Congress, L. Paulsen won); took 11th at Leipzig 1879 (1st DSB Congress, Berthold Englisch won).

He shared 1st with Max Weiss and Adolf Schwarz at Graz 1880; tied for 3rd-5th at Braunschweig 1880 (13th WDSB–Congress, L. Paulsen won); took 8th at Wiesbaden 1880 (Joseph Henry Blackburne, A. Schwarz and B. Englisch won); tied for 7-8th at Berlin 1881 (2nd DSB–Congress, Blackburne won); took 10th at Hamburg (4th DSB–Congress, Isidor Gunsberg won); tied for 13-14th at Breslau (6th DSB–Congress, Siegbert Tarrasch won), and took 9th at Berlin 1890 (Emanuel Lasker and Berthold Lasker won).

== Last years and death ==
Around 1883, he began to show symptoms of mental illness for which he was hospitalized several times. On May 15, 1901, he threw himself under an electric train, losing both his arms, and died five days later in Biebrich.

== Chess literature ==
In 1865–1876 and 1879–1886, he was an editor of the Deutsche Schachzeitung and author of Das ABC des Schachspiels (Leipzig 1879), Humor in Schachspiel (Leipzig 1885) and Der kleine Schachkönig (Leipzig 1889).
