= Carl August Walbrodt =

German chess player

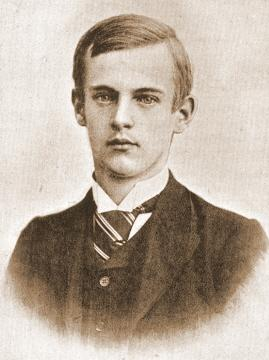
Carl August Walbrodt.

Carl August Walbrodt (November 28, 1871, Amsterdam – October 3, 1902, Berlin) was a German chess master.

Walbrodt's parents, along with his older brother, moved from Wesel, Rhine Province to Amsterdam shortly before Carl August was born. They then moved back to the Berlin area before he was 10 years old. At that age his father taught him to play chess. When they originally moved to Amsterdam, Walbrodt's parents were very poor, but by 1881, they had acquired enough money to pay for his schooling. By the mid-1890s Walbrodt and his brother owned a small factory making pantographs.

In 1890 he took 5th in Berlin (Horatio Caro won). In 1890/91, he took 2nd= (3rd after a play-off) in Berlin (Richard Teichmann won). In 1892 he tied for 4–5th in Dresden (the 7th DSB Congress, Siegbert Tarrasch won). He tied for 1st with Curt von Bardeleben at Kiel 1893 (the 8th DSB Congress). In 1894, he tied for 4–5th in Leipzig (the 9th DSB Congress, Tarrasch won). He took 11th at Hastings 1895.

In 1896, he took 2nd behind von Bardeleben and ahead of Jacques Mieses in Berlin (Triangular), tied for 7–8th in Nuremberg (Emanuel Lasker won), and tied for 6–7th in Budapest (Rudolf Charousek and Mikhail Chigorin tied for first). In 1897, he took 2nd behind Charousek in Berlin, and took 5th in Berlin (Bardeleben won). He took 15th in the Vienna 1898 chess tournament (Pillsbury and Tarrasch won).

Walbrodt played 15 matches from 1890 to 1898. The result of his first match, against Karl Holländer (1890), is unknown. He won against Emil Schallopp at Berlin 1891, Hermann Keidanski at Berlin 1891, von Bardeleben at Berlin 1892, Eugene Delmar at New York 1893, Alfred Ettlinger at New York 1893, Andrés Clemente Vázquez at Havana 1893, Wilhelm Cohn at Berlin 1894, Kuerschner at Nuremberg 1898, Haeusler, drew with Theodor von Scheve at Berlin 1891, Mieses at Berlin 1894, and lost to Pillsbury (+0 –2 =1) at Boston 1893, Tarrasch (+0 –7 =1) at Nuremberg 1894, and Dawid Janowski (+2 –4 =2) at Berlin 1897.

He was very active in giving simultaneous displays, teaching chess, and attending chess events. Walbrodt also founded two chess clubs and wrote a chess column in the Berliner Lokal-Anzeiger from about September 1899 until February 1902.

According to the Oxford Companion to Chess, he was diagnosed with tuberculosis in the early 1890s. He died from that disease at the age of 30.
