= Bernhard Fleissig =

Austrian chess player (1853–1931)

Bernhard (Bernát) Fleissig (1853 in Austrian Empire – 7 March 1931 in Vienna) was an Austrian chess master.

Fleissig took 18th in the Vienna 1882 chess tournament (Wilhelm Steinitz and Szymon Winawer won), took 2nd, behind Vincenz Hruby, at Vienna 1882, and tied for 2nd-3rd with Johann Hermann Bauer before losing a play-off match to him (0–2) at Vienna 1890 (Max Weiss won).

The Fleissig Variation in the Scotch Game (1.e4 e5 2.Nf3 Nc6 3.d4 exd4 4.Nxd4 Bc5 5.Be3 Qf6 6.c3 Nge7 7.Nc2) is named for him.

Fleissig was the younger brother of Max Fleissig.
