= Rudolf von Gottschall =

German poet, dramatist, literary critic and literary historian

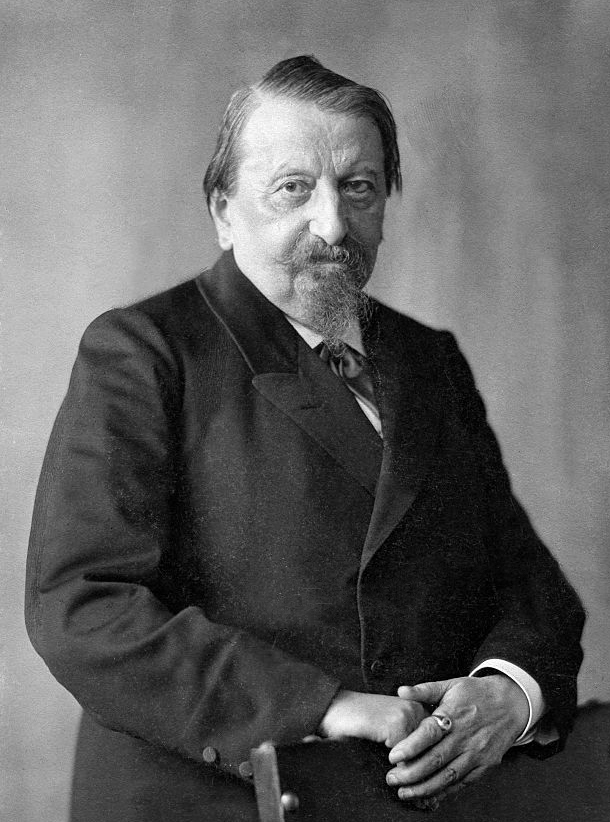
- Rudolf Gottschall by Nicola Perscheid, 1905
- Born: 30 September 1823; Breslau, Prussia
- Died: 21 March 1909 (aged 85); Leipzig, Germany
- Children: Hermann von Gottschall

Rudolf Gottschall (von Gottschall since 1877; 30 September 1823 – 21 March 1909) was a German poet, dramatist, literary critic and literary historian.

== Biography ==
He was born at Breslau, the son of a Prussian artillery officer. He was educated at the gymnasia in Mainz and Coburg, and subsequently at Rastenburg in East Prussia. In 1841 he entered the University of Königsberg as a law student, but was expelled for his outspoken liberal opinions. The academic authorities at Breslau and Leipzig were equally intolerant towards him, and it was only in Berlin that he found himself free to pursue his studies. During this period he issued Lieder der Gegenwart (“Songs of the present,” 1842) and Zensurflüchtlinge (“Refugees from censoring,” 1843) - the poetical fruits of his political enthusiasm. He completed his studies in Berlin, and took the degree of doctor juris in Königsberg.

His political views continued to stand in the way of his career, and Gottschall gave up the law to devote himself entirely to literature. He met with immediate success, and beginning as a dramaturge in Königsberg with Der Blinde von Alcala (1846) and Lord Byron in Italien (1847), he went on to Hamburg where he occupied a similar position. His political and social sympathies with the revolutionary movement of 1848 were shown in the dramas Wiener Immortellen (1848), Lambertine von Méricourt (1850), and Ferdinand von Schill (1851), as well as in his first collection of poems, Gedichte (1850), and in a lyric epic, Die Göttin, ein hohes Lied vom Weibe (1853).

In 1852 he married Marie, baroness von Seherr-Thoss, and for the next few years lived in Silesia. From this time on, his work became more serene in temper and style. An epic, Carlo Zeno, was followed by a very successful historical comedy (after the style of Scribe), Pitt und Fox (1854), and this by literary and historical studies, whose final titles were: Die deutsche National Litteratur des XIX. Jahrhunderts (1892) and Poetik: Die Dichtkunst und ihre Formen (1858).

In 1862 he took over the editorship of a newspaper, but in 1864 moved to Leipzig. Gottschall was raised, in 1877, by the king of Prussia to the hereditary nobility with the prefix "von," having been previously made a Geheimer Hofrat by the Grand Duke of Weimar. Down to 1887 Gottschall edited the Brockhaussche Blätter für litterarische Unterhaltung and the monthly periodical Unsere Zeit. He died at Leipzig.

Gottschall was also a noted chess player. The Deutschen Schachbund (DSB) was founded in Leipzig on 18 July 1877 by athletes and intellectuals such as Adolf Anderssen, Rudolf Gottschall, Hermann Zwanziger, Max Lange and Carl Göring. When the next meeting took place on 15 July 1879 in Leipzig (the 1st DSB Congress), sixty-two clubs had become member of the German Chess Federation (DSB). Hofrat von Gottschall became chairman and Zwanziger the General Secretary.

== Works ==
Gottschall's prolific literary productions cover the fields of poetry, novel-writing and literary criticism. Among his volumes of lyric poetry are Sebastopol (1856), Janus (1873), Bunte Blüten (1891). Among his epics, Carlo Zeno (1854), Maja (1864), dealing with an episode in the Indian Mutiny, and Merlins Wanderungen (1887). Pitt und Fox (1854) was never surpassed by his other lighter dramas, among which may be mentioned Die Welt des Schwindels and Der Spion von Rheinsberg. The tragedies, Mazeppa, Catharine Howard, Amy Robsart and Der Gotze von Venedig, were very successful; and the historical novels, Im Banne des schwarzen Adlers (1875; 4th ed., 1884), Die Erbschaft des Blutes (1881), Die Tochter Rübezahls (1889), and Verkümmerte Existenzen (1892), enjoyed a high degree of popularity. His Die deutsche Nationalliteratur des 19. Jahrhunderts (1855), and Poetik (1858) commanded the respect of all students of literature. Of his many novels, the first, Im Baune des schwarzen Adlers (1876), is considered by many critics his best. Gottschall was active as an editor and compiler of anthologies.

Gottschall's collected Dramatische Werke appeared in 12 vols. in 1880 (2nd ed., 1884); he also later published many volumes of collected essays and criticisms. See his autobiography, Aus meiner Jugend (1898).
