= Vincenz Hruby =

Czech chess player (1856–1917)

Vincenc Hrubý (9 September 1856 – 16 July 1917, Trieste) was a Czech chess master.

He was born in Krivsoudov (Bohemia). Hrubý worked as a teacher at a secondary school (Realschule) in Trieste. He died there as well.

His best results were in 1880s and 1890s. In the International Chess Tournament at Vienna 1882, won by Wilhelm Steinitz and Szymon Winawer, he finished 11th. He won, ahead of Bernhard Fleissig, at the Vienna Chess Club tournament 1882, and tied for 10–11th at Nuremberg 1883 (the 3rd DSB Congress, Winawer won).

He won matches in Vienna against Berthold Englisch (3.5 : 1.5) in 1882, and Adolf Albin (5.5 : 3.5) in 1891.
