= Emil Schallopp =

German chess master and author (1843–1919)

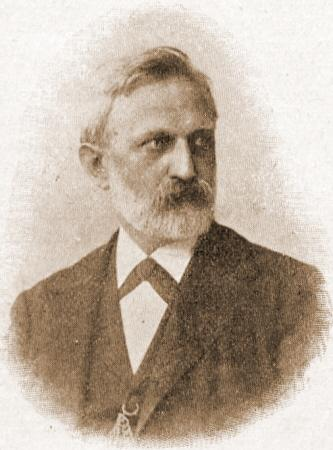
Emil Schallopp

Emil Schallopp (1 August 1843, Friesack, Germany – 9 April 1919, Berlin) was a German chess master and author. He became head of the shorthand department of the Reichstag. He wrote many books, including one on the Steinitz–Zukertort 1886 World Championship match. He is best known today as an author, particularly of the seventh edition (1891) of the Handbuch des Schachspiels.

== Tournaments ==
Schallopp played in many international chess tournaments, especially in the 1880s, although he never won an important event. He placed fourth at Wiesbaden 1880, after Joseph Henry Blackburne, Berthold Englisch, and Adolf Schwarz, and ahead of James Mason, Szymon Winawer, Louis Paulsen, and nine others. He placed second at Nottingham 1886 to Amos Burn, and received the best game prize for his encounter with Zukertort.

== Legacy ==
The Schallopp Defense to the King's Gambit Accepted (1.e4 e5 2.f4 exf4 3.Nf3 Nf6) is named after him.

The Schallopp Defense variation of the Slav Defense is named after him.
