= Rudolf Swiderski =

German chess player (1878–1909)

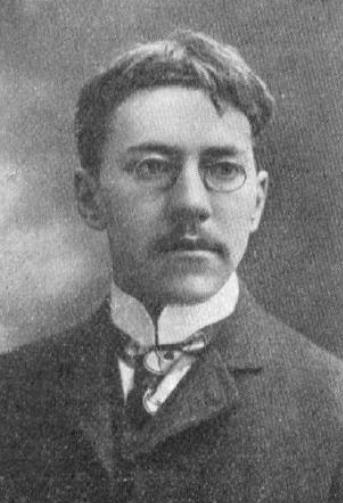
Rudolf Swiderski

Rudolf Swiderski (July 28, 1878 in Leipzig – August 2, 1909 in Leipzig) was a German chess master.

He took 6th at Eisenach 1896 (Hauptturnier), took 2nd at Annaberg 1897, tied for 7-8th at Berlin 1897, and tied for 3-6th in Amsterdam. He made his mark in 1900 when he won 1st place at the Munich Hauptturnier. After this he played in several major tournaments.

In 1902, he tied for 7-8th in Hanover (13th DSB Congress; Dawid Janowski won). In 1903, he took 8th in Vienna (King's Gambit theme tournament; Mikhail Chigorin won). In 1904, he took 6th in the Monte Carlo chess tournament (Géza Maróczy won). In 1904, he tied for 1st-2nd with Frank Marshall in Monte Carlo (Rice Gambit theme tournament). In 1904, he tied for 1st-3rd with Curt von Bardeleben and Carl Schlechter in Coburg (14th DSB Congress).

In 1905, he tied for 4-5th in Scheveningen (Marshall won). In 1905, he took 2nd, behind Leo Fleischmann in Barmen (B tourn). In 1906, he took 13th in Nuremberg (15th DSB Congress; Marshall won). In 1906, he tied for 12-13th in Ostend (Schlechter won). In 1907, he took 17th in Ostend (B tournament; Akiba Rubinstein and Ossip Bernstein won). In 1908, he took 12th in Vienna (Oldřich Duras, Maróczy and Schlechter won). In 1908, he tied for 14-15th in Düsseldorf (16th DSB Congress; Marshall won). In 1909, he won in Leipzig.

He committed suicide shortly after his 31st birthday allegedly because he could not face an operation. Although many reference books refer to his death date as August 12, 1909, the Washington Post for that morning contained an August 11 dispatch of his death. The Trenton (N.J.) Evening Times of August 11, 1909, reported "The body of M. Swiderski, the noted chess player, who committed suicide on August 2 was found today in the room where he had poisoned himself and then fired a bullet into this head. The body was badly decomposed. The date of the suicide was determined by a note left by Swiderski. Swiderski was recently convicted of perjury in a trial that involved him in a disgraceful scandal."
