= Adolf Schwarz =

Austro-Hungarian chess player (1836–1910)

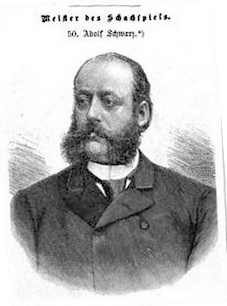
Portrait of Adolf Schwarz

Adolf Schwarz (31 October 1836, Gálszécs, Hungary, now Sečovce, Slovakia – 25 October 1910, Vienna) was an Austro-Hungarian chess master.

He took 10th in the Vienna 1873 chess tournament (Wilhelm Steinitz and Joseph Henry Blackburne won). In 1878, he took 2nd, behind Louis Paulsen, in Frankfurt. In 1879, he took 3rd in Leipzig (1st DSB-Congress, Berthold Englisch won). In 1880, he tied for 1st–3rd with Blackburne and Englisch in Wiesbaden. In 1880, he tied for 1st–3rd with Max Weiss and Johannes Minckwitz in Graz. In 1880, he tied for 3rd–5th in Braunschweig. In 1882, he took 3rd in Vienna (Vincenz Hruby won), and tied for 12–13th in the Vienna 1882 chess tournament (Wilhelm Steinitz and Szymon Winawer won).

Adolf Schwarz won matches against Minkwitz (+3 -2 =4) in 1878, and against Winawer (+3 -1 =0) in 1880.
