= Joseph Henry Blackburne =

British chess player (1841–1924)

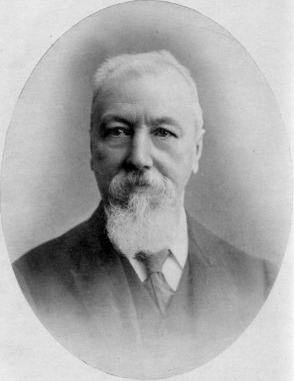
- Born: 10 December 1841; Manchester, England
- Died: 1 September 1924 (aged 82); London, England
- Other name: "The Black Death"
- Occupation: Chess player
- Years active: 1862–1914

Joseph Henry Blackburne (10 December 1841 – 1 September 1924) was a British chess player. Nicknamed "The Black Death", he dominated the British scene during the latter part of the 19th century. Blackburne learned the game at the relatively late age of 17 or 18, but he quickly became a strong player and went on to develop a professional chess career that spanned over 50 years. At one point he was one of the world's leading players, with a string of tournament victories behind him, and popularised chess by giving simultaneous and blindfold displays around the country. Blackburne also published a collection of his own games.

== Biography ==
Joseph Henry Blackburne was born in Manchester in December 1841. He learned how to play draughts as a child, but when he was aged 17 or 18, he heard about Paul Morphy's exploits around Europe, and he switched to playing chess:

I learnt the game in, say, 1859.

— Blackburne

Blackburne joined the Manchester Chess Club in 1861. In July 1861 he lost 5–0 in a match with Manchester's strongest player, Eduard Pindar (and champion of the Provinces), but in August/September, Blackburne defeated Pindar (five wins, two draws, one loss). By the next year, Blackburne became champion of the city club, ahead of Bernhard Horwitz (who taught him endgame theory).

Blackburne's introduction to blindfold chess was a little later. In November 1861, Louis Paulsen gave a simultaneous blindfold exhibition in Manchester, beating Blackburne among others; Blackburne was soon thereafter playing chess blindfolded with three players simultaneously.

=== Competitive chess ===
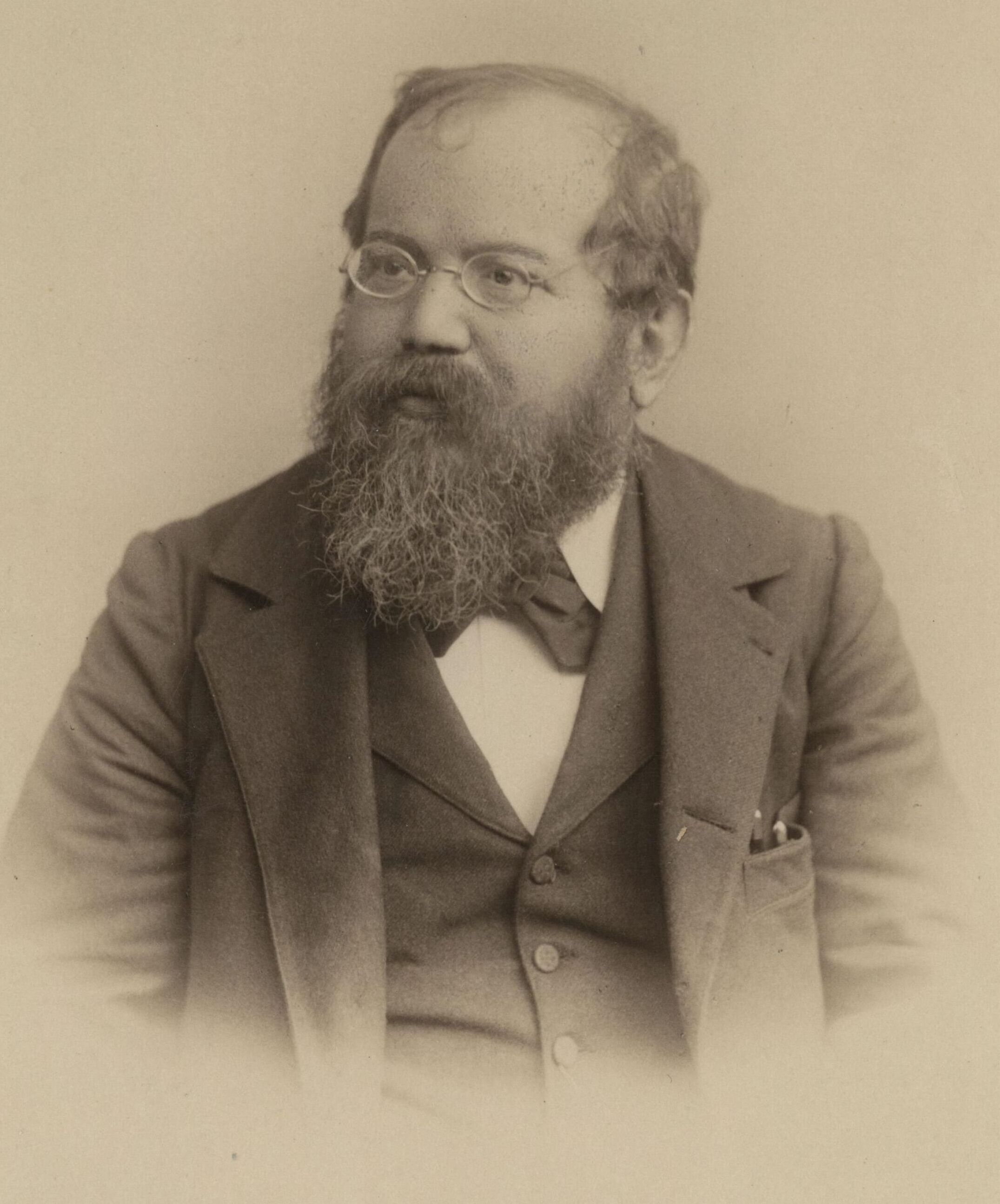
Blackburne's contemporary Wilhelm Steinitz dominated chess in the 1870s and 1880s

Less than three years after learning the moves to chess, Blackburne entered the 1862 London International Tournament (the world's first chess round-robin or all-play-all tournament) and defeated Wilhelm Steinitz in their individual game, although Blackburne finished in 9th place. Up to that point, timekeeping was measured with hourglasses, and it was Blackburne who suggested chess clocks. This trip cost Blackburne his job back in Manchester (accounts vary about what it was), and he became a professional chess player.

In the 1868–69 season he won the British championship by beating the current holder, Cecil Valentine De Vere, and he was therefore regarded as England's best player. His first major international success was in a strong tournament at Baden-Baden in 1870, where he shared third place with Gustav Neumann, behind Adolf Anderssen and Wilhelm Steinitz but ahead of Paulsen, De Vere, Simon Winawer, Samuel Rosenthal and Johannes von Minckwitz.

Blackburne was regularly one of the world's top five players from 1871 to 1889, although Steinitz, Emanuel Lasker and, during his brief prime, Johannes Zukertort were clearly better players; and he remained in the top 20 until 1902, when he was 61 years old. His best results were in international tournaments. Although tournaments were much less frequent then than they are now, Blackburne played in nearly one strong tournament per year from 1870 to 1899; in particular he competed regularly in the German Chess Championship, which was an open tournament. In the 1870s and 1880s he was almost always a high prize-winner. His best results were 1st equal with Steinitz at Vienna 1873, where the commentators nicknamed Blackburne "the Black Death" (Steinitz won the play-off); 1st in London 1876 with a score of 10/11, ahead of Zukertort; and 1st in Berlin 1881, 3 points ahead of Zukertort. He also achieved 2nd place in: a strong mini-tournament in London 1872 (behind Steinitz but ahead of Zukertort), George Alcock MacDonnell and De Vere; shared 2nd place at Hamburg 1885 (with Siegbert Tarrasch, James Mason, Berthold Englisch and Max Weiss; behind Isidor Gunsberg; ahead of George Henry Mackenzie and five others); shared 2nd place at Frankfurt 1887 (with Weiss; behind Mackenzie; ahead of Curt von Bardeleben, Tarrasch and several others). His worst result from this 20-year period was 6th place in the very strong Vienna 1882 chess tournament, the one occasion on which all his major rivals placed ahead of him.

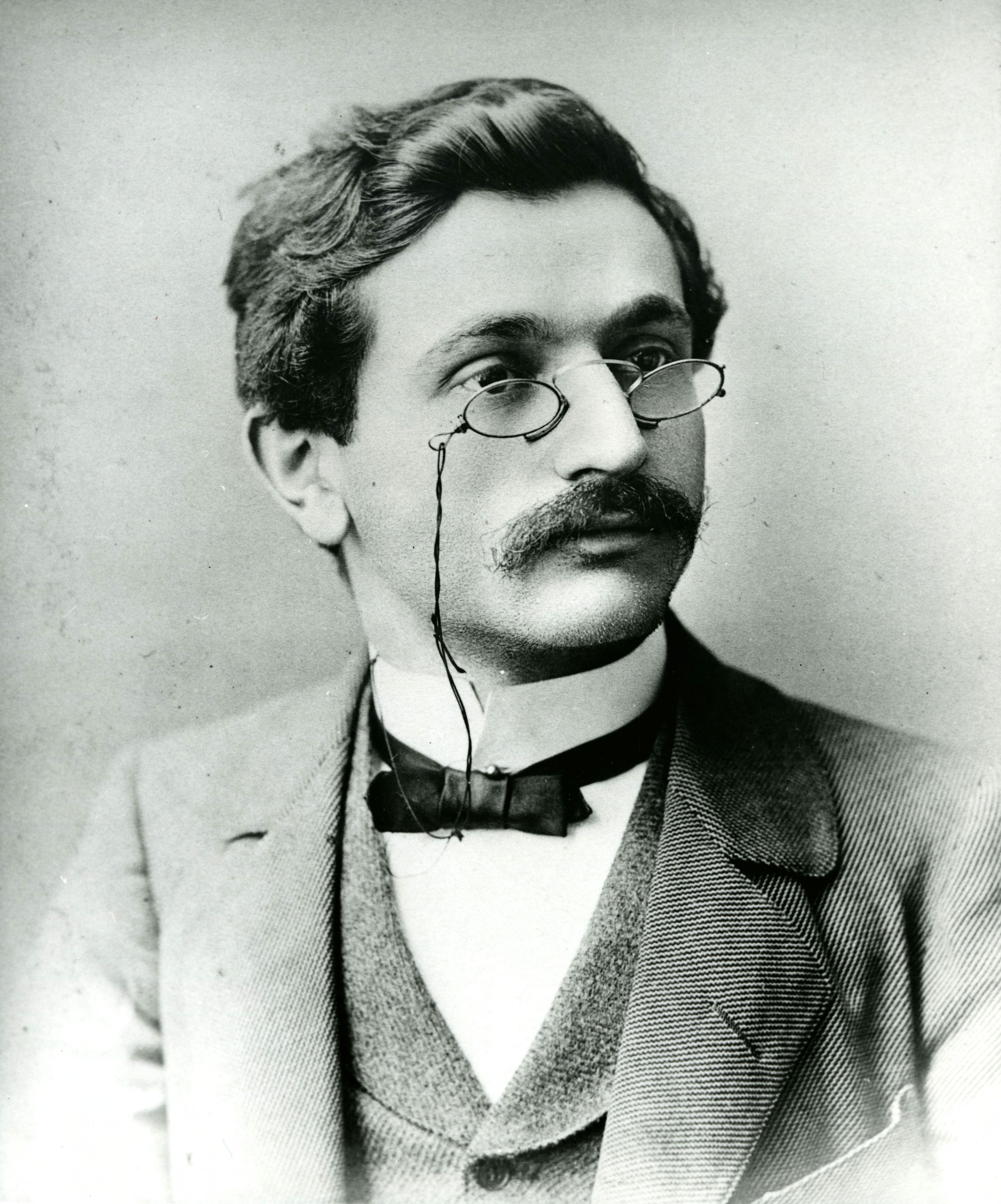
Emanuel Lasker, Steinitz's successor as World Chess Champion, dominated the second half of Blackburne's playing career

In the mid to late 1890s Blackburne was less successful in tournaments, but by this time he was competing against the next generation of players, Emanuel Lasker and Lasker's major rivals. Blackburne's worst results were 10th place at Hastings 1895 and 11th at Nuremberg 1896; but both of these tournaments included Lasker and most of the other top players of the new generation; and in both of these he finished ahead of several of the new stars and ahead of the few competing players of his own generation.

Chessmetrics concludes that Blackburne's best performances, taking account of the strength of his opponents, were his second places at Frankfurt 1887 (behind Mackenzie) and London 1892 (behind Emanuel Lasker). At London 1892 he finished only ½ point behind Emanuel Lasker and 2 points ahead of the third-placed player, Mason. Emanuel Lasker thought that Blackburne had more talent than Steinitz, but lacked the willpower and capacity for hard work needed for becoming world champion.

Blackburne's match results are weaker. He was twice soundly beat by Steinitz, in 1862/3 (+1−7=2) and 1876 (+0−7=0); but in 1862 Blackburne had been playing chess for barely 3 years, and in 1876 Steinitz was playing at his life-time best and in the middle of a 24-game winning streak. Emanuel Lasker beat Blackburne in 1892, but Lasker also beat Steinitz very decisively in their 1894 championship match. Blackburne was also comfortably beaten in 1881 by Zukertort (+2−7=5), who was in great form at the time; and Zukertort's health and play were declining rapidly when Blackburne beat him in 1887 (+5−1=7). On the other hand, against Gunsberg, Blackburne won his 1881 match (+7−4=3) and lost his 1887 match (+2−5=6); the 1887 match was Gunsberg's strongest performance, and Gunsberg only narrowly lost a world title match against Steinitz in 1890 (+6−4=9).

The 1876 match against Steinitz was held at the West-end Chess Club in London. The stakes were £60 a side with the winner taking all. This was a considerable sum of money in Victorian times – £60 in 1876 would be roughly equivalent to £29,000 in 2006's money. This was the first time that spectators were charged an entrance fee (half a guinea, = 52.5p in decimal terms) to see a chess match.

=== Exhibitions and other games ===
Position: a8 black rook, c8 black bishop, d8 black queen, e8 black king, f8 black bishop, g8 black knight, h8 black rook, a7 black pawn, b7 black pawn, c7 black pawn, d7 black pawn, f7 black pawn, g7 black pawn, h7 black pawn, e5 black pawn, c4 white bishop, d4 black knight, e4 white pawn, f3 white knight, a2 white pawn, b2 white pawn, c2 white pawn, d2 white pawn, f2 white pawn, g2 white pawn, h2 white pawn, a1 white rook, b1 white knight, c1 white bishop, d1 white queen, e1 white king, h1 white rook

The Blackburne Shilling Gambit after 1.e4 e5 2.Nf3 Nc6 3.Bc4 Nd4
After the natural 4.Nxe5!?, Black wins material with 4...Qg5! Now the obvious 5.Nxf7?? loses to 5...Qxg2 6.Rf1 Qxe4+ 7.Be2 Nf3#, a smothered mate.

After losing his job and discovering that he had a special aptitude for blindfold chess, Blackburne began giving blindfold and simultaneous exhibitions all over Britain, and for most of his career made most of his income from these exhibitions, including blindfold displays against up to twelve opponents simultaneously. He even travelled to Australia in 1885 to give exhibitions; on his arrival in Melbourne he was fined five pounds for assaulting a fellow passenger on the ship.

The Teesside Chess Association (formed in 1883; now called the Cleveland Chess Association) invited world-class players to give exhibitions, in order to raise money for the Association. Blackburne's fee for two simultaneous displays and a blindfold event in 1889 was 9 guineas (about £4,600 at 2006 values). Players paid the club a shilling for a simultaneous game or a half-crown to play him blindfold. In the simultaneous games he won 29, drew two and lost only one; in the blindfold he won seven and drew one with no losses.

In addition he played (mostly on top board) for the British team in 11 of the Anglo-American cable matches which commenced in 1896 and in the first six matches he recorded a score of 3½–2½ against the top American, Harry Pillsbury.

It is estimated that Blackburne played 100,000 games in his career, more than any other professional chess-player. However, he still had time to marry three times and with his second wife, Beatrice Lapham, he had a son, Julius, and with his third wife Mary Goodway (née Fox) another son, Frederick.

The dubious chess opening the Blackburne Shilling Gambit (1.e4 e5 2.Nf3 Nc6 3.Bc4 Nd4?!) has been named for Blackburne because he purportedly used it to win quickly against amateurs, thus winning the shilling wagered on the game. The opening is mentioned by Steinitz in his book The Modern Chess Instructor (1889).

=== Writings ===
In 1899 he published Mr. Blackburne's Games at Chess, edited by P. Anderson Graham.

Blackburne wrote two articles on chess for The Strand Magazine, in December 1906 and December 1907, and annotated numerous games for chess magazines, but he was never a chess correspondent for any publication.

=== Final years ===
In 1914, at the age of 72, Blackburne won a Special Brilliancy Prize for his win over Aron Nimzowitsch at the great St. Petersburg 1914 tournament, but failed to qualify for the final stage. That same year he tied for first place in the British championship with Frederick Yates, but ill health prevented him from contesting the play-off for the title. This was Blackburne's last major tournament. However, in 1921 Blackburne was still giving simultaneous exhibitions.

In 1922 his wife died. Blackburne died of a heart attack on 1 September 1924 at the age of 82. He is buried in the Brockley and Ladywell Cemeteries in Lewisham.

== Legacy ==
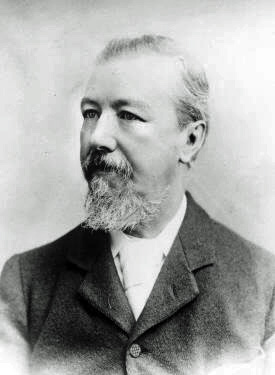
Blackburne circa 1890

Blackburne is an icon of Romantic chess because of his wide-open and highly tactical style of play. His large black beard and aggressive style earned him the nickname of "der Schwarze Tod" ("the Black Death", based on the plague of the same name) after his performance in the 1873 Vienna tournament. According to Chessmetrics, he was ranked second in the world at various times between 1873 and 1889. He was especially strong at endgames and had a great combinative ability which enabled him to win many brilliancy prizes. He was also widely known for his popular simultaneous and blindfold displays.

Mr. Blackburne's Games at Chess, which he published in 1899, has been recently reprinted by Moravian Chess. It contains over 400 of his games, around 20 problems composed by him, and a short biography.

A new book about him was published by McFarland in August 2015. It contains over a thousand of his games and more than 50 problems with a detailed account of his life, family, and career.

== Notable games ==
- Joseph Henry Blackburne vs. Jacques Schwarz, DSB Kongress, Berlin 1881 Wilhelm Steinitz, who was no friend of Blackburne, wrote, "White's design ...belongs to the finest efforts of chess genius ..."
- Joseph Henry Blackburne vs. Samuel Lipschutz, New York 1889 A series of sacrifices demolishes the Black defenses.
- Emanuel Lasker vs. Joseph Henry Blackburne, London (England) 1899 Blackburne, 58 years old and playing with the black pieces, beat the reigning world champion.

== Tournament results ==
Date	Location	Place	Notes
1862	London International Tournament	9=	Adolf Anderssen won; Blackburne shared last place.
1867	Dundee International Tournament	5	Behind Gustav Neumann, Wilhelm Steinitz, George Alcock MacDonnell and Cecil Valentine De Vere
1869	2nd British Chess Championship	1	Beat De Vere in a play-off following tie. (Tournament began in late 1868.)
1870	Baden-Baden	3=	Tied with Neumann; behind Adolf Anderssen and Steinitz; but ahead of Louis Paulsen, De Vere, Szymon Winawer, Samuel Rosenthal and Johannes von Minckwitz
1872	London	2	Behind Steinitz; ahead of Zukertort, MacDonnell and De Vere
1873	Vienna	1=	Tied with Steinitz, who won both games of the playoff match This is where Blackburne was nicknamed "the Black Death".
1876	London	1	Ahead of Johannes Zukertort; Blackburne scored 10/11; this was just a month after Steinitz had whitewashed Blackburne 7–0 in a match.
1878	Paris	3	Behind Winawer and Zukertort
1880	Berlin	1=	Tied with Berthold Englisch and Adolf Schwarz
1881	Berlin	1	3 points ahead of Zukertort (2nd)
1882	Vienna	6	Behind Steinitz, Winawer, James Mason, Zukertort and George Henry Mackenzie
1883	London	3	Behind Zukertort and Steinitz; ahead of Mikhail Chigorin, Englisch, Mackenzie, Mason, Rosenthal, Winawer and Henry Edward Bird
1885	Hamburg	2=	With Siegbert Tarrasch, Mason, Englisch and Max Weiss; behind Isidor Gunsberg; ahead of Mackenzie and 5 others.
1887	Frankfurt	2=	With Weiss; behind Mackenzie; ahead of Curt von Bardeleben, Tarrasch and several others; Zukertort could only finish 14=.
1889	Breslau	8=	With Mason; behind Tarrasch, Amos Burn, Jacques Mieses, von Bardeleben, Johann Bauer, Gunsberg, and Louis Paulsen. Ahead of Johann Berger, Emil Schallopp, Johannes Metger, Alexander Fritz, von Minckwitz, Semyon Alapin, Max Harmonist, Emanuel Schiffers and George H. D. Gossip.
1889	New York City	4	Behind Chigorin, Weiss and Gunsberg; ahead of Burn and 15 others. This tournament was extremely strong, as it was designed to select a challenger for Steinitz' title.
1890	Manchester	2	Behind Tarrasch; ahead of Mackenzie, Bird and Mason
1892	Belfast International Tournament	1=	equal first with Mason
1894	Leipzig	4	Behind Tarrasch, Paul Lipke and Richard Teichmann; ahead of Carl August Walbrodt, Dawid Janowski, Georg Marco, Mieses and Carl Schlechter
1895	Hastings	10	Behind Harry Nelson Pillsbury, Chigorin, Emanuel Lasker, Tarrasch, Steinitz, Emanuel Schiffers, von Bardeleben, Teichmann and Schlechter; ahead of Walbrodt, Burn, Janowski, Mason, Bird, Gunsberg, Adolf Albin, Marco, William Pollock, Mieses, Samuel Tinsley and Beniamino Vergani.
1896	Nuremberg	11	Behind Em. Lasker, Géza Maróczy, Pillsbury, Tarrasch, Janowski, Steinitz, Walbrodt, Schiffers and Chigorin; ahead of Rudolf Charousek, Marco, Albin, Winawer, Jackson Showalter, Moritz Porges, Schallopp and Teichmann.
1897	Berlin	3	Behind Charousek and Walbrodt; ahead of Janowski, Burn, Alapin, Marco, Schlechter, Caro, Chigorin, Schiffers, Metger, Winawer, Wilhelm Cohn, Hugo Suechting, Teichmann, Englisch, Adolf Zinkl, Albin and von Bardeleben.
1898	Vienna	11	Behind Tarrasch, Pillsbury, Janowski, Steinitz, Schlechter, Chigorin, Burn, Lipke, Maroczy and Simon Alapin; ahead of Schiffers, Marco, Showalter, Walbrodt, Halprin, Horatio Caro, David Graham Baird and Trenchard.
1899	London	6	Behind Em. Lasker, Janowski, Maroczy, Pillsbury and Schlechter; ahead of Chigorin, Showalter, Mason, W. Cohn, Steinitz, Lee, Bird, Tinsley and Teichmann (who withdrew after 4 games due to illness). Blackburne, as Black, beat Lasker; this was the first time a British player had defeated a reigning world champion.
1904	Hastings (British Championship)	3	
1907	(British Championship)	2=	
1910	(British Championship)	2=	
1913	(British Championship)	3	
1914	St. Petersburg	---	Blackburne did not qualify for the 5-player final stage, in which the placings were: 1 Em. Lasker; 2 José Raúl Capablanca; 3 Alexander Alekhine; 4 Tarrasch; 5 Frank Marshall. At 3.5/10, Blackburne had the 4th-5th best score of the 6 players who did not qualify for the finals – behind Ossip Bernstein, Akiba Rubinstein, and Aron Nimzowitsch; tied with Janowski; and ahead of Gunsberg. Won a Special Brilliancy Prize for his win over Nimzowitsch.
1914	(British Championship)	1=	Tied with Frederick Yates; this was Blackburne's last international tournament; he was 72.

== Match results ==
Here are Blackburne's results in matches:

- Under score, + games won, = games drawn, − games lost

Date	Opponent	Result	Location	Score		Notes
1862-63	Wilhelm Steinitz	Lost	London	2/10	+1−7=2	Only two years after Blackburne started playing chess.
1876	Wilhelm Steinitz	Lost	London	0/7	+0−7=0	
1881	Johannes Zukertort	Lost	London	4½/14	+2−7=5	
1881	Isidor Gunsberg	Won	London	8½/14	+7−4=3	
1887	Zukertort	Won	London	9½/5½	+5−1=7	Zukertort's health and play declined rapidly after he lost the 1886 World Championship match to Steinitz.
1887	Gunsberg	Lost	Bradford	½/5	+0−4=1	In 1890 Gunsberg gave Steinitz a good fight in a world title match (Steinitz won by +6−4=9).
1891	Celso Golmayo Zúpide	Won	Havana	6/10	+5−3=2	
1891	Vasquez	Won	Havana	5½/6	+5−0=1	
1892	Emanuel Lasker	Lost	??	2/10	+0−6=4	
1895	Curt von Bardeleben	Drew	London	4½/9	+3−3=3	
