= Berthold Englisch =

Austrian chess player (1851–1897)

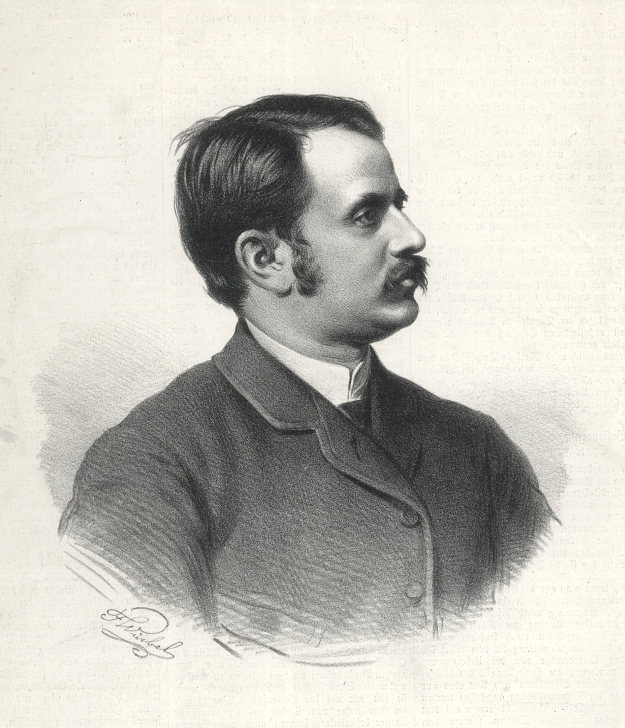

Berthold Englisch (9 July 1851 in Hotzenplotz – 19 October 1897 in Vienna) was a chess master from Austria-Hungary.

Englisch was born in Austrian Silesia, Austrian Empire into a Jewish family. He earned his living as a stock-market agent.

He won the tournaments at Leipzig 1879 (the 1st DSB Congress), at Wiesbaden 1880 (ex-equo with Blackburne and A. Schwarz, ahead of Schallopp, Mason, Bird, Winawer, etc.) and at Vienna 1896 (Quadrangular).

He lost two matches against Vincenz Hruby in 1882 and to Emanuel Lasker in 1890, both scoring 1.5 : 3.5, and drew a match with Harry Nelson Pillsbury 2.5 : 2.5 (+0 –0 =5) in 1896, all in Vienna.

== See also ==
- List of Jewish chess players
