= Curt von Bardeleben =

German chess master, journalist and aristocrat (1861–1924)

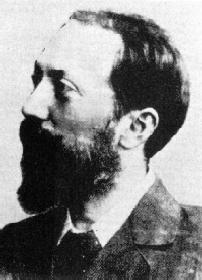

Personal information
- Born: 4 March 1861 Berlin, Kingdom of Prussia
- Died: 31 January 1924 (aged 62) Berlin, Prussia, Germany

Chess career
- Country: Germany

Curt Carl Alfred von Bardeleben (4 March 1861 – 31 January 1924) was a German chess master, journalist, and member of the German nobility.

== Biography ==
Curt von Bardeleben started playing chess when he was ten years old and quickly developed into one of the strongest players in Weimar. Originally a student of law, Bardeleben gave it up in order to become a professional chess player. He later quit competitive chess for four years between 1883 and 1887 to complete his law studies. He recorded some fine tournament results, especially in the 1880s and 1890s. Although his later chess career was spotty, he continued to be a strong player. In 1908 he lost a match to future world champion Alexander Alekhine, who described him as "a charming old chap" but also said he lacked the will to win. Bardeleben was married three times in the early 1900s, supposedly to women who wanted his title of nobility. He was described thus by Edward Lasker:

He always wore a black cut-away suit of dubious vintage. Apparently he could never spare enough money to buy a new suit, although I learned one day that at fairly regular intervals he received comparatively large sums – from one to several thousand marks – through the simple expedient of marrying, and shortly after, divorcing, some lady who craved the distinction of his noble name and was willing to pay for it. Unfortunately, when he received his reward, it was usually far exceeded by the amount of the debts he had accumulated since his last divorce. Evil tongues had it that the number of the ladies involved in these brief marital interludes had grown so alarmingly that they could easily have made up a Sultan's harem.

Bardeleben tied for first place with Fritz Riemann at Leipzig 1888, tied for first place with Carl August Walbrodt at Kiel 1893, was first at Berlin (SV Centrum) 1897, and tied for first place with Carl Schlechter and Rudolf Swiderski at Coburg 1904. He edited the magazine Deutsche Schachzeitung from 1887 through 1891. Bardeleben seemingly committed suicide by jumping out of a window in 1924. According to one obituary, however, he fell out by accident. His life and death have been cited as an inspiration for the main character in the novel The Defense by Vladimir Nabokov, which was made into the movie The Luzhin Defence.

== Game vs. Steinitz ==
Bardeleben is perhaps best known for the game he lost to the former world champion Wilhelm Steinitz at Hastings 1895, especially because he simply walked out of the tournament room instead of resigning. Although he was sharing the second place in the tournament before this game (7.5 in 9 rounds, Mikhail Chigorin had the lead with 8), he achieved only 4 points in the final 12 rounds. The game against Steinitz:

1. e4 e5 2. Nf3 Nc6 3. Bc4 Bc5 4. c3 Nf6 5. d4 exd4 6. cxd4 Bb4+ 7. Nc3 d5 8. exd5 Nxd5 9. O-O Be6 10. Bg5 Be7 11. Bxd5 Bxd5 12. Nxd5 Qxd5 13. Bxe7 Nxe7 14. Re1 f6 15. Qe2 Qd7 16. Rac1 c6 17. d5 cxd5 18. Nd4 Kf7 19. Ne6 Rhc8 20. Qg4 g6 21. Ng5+ Ke8 22. Rxe7+ Kf8 23. Rf7+ Kg8 24. Rg7+ 1-0
