= Berlin Defence =

Position: a8 black rook, c8 black bishop, d8 black queen, e8 black king, f8 black bishop, h8 black rook, a7 black pawn, b7 black pawn, c7 black pawn, d7 black pawn, f7 black pawn, g7 black pawn, h7 black pawn, c6 black knight, f6 black knight, b5 white bishop, e5 black pawn, e4 white pawn, f3 white knight, a2 white pawn, b2 white pawn, c2 white pawn, d2 white pawn, f2 white pawn, g2 white pawn, h2 white pawn, a1 white rook, b1 white knight, c1 white bishop, d1 white queen, e1 white king, h1 white rook
- Moves: 1.e4 e5 2.Nf3 Nc6 3.Bb5 Nf6
- ECO: C65–C67
- Parent: Ruy Lopez

The Berlin Defence is a chess opening that begins with the moves:

1. e4 e5
2. Nf3 Nc6
3. Bb5 Nf6

The Berlin is the second most popular reply (after 3...a6) to the Ruy Lopez for Black. Though it has a long history, it became particularly popular in the 21st century after Vladimir Kramnik successfully used it as a drawing weapon against Garry Kasparov in the Classical World Chess Championship 2000. The most common continuation is 4.0-0 Nxe4, the Open Berlin, which may be followed by 5.d4 or 5.Re1. The main alternative is 4.d3, the Anti-Berlin, where White gives up the possibility of playing d2-d4 in one move in order to prevent ...Nxe4.

Frequently in the Berlin Defence, the players exchange queens early, entering an endgame. The resulting endgames are generally viewed as equal or very slightly favourable for White; however, both sides can opt to avoid exchanging queens. Strategically, the Berlin Defence is often used as a drawing weapon by players who want to obtain a draw as Black, and by players who prefer to play defensively and reach endgames.

In the Encyclopaedia of Chess Openings, the opening is assigned codes C65–C67. The code C66 covers 4.0-0 d6. The code C67 covers 4.0-0 Nxe4. The code C65 covers all other continuations except 4.Nc3, which transposes to the Four Knights Game.

== History ==
The Berlin Defence was first analysed in depth in the 19th century, and received its name from the Berliners that examined its variations. It was played eight times by Johannes Zukertort against Wilhelm Steinitz in the World Chess Championship 1886, the first official World Chess Championship. It also was played three times by Mikhail Chigorin in the World Chess Championship 1892, also against Steinitz. Steinitz won six of the eleven Berlin games in these championships, using the 4.0-0 Nxe4 5.Re1 and 4.d3 lines. Emanuel Lasker was also a frequent practitioner of the Berlin Defence, making extensive use of it during his career.

Due to a perception of passivity, the opening declined in popularity. After the early 20th century, it was rarely used in high-level games and received little attention until the Classical World Chess Championship 2000, in which challenger Vladimir Kramnik used it as a drawing weapon against champion Garry Kasparov. Kramnik used the Berlin in games 1, 3, 9 and 13 in the match (each time as Black), all four of which were drawn. After losing the match, Kasparov cited Kramnik's superior opening preparation as a reason for his loss. In an interview with John Henderson, Kramnik described his use of the Berlin:

The Berlin Defence suited my strategy for the match. I had a defensive strategy – Actually, I had in my pocket some other sharper stuff to fall back on – but first I wanted to try the defensive strategy with Black and it worked so well. This was all new to Kasparov – he probably expected me to fight for equality with Black.

The 2000 match caused a resurgence of interest in the Berlin Defence at all levels of the game, such as its use by Magnus Carlsen and Viswanathan Anand in games 4, 6, 7 and 8 of the World Chess Championship 2013. It is now regarded as a solid opening for Black to use in order to achieve an equal endgame.

== Open Berlin: 4.0-0 Nxe4 ==
Position: a8 black rook, c8 black bishop, d8 black queen, e8 black king, f8 black bishop, h8 black rook, a7 black pawn, b7 black pawn, c7 black pawn, d7 black pawn, f7 black pawn, g7 black pawn, h7 black pawn, c6 black knight, b5 white bishop, e5 black pawn, e4 black knight, f3 white knight, a2 white pawn, b2 white pawn, c2 white pawn, d2 white pawn, f2 white pawn, g2 white pawn, h2 white pawn, a1 white rook, b1 white knight, c1 white bishop, d1 white queen, f1 white rook, g1 white king

Open Berlin: 4.0-0 Nxe4

White may safely castle with 4.0-0 as Black's third move does not truly threaten to win White's pawn on e4, as if Black captures it, White will always be able to win back the pawn on e5. Regardless, Black usually responds with 4...Nxe4, opening the game and leading to tactical complications.

After 4...Nxe4, the Open Berlin, White's most common move is 5.d4. 5...exd4 would result in Black's knight being pinned to the king after 6.Re1. The usual reply is instead 5...Nd6, retreating the knight to safety and counterattacking White's bishop. The main line continues 6.Bxc6 dxc6 7.dxe5 Nf5 8.Qxd8+ Kxd8, leading to an endgame where Black has lost castling rights. 8.Qe2 is possible but well met by 8...Nd4, as 9.Nxd4 Qxd4 10.Rd1 can be met with 10...Bg4.

There are a variety of sidelines available for both sides. The most common is 5.Re1, which is also very drawish despite avoiding the endgame.

=== Berlin Endgame: 5.d4 Nd6 6.Bxc6 dxc6 7.dxe5 Nf5 8.Qxd8+ Kxd8 ===
Position: a8 black rook, c8 black bishop, d8 black king, f8 black bishop, h8 black rook, a7 black pawn, b7 black pawn, c7 black pawn, f7 black pawn, g7 black pawn, h7 black pawn, c6 black pawn, e5 white pawn, f5 black knight, f3 white knight, a2 white pawn, b2 white pawn, c2 white pawn, f2 white pawn, g2 white pawn, h2 white pawn, a1 white rook, b1 white knight, c1 white bishop, f1 white rook, g1 white king

Main line after 8...Kxd8: Berlin Endgame

The Berlin Endgame is reached after 4.0-0 Nxe4 5.d4 Nd6 6.Bxc6 dxc6 7.dxe5 Nf5 8.Qxd8+ Kxd8. It has also been called the Berlin Wall. In this line, the queens are exchanged off the board early, leading to a position that is difficult for White to win, though the position was once regarded as giving a slight advantage for White. Black has the disadvantage of doubled pawns and a king misplaced in the centre, and White has a pawn majority on the kingside, but has given up the bishop pair in exchange. It is difficult for White to exploit the structural superiority without opening the game for Black's bishops. Despite the line's drawish tendency, it is considered to be the sternest test (perhaps along with 5.Re1) of the entire Berlin Defence and is extensively analysed. The modern consensus is that Black can hold the endgame with accurate play.

The endgame was famously played in all four Berlin games of the Classical World Chess Championship 2000 between Vladimir Kramnik and Garry Kasparov. Kramnik assessed the endgame as better for White, but argued that Black should be able to draw as White's advantage is insufficient to win, and was able to secure a draw in each of the four games against the then reigning world champion. After this, the Berlin rose greatly in popularity.

Common ninth moves for White are 9.Nc3, 9.h3 and 9.Rd1+. A number of plans are possible for Black. After 9.Nc3, the most common move, 9...Ke8 and 9...h6 are common, as well as the more recent 9...Bd7 (intending a later ...Kc8) and the unnatural 9...Ne7, as well as 9...Be7. 9...Be6 is possible but invites 10.Ng5. White plans to advance on the kingside with f4 and g4, with the goal of eventually promoting a pawn.

=== L'hermet Variation: 6.dxe5 ===
Position: a8 black rook, c8 black bishop, e8 black king, f8 black bishop, h8 black rook, a7 black pawn, b7 black pawn, c7 black pawn, f7 black pawn, g7 black pawn, h7 black pawn, d6 black queen, a4 white pawn, d4 white queen, b2 white pawn, c2 white pawn, f2 white pawn, g2 white pawn, h2 white pawn, a1 white rook, b1 white knight, c1 white bishop, f1 white rook, g1 white king

Position after 14...Qd6. The game ends here as a draw due to threefold repetition.

6.dxe5, which has been called the L'hermet Variation, (Note: The spelling "L'Hermet" is also used, but German-language sources strongly prefer "L'hermet".) is also colloquially known as the Berlin Draw, as it has frequently been used by top-level players to agree to an early draw. This draw occurs after 6...Nxb5 7.a4 Nbd4 8.Nxd4 Nxd4 9.Qxd4 d5 10.exd6 e.p. Qxd6 11.Qe4+ Qe6 12.Qd4 Qd6 13.Qe4+ Qe6 14.Qd4 Qd6, where the game ends after a threefold repetition draw claim on move 14, or soon after.

The line is not a forced draw, as either side can deviate, although White is analysed as having no advantage after 6.dxe5 and it is generally considered that there are better ways to play for advantage in the Berlin. This line was featured in the game Erigaisi–Gukesh, Wijk aan Zee, 2023. Ian Nepomniachtchi played this line against Nakamura in Round 12 of the Candidates Tournament 2022, forcing a quick draw by repetition. With two rounds remaining in the tournament, the draw extended Nepomniachtchi's lead in the tournament while Nakamura found the result acceptable to keep his second place position. Thus, both players benefited from the draw in light of the incumbent World Champion Magnus Carlsen's suggestion that he would not play another World Championship match, leaving the match to the first and second place finishers of the Candidates. During the World Blitz Chess Championship 2022, a match between Richárd Rapport and Nakamura with Black ended in a Berlin Draw that took just 36 seconds from first move to the threefold repetition. It would have taken just 20 seconds if not for Rapport spending 16 seconds deciding whether to enter the drawing line.

=== White's sixth-move alternatives ===
Position: a8 black rook, c8 black bishop, d8 black queen, f8 black rook, g8 black king, a7 black pawn, b7 black pawn, c7 black pawn, d7 black pawn, e7 black bishop, f7 black pawn, g7 black pawn, h7 black pawn, c6 black knight, d6 black knight, e5 white knight, a4 white bishop, d4 white pawn, e4 black pawn, c3 white knight, a2 white pawn, b2 white pawn, c2 white pawn, f2 white pawn, g2 white pawn, h2 white pawn, a1 white rook, c1 white bishop, d1 white queen, e1 white rook, g1 white king

5.d4 Nd6 6.Ba4 e4 7.Re1 Be7 8.Ne5 0-0 9.Nc3
- 6.Ba4 has been called the Showalter Variation. Common continuations include 6...e4 and then 7.Re1 Be7 8.Ne5 0-0 9.Nc3 or 7.Ne5 Be7 8.Nc3 0-0 9.Re1, which both lead to the same position, or 6...exd4, where a common line is 7.c3 Be7 8.cxd4 and then 8...b5 or 8...0-0.
- 6.Bg5 is a rarely seen zwischenzug. The most common line is 6...Be7 7.Bxe7 Qxe7 8.Bxc6 dxc6 9.dxe5 Nf5. 7...Nxe7 and 6...f6 are two alternatives for Black.

=== Black's fifth-move alternatives ===
Position: a8 black rook, c8 black bishop, d8 black queen, e8 black king, h8 black rook, a7 black pawn, b7 black knight, c7 black pawn, d7 black pawn, e7 black bishop, f7 black pawn, g7 black pawn, h7 black pawn, c6 black pawn, e5 white pawn, f3 white knight, a2 white pawn, b2 white pawn, c2 white pawn, e2 white queen, f2 white pawn, g2 white pawn, h2 white pawn, a1 white rook, b1 white knight, c1 white bishop, f1 white rook, g1 white king

5.d4 Be7 6.Qe2 Nd6 7.Bxc6 bxc6 8.dxe5 Nb7
- 5...Be7 is Black's main alternative to 5...Nd6, and has been called the Rio de Janeiro Variation. It was once common (being played several times by Emanuel Lasker, for example, including three games in the World Chess Championship 1908), as it avoids the endgame that occurs after 5...Nd6, though it declined in popularity after Black's compensation was demonstrated in that line. It typically continues 6.Qe2 Nd6 7.Bxc6 bxc6 8.dxe5, followed by 8...Nb7 or 8...Nf5. Other common lines include 6.dxe5 0-0, the Minckwitz Variation; 6.Re1 Nd6 7.dxe5 Nf5 8.Bxc6 dxc6 (or 7.Bxc6 dxc6 8.dxe5 Nf5) 9.Qxd8+ Bxd8; and 6.d5 Nd6.
- 5...a6 is another alternative for Black. Johannes Zukertort analysed it in an article published in 1883. The most common move is 6.Ba4, which transposes to the main line of the Open Spanish, more often reached via 3...a6 4.Ba4 Nf6 5.0-0 Nxe4 6.d4. Instead of transposing, 6.Bxc6 dxc6 is possible, which may be followed by 7.Re1 Nf6 or 7.Qe2 Bf5.

=== 5.Re1 ===
Position: a8 black rook, c8 black bishop, d8 black queen, e8 black rook, g8 black king, a7 black pawn, b7 black pawn, c7 black pawn, d7 black pawn, f7 black pawn, g7 black pawn, h7 black pawn, d6 black knight, f6 black bishop, d4 white pawn, a2 white pawn, b2 white pawn, c2 white pawn, f2 white pawn, g2 white pawn, h2 white pawn, a1 white rook, b1 white knight, c1 white bishop, d1 white queen, e1 white rook, f1 white bishop, g1 white king

5.Re1 Nd6 6.Nxe5 Be7 7.Bf1 Nxe5 8.Rxe5 0-0 9.d4 Bf6 10.Re1 Re8

5.Re1 has a reputation as a very low-risk line for White, and it has been advocated by Alexei Shirov. It has also been played by Magnus Carlsen. The line has grown in popularity over time as it avoids the drawish endgame after 5.d4 Nd6, though 5.Re1 is itself also very drawish.

The most common continuation is 5...Nd6 6.Nxe5 Be7 7.Bf1 Nxe5 8.Rxe5 0-0 9.d4 Bf6 10.Re1 Re8, leading to a position with a symmetrical pawn structure where all of White's pieces are still on the first rank. The line occurred in the fourth game of the World Chess Championship 1886. It never occurred again in a World Chess Championship until the 21st century.

After 10.Re1 Re8, the most common line is 11.c3 Rxe1 12.Qxe1 Ne8 13.Bf4 d5. Also possible is 11.Bf4 Rxe1 12.Qxe1 Bxd4 13.Bxd6 cxd6, where White sacrifices a pawn, though Black may transpose to the first line after 12...Ne8 13.c3 d5.

Common deviations from the main line include 9...Ne8, 9.Nc3, 7...Nf5, 7.Bd3, 6.a4 and 6.Ba4.

== Black's fourth-move alternatives ==
=== 4...Bc5 ===
Position: a8 black rook, c8 black bishop, d8 black queen, e8 black king, h8 black rook, a7 black pawn, b7 black pawn, c7 black pawn, d7 black pawn, f7 black pawn, g7 black pawn, h7 black pawn, c6 black knight, f6 black knight, b5 white bishop, c5 black bishop, e5 black pawn, e4 white pawn, c3 white pawn, f3 white knight, a2 white pawn, b2 white pawn, d2 white pawn, f2 white pawn, g2 white pawn, h2 white pawn, a1 white rook, b1 white knight, c1 white bishop, d1 white queen, f1 white rook, g1 white king

Zukertort Gambit: 4.0-0 Bc5 5.c3

4...Bc5 has been called the Beverwijk Variation. It is also frequently reached from the Cordel Defence (3...Bc5) after 4.0-0 Nf6. White may respond with 5.c3, 5.Nxe5 or 5.d3, which transposes to the main line of the Anti-Berlin.

5.c3 was played by Johannes Zukertort in the 1860s and has been called the Zukertort Gambit. Black can accept the pawn with 5...Nxe4, where Zukertort's line continues 6.Qe2 Bxf2+ 7.Rxf2 Nxf2; 7.Kh1, 6...d5 and 6.d4 are common deviations. The main continuation to 5.c3, however, is 5...0-0 6.d4 Bb6, typically followed by 7.Bg5 h6 (or 7...d6) 8.Bh4 d6, 7.Re1 or 7.dxe5.

5.Nxe5 tends to continue with either 5...Nxe4 6.Qe2 Nxe5 7.Qxe4 Qe7 or 5...Nxe5 6.d4 (a forking pattern also seen in other openings) a6.

=== 4...d6 ===
Position: a8 black rook, c8 black bishop, d8 black queen, e8 black king, f8 black bishop, h8 black rook, a7 black pawn, b7 black pawn, c7 black pawn, f7 black pawn, g7 black pawn, h7 black pawn, c6 black knight, d6 black pawn, f6 black knight, b5 white bishop, e5 black pawn, d4 white pawn, e4 white pawn, f3 white knight, a2 white pawn, b2 white pawn, c2 white pawn, f2 white pawn, g2 white pawn, h2 white pawn, a1 white rook, b1 white knight, c1 white bishop, d1 white queen, f1 white rook, g1 white king

4.0-0 d6 5.d4

4...d6 simply reinforces the pawn on e5. It may end up transposing to lines of the Steinitz Defence (3...d6) while eliminating continuations of the Steinitz where White delays castling. It is regarded as playable but passive. Though it is rare today, 4...d6 was once a frequent alternative to 4...Nxe4; Emanuel Lasker played it twice in the World Chess Championship 1908. White typically responds with 5.d4 or 5.Re1.

5.d4 intends to open the centre and most often continues 5...Bd7 6.Nc3 Be7. The main alternative line is 5...exd4 6.Nxd4 Bd7, adding a defender to the doubly attacked knight on c6. White's most common move is 7.Nc3, leading to a position more often reached from the Four Knights Game.

After 5.Re1, Black usually plays ...Bd7, ...Be7 and ...0-0 in some order, a solid but relatively passive defensive setup.

=== Other lines ===
- 4...Be7 has the common continuation 5.Re1 d6, followed by 6.d4 or 6.c3.
- 4...Ng4 attempts a Fishing Pole trap; after 5.h3 h5, 6.hxg4?? is a blunder.

== Anti-Berlin: 4.d3 ==
Position: a8 black rook, c8 black bishop, d8 black queen, e8 black king, f8 black bishop, h8 black rook, a7 black pawn, b7 black pawn, c7 black pawn, d7 black pawn, f7 black pawn, g7 black pawn, h7 black pawn, c6 black knight, f6 black knight, b5 white bishop, e5 black pawn, e4 white pawn, d3 white pawn, f3 white knight, a2 white pawn, b2 white pawn, c2 white pawn, f2 white pawn, g2 white pawn, h2 white pawn, a1 white rook, b1 white knight, c1 white bishop, d1 white queen, e1 white king, h1 white rook

Anti-Berlin: 4.d3

4.d3 is by far the most common fourth-move alternative for White. Because many players with White do not want to enter the lines following 4.0-0 Nxe4 in order to avoid a draw, the move has grown in popularity to rival 4.0-0. It is often known as the Anti-Berlin. Preventing ...Nxe4 keeps the game closed and sidesteps the Berlin Endgame. Black typically responds 4...Bc5 or 4...d6.

=== Main line: 4...Bc5 5.c3 ===
After 4...Bc5, White most often responds with 5.c3, typically continuing 5...0-0 6.0-0 and then 6...d6, 6...Re8 or 6...d5. Black may also play 5...d6 or 5...d5.

After 5...0-0 6.0-0 d5, White's main moves are 7.Nbd2 and 7.exd5; 7.Qe2 and 7.Bxc6 are also possible. 7.exd5 is seen as leading to a pawn structure that is better for Black, with the main continuation 7...Qxd5 (7...Nxd5 permits 8.Bxc6 bxc6 9.Nxe5) 8.Bc4 Qd8 and then 9.Nbd2 or 9.b4.

=== 5.Bxc6 ===
5.Bxc6 is the most common alternative to 5.c3 for White and has gained popularity over time. Unlike in the standard Exchange Variation (3...a6 4.Bxc6) of the Ruy Lopez, Black has already played Nf6, which makes it more difficult to defend the pawn on e5.

After the usual 5...dxc6, White has several options, the most common of which are 6.Nbd2 and 6.0-0, followed by 6.h3 and 6.Qe2. Black often ends up playing ...Nd7 in these lines.

=== Other lines ===
- After 4...Bc5, 5.0-0 permits Black to play 5...Nd4, continuing 6.Nxd4 Bxd4 7.c3, or Black may play 5...d6, which usually ends up transposing to positions reached from 5.c3.
- 4...d6 is the main alternative to 4...Bc5. Black intends to place the bishop on e7 instead of c5. White's most common replies are 5.0-0 and 5.c3. 5.c4 is the aggressive but risky Duras Variation.
- 4...Ne7?! is the Mortimer Trap, which wins a piece if White plays 5.Nxe5, as after 5...c6, White must lose a piece. 6.Bc4 can be met with 6...Qa5+, and 6.Nc4 can be met with 6...d6! (not 6...cxb5?? 7.Nd6#) 7.Ba4 b5. However, 4...Ne7 is regarded as an inferior move because it loses time by moving the same piece twice. Simply 5.0-0 is good for White.

== White's fourth-move alternatives ==
- 4.Nc3 transposes to the Four Knights Game, Spanish Variation.
- 4.Qe2 defends both the bishop on b5 and the pawn on e4. It usually continues 4...Bc5, or alternatively 4...d6, 4...a6, 4...Bd6 or 4...Be7.
- 4.d4 usually continues 4...exd4 5.0-0, the Nyholm Attack, or 5.e5 Ne4 6.0-0.
- 4.Bxc6 is possible but inferior to 4.d3 and only then 5.Bxc6.
