= Ruy Lopez, Mortimer Trap =

Chess opening trap

Position: a8 black rook, c8 black bishop, d8 black queen, e8 black king, f8 black bishop, h8 black rook, a7 black pawn, b7 black pawn, d7 black pawn, e7 black knight, f7 black pawn, g7 black pawn, h7 black pawn, c6 black pawn, f6 black knight, b5 white bishop, e5 white knight, e4 white pawn, d3 white pawn, a2 white pawn, b2 white pawn, c2 white pawn, f2 white pawn, g2 white pawn, h2 white pawn, a1 white rook, b1 white knight, c1 white bishop, d1 white queen, e1 white king, h1 white rook

Position after 5...c6. Black wins a piece.

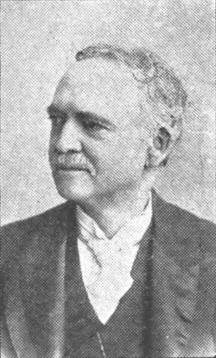

The Mortimer Trap is a chess opening trap in the Ruy Lopez named after James Mortimer. The Mortimer Trap is a true trap in the sense that Black deliberately plays an inferior move to tempt White into making a mistake.

== Analysis ==
1. e4 e5 2. Nf3 Nc6 3. Bb5 Nf6

The trap begins with Black playing the Berlin Defense to the Ruy Lopez. Although the Berlin was much more popular in the 19th century than in the 20th, it "became the height of theory when Vladimir Kramnik used it as his main defense to defeat Garry Kasparov in their 2000 World Championship match."

4. d3

White plays a quiet alternative to the more common 4.0-0, 4.d4, or 4.Nc3 (the last would transpose to the Four Knights Game). I. A. Horowitz and Fred Reinfeld wrote that 4.d3 is "Steinitz's move, with which he scored many spectacular successes during his long reign as World Champion."

4... Ne7?!

The Mortimer Defense, intending to reroute the knight to g6. This rare move loses time and thus is inferior to other moves, but it sets a trap. White has several acceptable replies, for example 5.Bc4 c6 6.Nc3 Ng6 7.h4! with the upper hand and an attack (Keres, Olafsson), but the tempting capture of the black pawn on e5 is a mistake.

5. Nxe5? c6! (see diagram)

Attacking the white bishop and threatening 6...Qa5+. If the bishop moves (6.Ba4 or 6.Bc4), Black wins a piece with 6...Qa5+, forking the white king and knight.

6. Nc4!?

Covering a5 and thus preventing 6...Qa5+, and threatening smothered mate with 7.Nd6#.

6... Ng6!

After 6...d6 7.Ba4, Black forks the white bishop and knight with 7...b5, winning a piece for two pawns. Likewise after 6...Ng6, Black will win material.

== Discussion ==
Mortimer played his defense at the 1883 London tournament against Berthold Englisch, Samuel Rosenthal, and Josef Noa, losing all three games. Johannes Zukertort, the tournament winner, also played it against Englisch, the game resulting in a draw. Zukertort wrote of 4...Ne7, "Mr. Mortimer claims to be the inventor of this move. I adopted it on account of its novelty." The first edition of the treatise Chess Openings, Ancient and Modern analyzed 5.Nc3 Ng6 6.0-0 c6 7.Ba4 d6 8.Bb3 and now the authors gave either 8...Be6 or 8...Be7 as giving Black an equal game. A bit more recently, Horowitz and Reinfeld observed of 4...Ne7, "This time-wasting retreat of the Knight to an inferior square blocks the development of the King Bishop ... . Yet it is a matter of record that this pitfall had a vogue for many years."
