= Faustin Betbeder =

French artist

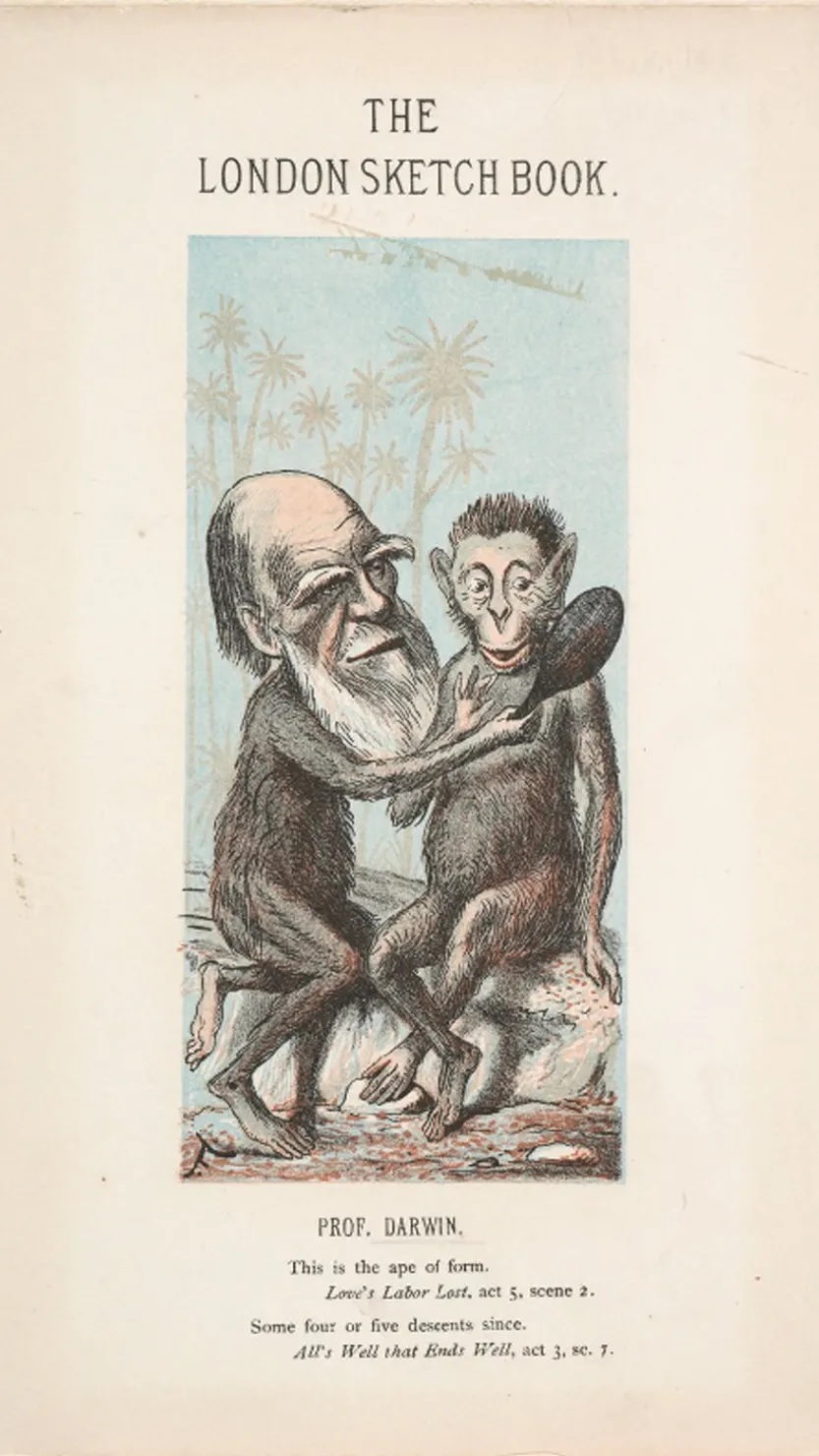
Charles Darwin by Faustin Betbeder (1874)

Faustin Betbeder (1847-1914) was a French illustrator, caricaturist and prototypical comics artist.

== Life and career ==
He was born in Soissons, France in 1847 and lived until sometime around 1914. He became an artist, noted for his unflattering caricatures of personalities from both sides of the Franco-Prussian War and its aftermath. He had difficulty in finding a publisher for the first set of these in 1870 and finally published them himself, selling over 50,000 copies.

After the war he moved to Britain where he set up a printing business. He also produced a less political series of caricatures of well-known British personalities to be published in The London Sketch-book, "An illustrated newspaper and magazine" published from 1873 until 1874 by James Mortimer, editor of The London Figaro. The most famous of these is that of Charles Darwin as an ape holding up a hand mirror for another ape. In addition he designed costumes for theatrical productions, including those for the original 1878 production of H.M.S. Pinafore at the Opera Comique.
