= Fishing Pole Trap =

Chess opening trap

The Fishing Pole is a chess opening trap most common in the Ruy Lopez (especially in the Berlin Defence and Exchange Variation); however, the trap can be used in any opening or in the middlegame. Its broadest definition is a move that sacrifices a knight or bishop on the g-file to open up the h-file, after the opponent has short castled and before the player deploying the trap, usually Black, has short castled.

== Exchange Variation ==
1. e4 e5 2. Nf3 Nc6 3. Bb5 a6 4. Bxc6 dxc6

Black takes with 4...dxc6 to open the diagonal for the bishop, but doubled their pawns, weakening their position in the endgame.

Position: a8 black rook, d8 black queen, e8 black king, f8 black bishop, g8 black knight, h8 black rook, b7 black pawn, c7 black pawn, f7 black pawn, g7 black pawn, a6 black pawn, c6 black pawn, e5 black pawn, h5 black pawn, e4 white pawn, g4 black bishop, f3 white knight, h3 white pawn, a2 white pawn, b2 white pawn, c2 white pawn, d2 white pawn, f2 white pawn, g2 white pawn, a1 white rook, b1 white knight, c1 white bishop, d1 white queen, f1 white rook, g1 white king

1.e4 e5 2.Nf3 Nc6 3.Bb5 a6 4.Bxc6 dxc6 5.0-0 Bg4 6.h3 h5!

5. 0-0 Bg4 6. h3 h5! (diagram)

Black pins the knight to the queen by playing 5...Bg4. White tries to kick the bishop back by playing 6.h3, but Black responds 6...h5!. This move gives the Fishing Pole its name: the black bishop on g4 is the bait and the h5-pawn is the hook.

7. hxg4?? hxg4

A blunder. White should have played 7.d3, allowing them to block the queen from moving 9...Qh4 with 9.Ng5 after 8.hxg4. After 7...hxg4 White will likely make one of two possible blunders:
8. Nxe5?? Qh4! 9. f4 g3 10. Qh5 Rxh5 11. Rf3 Qh1#
After taking the e5-pawn White is 3 points up on material, but checkmate is now inevitable in 4 or less moves after 8...Qh4!
8. Nh2?? Qh4! 9. Re1 Qxh2+ 10. Kf1 Qh1+ 11. Ke2 Qxg2 12. d3 Qf3+ 13. Kd2 Qxf2+
While this blunder avoids checkmate, it does lead to the loss of a knight and two pawns while the white king is left exposed after walking to the queenside.

== Berlin Defense ==
1. e4 e5 2. Nf3 Nc6 3. Bb5 Nf6

The Berlin variation of the Ruy Lopez was made famous in the Classical World Chess Championship 2000 by challenger Vladimir Kramnik, who used it against champion Garry Kasparov. It threatens the pawn on e4 and gets Black ready to castle.

4. 0-0

The most common reply to the Berlin Defense. The king is protected by moving it to the corner and the rook prepares to be moved to e1 if the knight takes on e4.

4... Ng4?? 5. h3

The knight moves away from the center and after 5.h3 it will be kicked back to the f6-square leading to a lost tempo, giving the white knight the chance to take the e5-pawn with the line 5...Nf6 6.Bxc6 dxc6 7.Nxe5.

Position: a8 black rook, c8 black bishop, d8 black queen, e8 black king, f8 black bishop, h8 black rook, a7 black pawn, b7 black pawn, c7 black pawn, d7 black pawn, f7 black pawn, g7 black pawn, c6 black knight, b5 white bishop, e5 black pawn, h5 black pawn, e4 white pawn, g4 black knight, f3 white knight, h3 white pawn, a2 white pawn, b2 white pawn, c2 white pawn, d2 white pawn, f2 white pawn, g2 white pawn, a1 white rook, b1 white knight, c1 white bishop, d1 white queen, f1 white rook, g1 white king

1.e4 e5 2.Nf3 Nc6 3.Bb5 Nf6 4.0-0 Ng4?? 5.h3 h5

5... h5 (diagram)

This move gives the Fishing Pole its name: the black knight on g4 is the bait and the h5-pawn is the hook.

6. hxg4?? hxg4 7. Nh2?? Qh4

Luckily, most players take the bait with a line with two blunders. After 7...Qh4, checkmate in 11 or 6 moves is inevitable with the lines:
8. f4 g3 9. Rf3 Qxh2+ 10. Kf1 Nd4 11. Ke1 Qxg2 12. Rf1 Rh1 13. Qe2 Nxe2 14. Rxh1 Nd4 15. Nc3 Qxh1+ 16. Bf1 g2 17. Kf2 gxf1=Q+ 18. Ke3 Nxc2#
Checkmate in 11 moves with two queens.
8. f3 g3 9. Rf2 Nd4 10. Kf1 gxh2 11. Ke1 h1=Q+ 12. Bf1 Qxf1+ 13. Kxf1 Qh1#
Checkmate in 6 moves with the queen and the knight.
8. Re1 Qxh2+ 9. Kf1 Nd4 10. f4 g3 11. Bxd7+ Bxd7 12. Qh5 Qh1+ 13. Qxh1 Rxh1#
Checkmate in 6 moves with the rook and the knight.

== History ==
The earliest known example of the trap is during the mid-game in Johannes Zukertort–Simon Winawer at the 1883 London Tournament (see diagram). The chess master Johannes Zukertort won the game.

Position: a8 black rook, d8 black queen, e8 black king, h8 black rook, b7 black pawn, c7 black bishop, d7 black knight, f7 black pawn, g7 black pawn, a6 black pawn, c6 black pawn, e6 black pawn, c5 white pawn, d5 black pawn, f5 black bishop, h5 black pawn, a4 white pawn, b4 white pawn, d4 white pawn, g4 black knight, c3 white knight, e3 white pawn, f3 white knight, h3 white pawn, e2 white bishop, f2 white pawn, g2 white pawn, a1 white rook, c1 white bishop, d1 white queen, f1 white rook, g1 white king

1.d4 d5 2.e3 Bf5 3.Nf3 e6 4.Be2 Bd6 5.0-0 Nf6 6.c4 c6 7.Nc3 Nbd7 8.c5 Bc7 9.b4 a6 10.a4 Ng4 11.h3 h5

Move 12 of game 8 of the World Chess Championship 2023 between Ian Nepomniachtchi and Ding Liren used the trap (see diagram).

Ding vs. Nepomniachtchi, game 8

Position: a8 black rook, d8 black queen, f8 black rook, g8 black king, a7 black pawn, f7 black pawn, g7 black pawn, a6 black bishop, b6 black pawn, c6 black knight, d6 black pawn, e6 black pawn, f6 black knight, h6 black pawn, c5 black pawn, g5 white bishop, c4 white pawn, d4 white pawn, e4 white pawn, h4 white pawn, a3 white pawn, c3 white pawn, g3 white knight, a2 white rook, f2 white pawn, g2 white pawn, d1 white queen, e1 white king, f1 white bishop, h1 white rook

1.d4 Nf6 2.c4 e6 3.Nc3 Bb4 4.e3 0-0 5.a3 Bxc3+ 6.bxc3 d6 7.Ne2 c5 8.Ng3 Nc6 9.Ra2 b6 10.e4 Ba6 11.Bg5 h6 12.h4!
