= Dunst Opening =

Position: a8 black rook, b8 black knight, c8 black bishop, d8 black queen, e8 black king, f8 black bishop, g8 black knight, h8 black rook, a7 black pawn, b7 black pawn, c7 black pawn, d7 black pawn, e7 black pawn, f7 black pawn, g7 black pawn, h7 black pawn, c3 white knight, a2 white pawn, b2 white pawn, c2 white pawn, d2 white pawn, e2 white pawn, f2 white pawn, g2 white pawn, h2 white pawn, a1 white rook, c1 white bishop, d1 white queen, e1 white king, f1 white bishop, g1 white knight, h1 white rook
- Moves: 1.Nc3
- ECO: A00
- Origin: Blackburne vs. Noa, London 1883
- Named after: Ted A. Dunst
- Synonyms: Heinrichsen Opening; Baltic Opening; Van Geet Opening; Sleipnir Opening; Kotrč's Opening; Meštrović Opening; Romanian Opening; Queen's Knight Attack; Queen's Knight Opening; Millard's Opening; Knight on the Left; der Linksspringer

The Dunst Opening is a chess opening in which White opens with the move:

1. Nc3

This fairly uncommon opening may have more names than any other: it is also called the Heinrichsen Opening, Baltic Opening, Van Geet Opening, Sleipnir Opening, Kotrč's Opening, Meštrović Opening, Romanian Opening, Queen's Knight Attack, Queen's Knight Opening, Millard's Opening, Knight on the Left, and (in German) der Linksspringer.

The Dunst is considered an irregular opening, so it is classified under the A00 code in the Encyclopaedia of Chess Openings.

== Origin of names ==
The names Heinrichsen and Baltic derive from Lithuanian chess player Arved Heinrichsen (1879–1900). The opening was analyzed and played by the New York master Ted A. Dunst (1907–1985), giving the opening its most popular name in the United States. The Dutch International Master (IM) and correspondence grandmaster Dirk Daniel ("Dick D.") van Geet (1932–2012) frequently played 1.Nc3, so it is often called the Van Geet Opening in the Netherlands. The appellation Sleipnir seems to come from Germany. Sleipnir is Odin's (Wotan in German) magical eight-legged horse, and chess knights are horses with up to eight different possible moves each turn. Czech Jan Kotrč (1862–1943), editor and publisher of the magazine České Listy, said the opening was analyzed by English players. Zvonimir Meštrović (1944–2016) was a Slovenian IM who often adopted this opening. Tim Harding refers to it as the "Queen's Knight Attack" (Harding 1974:8). National Master Hugh Myers called it "Millard's Opening" after Henry Millard (1824–1891), a blind correspondence chess player who drew with the opening in a simultaneous exhibition against Joseph Henry Blackburne. Blackburne later played the opening himself against Josef Noa in the London 1883 international chess tournament (Myers 2002:24–25). The German FIDE Master Harald Keilhack in his 2005 book on the opening states that it has also been referred to as the Romanian Defense, and that he prefers the neutral appellation "Der Linksspringer" or, in English, 'the Knight on the Left' (Keilhack 2005:7).

== General remarks ==
The opening move 1.Nc3 develops the knight to a good square where it attacks the central e4 and d5 squares. Although quite playable, 1.Nc3 is rarely seen; it is only the eighth most popular of the 20 possible first moves, behind 1.e4, 1.d4, 1.Nf3, 1.c4, 1.g3, 1.f4, and 1.b3. As of February 6, 2009, out of the over 500,000 games in Chessgames.com's database, only 644—about 1 out of every 780—begins with 1.Nc3. The third-ranking 1.Nf3 is 66 times as popular. Some very strong correspondence chess players employ 1.Nc3 frequently, and it is occasionally seen over the board.

The reasons for 1.Nc3's lack of popularity are that it does not stop Black from occupying the center (while 1.Nf3 prevents 1...e5, 1.Nc3 does not prevent 1...d5 because the d-pawn is guarded by the queen), and it blocks White's c-pawn from advancing to c3 or c4 (often desirable) without first moving the knight. In addition, after 1...d5, the knight's position is unstable because Black may attack it with ...d4. Although 1.Nc3 develops a piece to a good square (unlike 1.Na3 or 1.Nh3), and does not weaken White's position (unlike, e.g., 1.g4 or 1.f3) or waste time (unlike, e.g., 1.c3), the above-stated drawbacks make it an inferior way of attempting to exploit White's first-move advantage. Of the 644 games with 1.Nc3 in Chessgames.com's database, White won 34.8%, drew 23.9%, and lost 41.3%, for a total winning percentage of only 46.75%. White scores much better with the more popular 1.e4 (54.25%), 1.d4 (55.95%), 1.Nf3 (55.8%), 1.c4 (56.3%), and 1.g3 (55.8%). As of October 2018, however, for the 38,043 games with 1.Nc3 in Lichess.org's database, White has a total winning percentage of 57.25% (55% won, 5% drawn, 40% lost), although it is still only the tenth-most popular first move for White. As a testament to Nc3 as an interesting move choice to simplify opening theory yet being effective: After 1.e4 d5 the usual 2.exd5 is 48% win rate for White while 2.Nc3 has a 49% win rate as of 30 July 2022 – albeit with less sample size but still over 300,000 games. This could arise from the mainline of this article from 1.Nc3 d5 2.e4 which shows in fact the Dunst system is actually being regularly used online with great effect.

== Possible continuations ==
=== 1...d5 ===
This is one of Black's best replies, occupying the center and undermining the unsettled position of White's knight. White can prevent 2...d4 by playing 2.d4 themselves, transposing to a well-known position in the Queen's Pawn Game, where after 2...Nf6 White can choose to play a Jobava London system with 3.Bf4, a Veresov Attack with 3.Bg5, or transpose to the Blackmar–Deimer Gambit with 3.e4?!

Also possible is 2.Nf3 (and if 2...d4, 3.Ne4), a sort of Black Knights' Tango with an extra move (Harding 1974:10).

A third line is 2.e3, which Keilhack calls "the Müller game", when White anticipates 2...e5 (other moves are also playable) 3.Qh5!?, e.g. 3...Nc6 4.Bb5 Qd6 5.d4 exd4 6.exd4 Nf6 7.Qe5+! Be6?! (Keilhack recommends 7...Kd8!! 8.Bxc6 bxc6 9.Nf3 Bg4) 8.Bf4 0-0-0 9.Bxc6 Qxc6? 10.Nb5!, when White wins at least a pawn (Keilhack 2005:307–11).

White's most common response to 1...d5 is 2.e4. This is the same position as 1.e4 d5 2.Nc3, an obscure branch of the Scandinavian Defense. Black has five plausible responses to 2.e4: 2...e6 and 2...c6 transpose to the French and Caro–Kann Defenses, and 2...Nf6 to a variation of Alekhine's Defense. The move 2...d4 gives Black a spatial advantage, which White may work to undermine along the lines of hypermodernism. Keilhack writes, "2...d4 is chosen either by somewhat naive players who are attracted by the fact that Black wins time and space ... or by strong players who are aware of the strategic risks but are striving for a complex battle." (Keilhack 2005:44) He considers the Van Geet Attack, 2...d4 3.Nce2 followed by 4.Ng3, to be "the core of the 1.Nc3 opening", "a fully independent entity which strives for early knight activity on the kingside", usually with Ng3, Nf3, Bc4 or Bb5, 0-0, and d3 (Keilhack 2005:44). Alternative lines for White include the unusual 3.Nb1!?, with which van Geet once drew Boris Spassky, and, after 3.Nce2, playing a sort of King's Indian Attack with d3, g3, Bg2, f4, Nf3, and 0-0 – a line Keilhack calls the "Lizard Attack" (Keilhack 2005:125).

The unnamed line with Ng3, Nf3, and Bc4 is essentially a reversed-color version of the Nimzowitsch Defense, Kennedy Variation, Linksspringer Variation, or the Mikenas Defense, Lithuanian Variation. For this reason, the designation "Lithuanian Attack" could be considered. See also the Black Knights' Tango after 1.d4 Nf6 2.c4 Nc6 3.Nc3 e5 4.d5 Ne7.

The fifth alternative, 1...d5 2.e4 dxe4, leads to more open play. After 3.Nxe4, Black has a number of playable moves, including 3...e5, 3...Nc6, 3...Bf5, 3...Nd7, 3...Nf6, and even 3...Qd5!?, when 4.Nc3 transposes to the Scandinavian Defense (Keilhack 2005:131, 144, 146, 158, 172, 176). After 3...e5, White's thematic move is 4.Bc4, when several of Black's plausible moves lead to disaster, e.g. 4...Be7? 5.Qh5! and White wins at least a pawn after 5...g6 6.Qxe5 or 5...Nh6 6.d3; or 4...Nf6? 5.Ng5! Nd5 and now 6.d4!, 6.Qf3!, and 6.Nxf7!? Kxf7 7.Qf3+ are all possible, with positions similar to the line of the Two Knights Defense beginning 1.e4 e5 2.Nf3 Nc6 3.Bc4 Nf6 4.Ng5 d5 5.exd5 Nxd5?! (Keilhack 2005:133–34). However, 3...e5 4.Bc4 Nc6! is playable (Keilhack 2005:135–43).

IM Richard Palliser, in his 2006 book Beating Unusual Chess Openings, recommends 1...d5 2.e4 dxe4 3.Nxe4 Nd7 for Black. He explains, "Black doesn't attempt to refute White's opening or to gain lots of space (as with 2...d4), but simply settles for sensible development. The position should be compared to both a Caro–Kann Defense and a French Rubinstein. Black will hope to demonstrate that he has gained from the omission of an early ...c6 or ...e6, while White will generally omit d4, preferring a setup with Bc4 and d3" (Palliser 2006:143). After 4.Bc4, the natural move 4...Ngf6!? leads to very sharp and unclear play if White responds with 5.Bxf7+!? Kxf7 6.Ng5+ Kg8 7.Ne6 Qe8 8.Nxc7 (Keilhack 2005:158–63) (Palliser 2006:144–46). More solid is 4...e6 ("!" – Keilhack) (Keilhack 2005:164–70) (Palliser 2006:144–48).

=== 1...c5 ===
1...c5 is often played by devotees of the Sicilian Defense, into which the game often transposes, either immediately after 2.e4 or at a later point. Alternatively, White can remain in independent 1.Nc3 lines, at least for the time being, with 2.Nf3 followed by 3.d4, which gives Black a large choice of possible responses. One line Palliser recommends for Black is 2.Nf3 Nf6 3.d4 (3.e4 transposes to a Sicilian) cxd4 4.Nxd4 d5!? (seizing the center) 5.Bg5 Nbd7! 6.e4 (more critical than the passive 6.e3?!) dxe4 7.Qe2 e6!? 8.0-0-0 Be7 9.Nxe4 0-0 when "White doesn't appear to have any advantage" (Palliser 2006:154–56).

If White chooses to transpose to standard Sicilian lines, the fact that his knight is committed to c3 may be a disadvantage in certain lines. The Closed Sicilian, commonly reached by 1.e4 c5 2.Nc3, without an early d4 by White, gives Black few theoretical difficulties (de Firmian 2008:346). If White instead chooses to play an Open Sicilian with 2.e4 and 3.Nf3 or Nge2, followed by d4, the knight's placement on c3 prevents White from playing the Maróczy Bind with c4. This makes the Accelerated Dragon Variation with 2...Nc6 and 3...g6 particularly attractive (Gallagher 1994:146). Black may also stop White's intended d4 by playing an early ...e5, e.g. 1.Nc3 c5 2.e4 Nc6 3.Nf3 e5 (Gallagher 1994:151–55) or 3.Nge2 e5 (Gallagher 1994:148–51).

=== 1...Nf6 ===
Grandmaster Larry Kaufman recommends 1...Nf6, intending to meet 2.e4 with 2...e5 or 2.d4 with 2...d5 (Kaufman 2004:484). Keilhack writes that "1...Nf6 is one of the most unpleasant replies for the 1.Nc3 player. Black keeps all options open, he can choose between a central (...d5, possibly followed by ...c5) and an Indian (...g6, ...Bg7) setup. ... Among the many possible [second] moves [for White], none really stands out." (Keilhack 2005:338). The most straightforward moves for White are 2.d4 and 2.e4, but neither promises White a significant advantage. After 2.d4, 2...d5 leads to the Richter–Veresov Attack (3.Bg5) or another type of Queen's Pawn Game such as a Jobava London System, where White, having blocked his c-pawn, has little chance for an advantage (Kaufman 2004:469, 473). After 2.e4, Black can again play 2...d5 with a variation of the Alekhine's Defense; or 2...d6 3.d4 g6 with a Pirc Defense or 3...e5 with a Philidor's Defense. The most solid response to 2.e4 is 2...e5, leading to a Vienna Game or, after 3.Nf3 Nc6, to a Four Knights Game—neither of which offers White an appreciable advantage (Kaufman 2004:364–65) (de Firmian 2008:121). Keilhack also analyzes a number of offbeat possibilities, including 2.b3, 2.Nf3, 2.f4 (an unusual form of Bird's Opening that Keilhack calls the "Aasum System"), 2.g3, and even the gambit 2.g4?! Palliser writes that none of the alternatives to 2.e4 "really convince or should greatly trouble Black over the board" (Palliser 2006:142).

=== 1...e5 ===
This natural move is probably playable, but already a slight inaccuracy as White maintains an opening advantage in all lines. It is also particularly dangerous if Black does not know what he is doing, with numerous traps and knight tactics which Black must avoid. One of the main lines is 1...e5 2.Nf3 Nc6 3.d4, known as the Napoleon Attack, with poor chances for Black, continued by 3...exd4 4.Nxd4 Nf6 5.Bg5. Keilhack writes that this variation "occurs rather often and offers excellent chances for an early knockout" by White and that "only two [moves] (5...Bb4 and 5...Bc5) do not immediately ruin Black's game" (Keilhack 2005:26). (See, e.g., the Dunst–Gresser game given below.)

The Napoleon Attack often leads to very sharp branching lines in which White, in the early phase of the opening, develops both knights to the 5th rank on the opponent’s half of the board. When this setup is achieved, the two white knights stand on light squares separated by a single dark square. This geometric pattern resembles two light layers divided by a darker filling, which led to the name Pancake Variation. Example continuations: 3...exd4 4.Nxd4 Nf6 5.Bg5 Be7 7.Nf5 Bf8 8. Nd5 and 3...exd4 4.Nxd4 g6 5.Nd5 Nb4 6.Nb5, or very risky 3...exd4 4.Nxd4 Bc5 5.Nf5 Bf2+ 6.Kf2 Qf6 7.e4 g6 8.Nd5.

Additionally, White can opt to immediately transpose into mainstream opening territory with 2.e4, leading the game into King's Pawn Openings such as the Vienna Game, or Four Knights Game; however, it is thought that 2.Nf3 followed by 3.d4 is White's best chance of gaining an advantage out of the opening.

== Transpositions to other openings ==
The move 1.Nc3 is considered an irregular opening, so it is classified under the A00 code in the Encyclopaedia of Chess Openings (see also List of chess openings). Transpositions to more common openings are possible, many of which are discussed in the preceding section. In addition, 1.Nc3 d5 2.e4 reaches a position in the Scandinavian Defense; 1.Nc3 e5 2.Nf3 Nc6 3.d4 exd4 4.Nxd4 Nf6 5.e4 leads to a Scotch Four Knights Game; 1.Nc3 e5 2.Nf3 Nc6 3.e4 Bc5 or 3...g6 gives a Three Knights Game; 1.Nc3 Nc6 2.d4 d5 3.e4, or 2...e5 and now 3.d5 Nce7 4.e4 or 3.dxe5 Nxe5 4.e4, yields a Nimzowitsch Defense; and 1.Nc3 b6 2.e4 Bb7 3.d4 is an Owen's Defense. Transposition to a Dutch Defense is also possible after 1.Nc3 f5 2.d4, but Keilhack considers 2.e4! more dangerous, intending 2...fxe4 3.d3, a reversed From's Gambit (Keilhack 2005:369–70). Black alternatives to 2...fxe4 include 2...d6, when 3.d4 transposes to the Balogh Defense; and 2...e5?!, when 3.Nf3 produces a Latvian Gambit, but 3.exf5!, as in a game between Wilhelm Steinitz and Sam Loyd, may be stronger.

== Sample games ==
- Here is a quick victory by Dunst himself against nine-time U.S. Women's Champion Gisela Gresser. It illustrates the problems that White's rapid development can pose if Black is not careful:

Dunst vs. Gresser, New York 1950
1. Nc3 e5 2. Nf3 Nc6 3. d4 exd4 4. Nxd4 Nf6 5. Bg5 d5? (better is 5...Bb4 6.Nxc6 bxc6 7.Qd4 Be7 8.e4 0-0 9.Bd3 h6 10.Bf4 d5 11.0-0 dxe4 and the game was soon drawn in Ekebjaerg–Oim, 14th World Correspondence Chess Championship) 6. e4! Be7 7. Bb5 Bd7 8. exd5 Nxd5 9. Nxd5 Bxg5 10. Qe2+ Ne7? (Losing at once. 10...Be7 11.0-0-0 is also very awkward. Although it's unpleasant, Black should have tried 10...Kf8.) 11. Qe5! Bxb5? (11...0-0! 12.Qxg5 Nxd5 13.Qxd5 c6 and Black wins a piece back) 12. Nxc7+ Kf8 13. Nde6+ (now 13...fxe6 14.Ne6+ wins Black's queen) 1–0 (notes based on those by Tim Harding)

- Van Geet, another champion of the opening, routs his opponent almost as quickly:

Van Geet vs. Guyt, Paramaribo 1967
1. Nc3 d5 2. e4 d4 3. Nce2 e5 4. Ng3 g6 5. Bc4 Bg7 6. d3 c5 7. Nf3 Nc6 8. c3 Nge7 9. Ng5 0-0 (Now White has a surprising attacking move.) 10. Nh5! Bh8 (10...gxh5 11.Qxh5 h6 12.Nxf7 is disastrous; 10...Na5 11.Nxg7 Nxc4! 12.dxc4 Kxg7 is forced.) 11. Qf3 Qe8 12. Nf6+ Bxf6 13. Qxf6 dxc3 (This loses by force. Again it was necessary to harass the bishop at c4 by ... Na5.) 14. Nxf7 Rxf7 15. Bh6 1–0 (notes based on those by Eric Schiller at Chessgames.com)

== See also ==
- List of chess openings
- List of chess openings named after people
