= Barendregt =

Barendregt is a Dutch surname. Notable people with the surname include:

- Jaap Barendregt (1905–1952), Dutch footballer
- Johan Barendregt (1924–1982), Dutch chess player
- Henk Barendregt (born 1947), Dutch logician
