= London 1883 chess tournament =

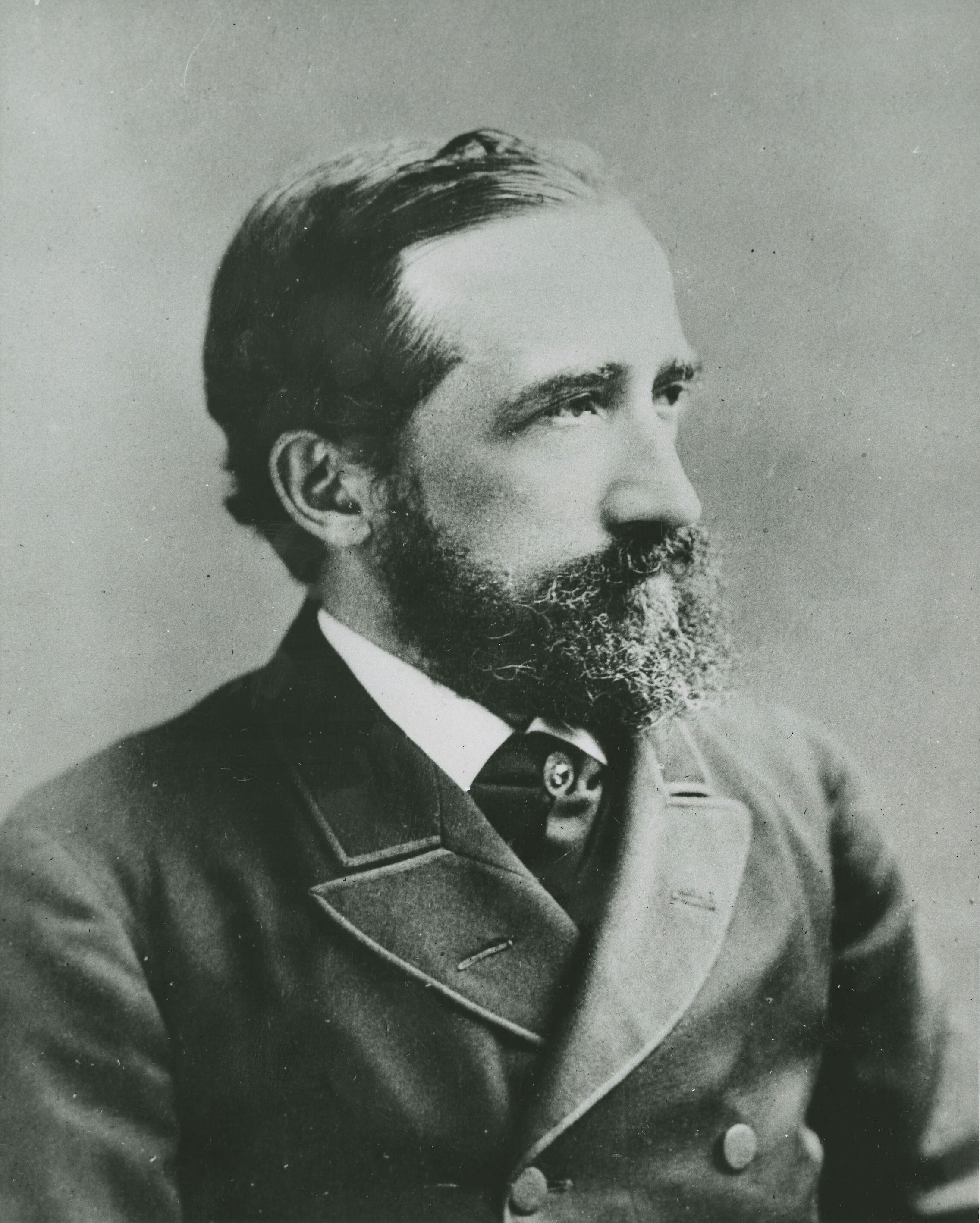
Johannes Zukertort, winner of the tournament

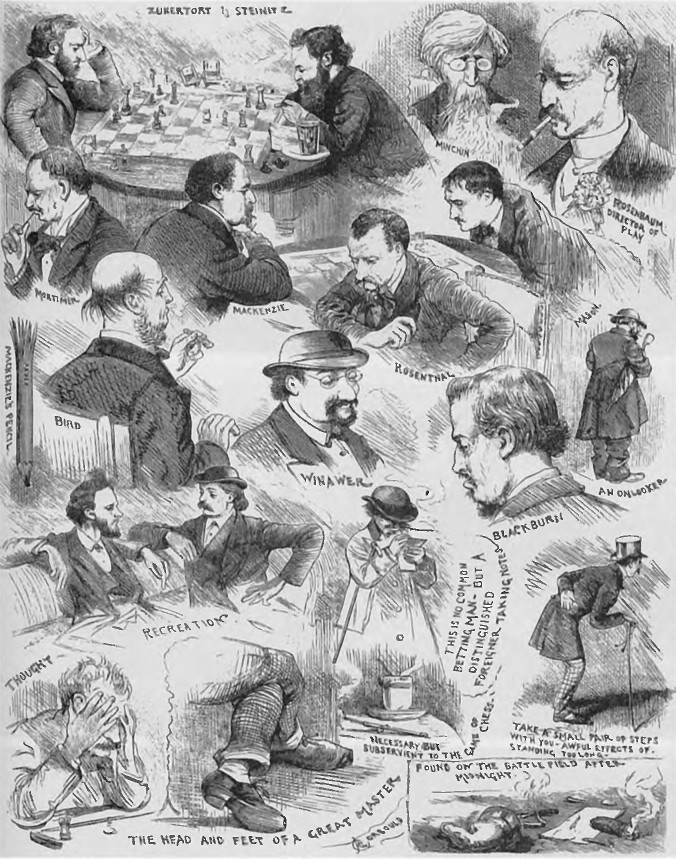
The London 1883 chess tournament, The Illustrated London News, 5 May 1883

The London 1883 chess tournament was a strong chess tournament among most of the leading players of the day. It was won convincingly by Johannes Zukertort (22 points out of 26) ahead of Wilhelm Steinitz (with 19 points). Remarkably, Zukertort was already assured of victory with three rounds to go, having scored an astonishing 22/23. He then lost his last three games against relatively weak players, probably due to exhaustion. The tournament established Zukertort as rivalling Steinitz to claim to be the best player in the world, and led to the World Chess Championship 1886 match between the two (the first official World Chess Championship match). The event was a double round-robin tournament. Marmaduke Wyvill contributed to organizing the tournament.

== Introduction of the chess clock ==
The tournament was also notable for the first use of the double-sided chess clock, invented and manufactured by Thomas Bright Wilson of Manchester Chess Club.

== Claims to being the best chess player ==
A common story relates to an incident that occurred at the tournament banquet, when the St. George Chess Club President proposed a toast to the best chess player in the world and both Steinitz and Zukertort stood up at the same time to thank him. Research by Edward Winter suggests that this story has been embellished.

== Irregularities ==
A game between Mason and Winawer was played, adjourned and resumed, but upon resumption the black knight on e7 was mistakenly placed on d7. Neither player noticed at the time and Winawer played the illegal, but powerful, Nc5! setting up a Ne4+ and eventually winning the match, with the mistake not being spotted until after the game concluded. It was not until days later that the mistake was noticed.

== Patronage ==
The tournament book was dedicated to Prince Leopold, Duke of Albany, for his patronage of the tournament.

== Crosstable ==
The results and standings:

#	Player	1	2	3	4	5	6	7	8	9	10	11	12	13	14	Total
1	Johannes Zukertort (United Kingdom)		01	d11	1d1	1d0	dd11	11	11	d1d1	11	11	10	10	1+	22
2	Wilhelm Steinitz (Austria-Hungary)	10		01	00	11	0dd1	1d1	d0d0	11	11	1d1	11	1d1	1+	19
3	Joseph Henry Blackburne (United Kingdom)	d00	10		01	d00	1d0	1d1	d1d-	dd½dd1	0d1	1d1	d11	11	11	16½
4	Mikhail Chigorin (Russian Empire)	0d0	11	10		11	0d1	d01	0dd1	10	10	d10	1d1	10	1+	16
5	George Henry Mackenzie (United States)	0d1	00	d11	00		dd½dd½	0d1	d0d1	01	0d1	1d1	dd½d1	d11	1+	15½
6	Berthold Englisch (Austria-Hungary)	dd00	1dd0	0dd1	1d0	dd½dd½		dd00	dd½dd1	01	d01	11	d11	11	1+	15½
7	James Mason (United Kingdom)	00	0d0	0d0	d10	1d0	dd11		d10	d10	11	dd½1	1dd1	d11	1+	15½
8	Samuel Rosenthal (France)	00	d1d1	d0d-	1dd0	d1d0	dd½dd0	d01		dd½dd1	d10	01	d01	11	d1+	14
9	Szymon Winawer (Russian Empire)	d0d0	00	dd½dd0	01	10	10	d01	dd½dd0		d01	dd10	1d1	11	1+	13
10	Henry Edward Bird (United Kingdom)	00	00	1d0	01	1d0	d10	00	d01	d10		00	11	d11	d1+	12
11	Josef Noa (Austria-Hungary)	00	0d0	0d0	d01	0d0	00	dd½0	10	dd01	11		01	11	0+	9½
12	Alexander Sellman (United States)	01	00	d00	0d0	dd½d0	d00	0dd0	d10	0d0	00	10		11	0+	6½
13	James Mortimer (United Kingdom)	01	0d0	00	01	d00	00	d00	00	00	d00	00	00		01	3
14	Arthur Skipworth (United Kingdom)	0-	0-	00	0-	0-	0-	0-	d0-	0-	d0-	1-	1-	10		3

In this tournament a game ending in a draw was replayed at least twice. The third game after two draws would count, whatever the result. In the table, "+" indicates win by default, "-" indicates loss by default or unplayed game, "d" indicates a drawn game that was replayed and not counted towards the final score.

Skipworth withdrew from the tournament two games after the half way point; the remainder of his games were scored as losses. The final game between Rosenthal and Blackburne was not replayed as by that point it was clear that it would have had no impact on the final result of the tournament.
