= The London Figaro =

The London Figaro was a London periodical devoted to politics, literature, art, criticism and satire during the Victorian era. It was founded as a daily paper in 1870 with the backing of Napoleon III but after a year re-established itself as a general interest weekly magazine and is chiefly remembered nowadays for its highly independent drama criticism.

The first issue was published by James Mortimer on 17 May 1870, from a small shop at 199 Strand. It was initially a daily periodical and continued to be published daily until 18 March 1871. At this point it changed format from a newspaper to a weekly magazine owing to the withdrawal of its financial support as a result of French defeat in the Franco-Prussian War.

Among those who contributed to it were William Archer (writing as Almaviva, drama critic), Ernest Bendall, Faustin Betbeder (Faustin, caricaturist), Percy Betts (Cherubino, musical critic), Ambrose Bierce (Passing Showman, Town Crier), Edward Bradley (Cuthbert Bede), Aglen Dowty (Young and Happy Husband, OPQ Philander Smiff), John Baker Hopkins, Frank Marshall, Edwin Milliken, Clement Scott (Almaviva, drama critic), and Edward Blanchard (drama critic). Mortimer was a chess master and so the Figaro had a chess column, which from 1872 until 1876 was contributed by Johann Löwenthal and from 1876 to 1882 by Wilhelm Steinitz.

The magazine became very popular during the mid-1870s and for several years was published twice a week. Mortimer was very supportive of his writers and in particular strove to shield the identities of his drama critics, Clement Scott, and later William Archer, both of whom wrote under the pseudonym, Almaviva. Mortimer suffered much personal abuse from actors and promoters as a result.

In 1879 Mortimer was the defendant in a libel case brought against him by William Henry Weldon as a result of the serial which the Figaro had run on the topic of Georgina Weldon, his wife, who claimed that she had been unjustly confined under the lunacy laws of the time. Owing to a combination of misfortune and bad decisions Mortimer lost the case and was sentenced to three months in prison and a heavy fine.

In 1882 Mortimer sold the Figaro. Writing in Journalistic London later in the year, Joseph Hatton said:

The Figaro once prospered exceedingly. Its founder, Mr. James Mortimer, an American with a French training in journalism, first introduced it to London as a daily paper. He was unfortunate in challenging attention for a light, chatty, and serio-comic treatment of current news and literature at a time when the public mind was excited with the tragedies of a great war. Otherwise the daily Figaro might possibly have been alive now. A weekly edition reached an enormous circulation. Its chief leader-writer was Mr. John Baker Hopkins, a journalist who for many years was associated with The Law Journal. Mr. Hopkins is the author of "Nihilism ; or, The Terror Unmasked," and several works of fiction. "The Smiff Papers" did much to extend the circulation of The Figaro, as did also the dramatic criticisms signed "Alma Viva." Mr. Doughty was the author of the first mentioned feature, Mr. Clement Scott of the second. Recently the paper has been taken over by a limited liability company, and Mr. Mortimer appears to be giving more attention to play-writing than to journalism.

The magazine continued publication for another 15 years. By the late 1890s, however, it had lost much of its readership; and at a shareholders' Extraordinary General Meeting in December 1897, it was agreed to wind it up.
