= World Chess Championship 1908 =

Chess match between Emanuel Lasker and Siegbert Tarrasch

	Defending champion	Challenger
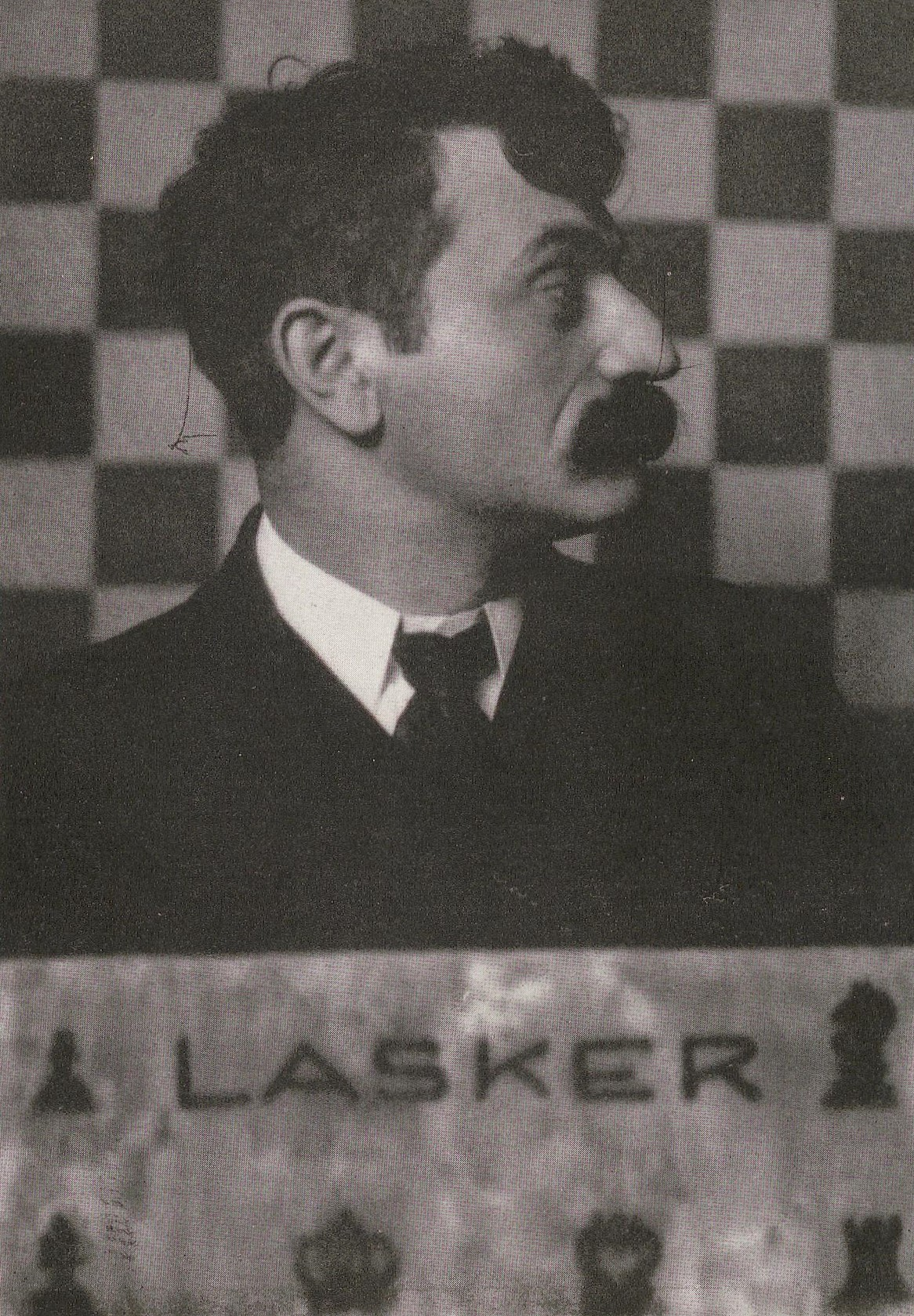
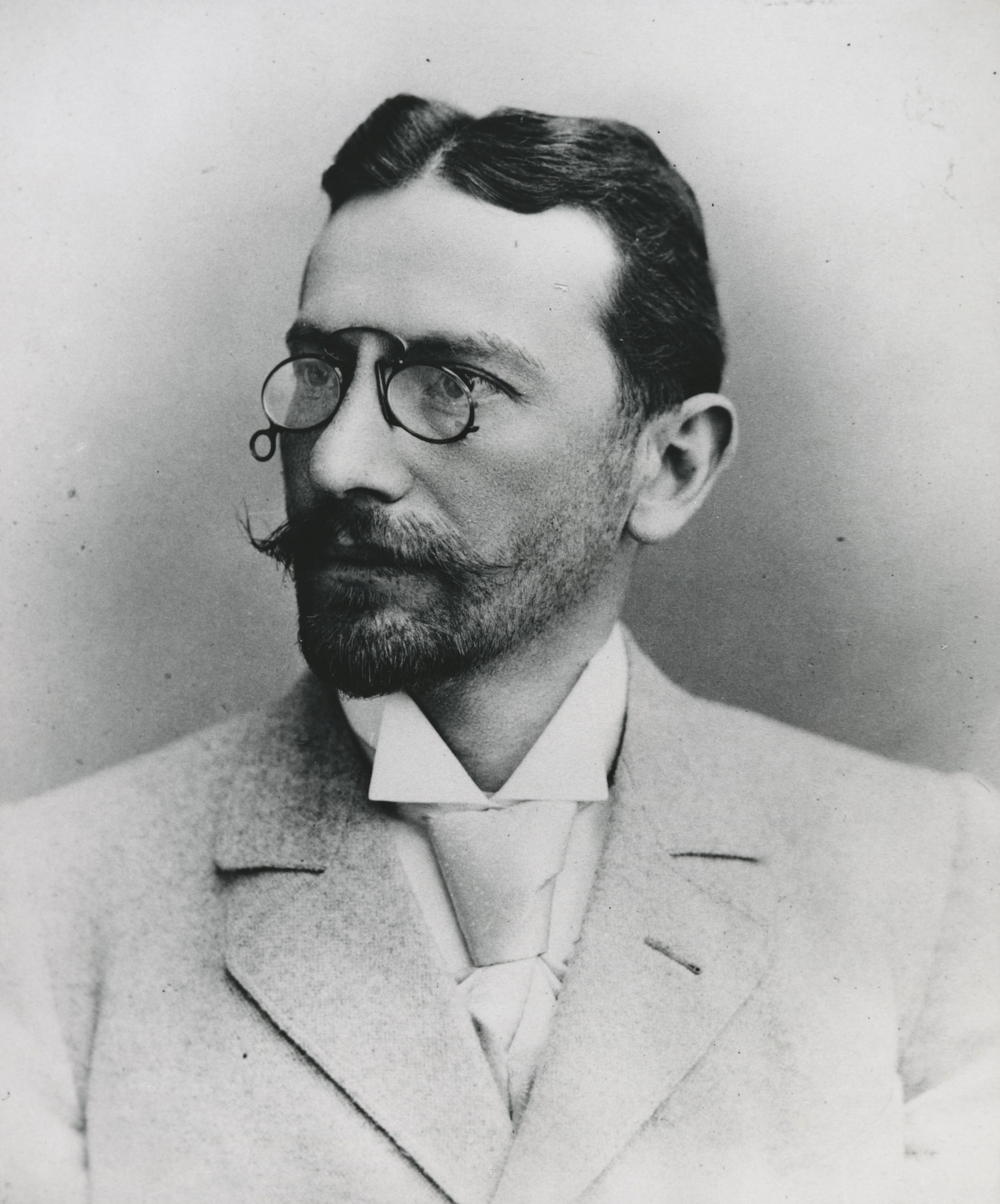
	Emanuel Lasker	Siegbert Tarrasch
	(German Empire) Emanuel Lasker	(German Empire) Siegbert Tarrasch
10½	Scores	5½
	Born 24 December 1868; 39 years old	Born 5 March 1862; 46 years old

A World Chess Championship was played between the incumbent Emanuel Lasker and the challenger Siegbert Tarrasch, both Germans, from August 17 to September 30, 1908, in Düsseldorf and Munich. Lasker successfully defended his title.

Lasker had become world champion in 1894, and Tarrasch had consistently refused to play for the world championship, and though he was perceived to be one of the strongest players in the world in the 1890's, he had failed to issue a challenge to Wilhelm Steinitz, making it all the more surprising that he played his first and only against Lasker, as the two of them were known not to be on good terms. Tarrasch won the Ostend 1907 chess tournament, which qualified him for the championship, and the terms of the match were agreed by July 1908.

Though contemporary commentators predicted a close-fought match, in the event Lasker took an early lead and maintained it, winning convincingly with 8 wins to 3.

== Background ==
It was decided that the winner of the Ostend 1907 chess tournament would challenge Lasker in the next championship, with Tarrasch winning by half a point.

The German Chess Federation approached Lasker in June of 1908 to discuss the conditions of the match, which were agreed to by the players in July: The winner would be the first to eight wins; the time control was one hour for every 15 moves with an adjournment after six hours; the prize fund would be 4000 Marks, with the runner-up receiving 2500 Marks. Lasker also received an appearance fee of 7500 Marks.

The two had never played a major match against each other, though they had been rivals for years at this point. Lasker had challenged Tarrasch in 1892 to a match, but the latter declined, offering to play once the former had won an international tournament, which he duly did two years later, defeating Steinitz to become world champion. The two consistently avoided each other over the next few years, with a match almost taking place in 1904, but being abandoned over a dispute over a postponement, which Tarrasch had requested due to an alleged skating accident.

== Results ==
The first player to win eight games would be the World Champion.

World Chess Championship Match 1908
	1	2	3	4	5	6	7	8	9	10	11	12	13	14	15	16	Wins	Total
Emanuel Lasker (Germany)	1	1	0	1	1	½	1	½	½	0	1	0	1	½	½	1	8	10½
Siegbert Tarrasch (Germany)	0	0	1	0	0	½	0	½	½	1	0	1	0	½	½	0	3	5½

Lasker retained his title.

Game 14, which lasted for 119 moves, held the record for the longest game in a world championship until Game 5 of the 1978 championship, which lasted 124 moves.

== Games ==
=== Game 1: Lasker–Tarrasch, 1–0 ===
Lasker–Tarrasch, game 1

Position: b6 black pawn, c6 black pawn, e6 white king, a5 black pawn, c5 black pawn, a4 white pawn, c4 white pawn, e4 black king, b3 white pawn, f3 white knight

Position after 52.Ke6. This attraction tactic threatened to win a tempo in the race to the queenside pawn cluster.

Following a fairly balanced middlegame, by move 24, the white king was able to become active, with the imbalance of kingside majority despite the material equality. Tarrasch made an inaccuracy with 35...Bd7, instead of capturing the knight, allowing the knight to move to g3 at any time to prevent Rh1 infiltration, which happened shortly afterwards. With 52.Ke6, white sacrificed his knight as an attraction tactic, which was not accepted by black. White arrived to protect the a- and c-pawns anyway with 55.Kb5, leading to Tarrasch's resignation.

Ruy Lopez, Exchange Variation (ECO C68)
1.e4 e5 2.Nf3 Nc6 3.Bb5 a6 4.Bxc6 dxc6 5.d4 exd4 6.Qxd4 Qxd4 7.Nxd4 c5 8.Ne2 Bd7 9.b3 Bc6 10.f3 Be7 11.Bb2 Bf6 12.Bxf6 Nxf6 13.Nd2 0-0-0 14.0-0-0 Rd7 15.Nf4 Re8 16.Nc4 b6 17.a4 a5 18.Rxd7 Nxd7 19.Rd1 Ne5 20.Nxe5 Rxe5 21.c4 Re8 22.Nh5 Rg8 23.Rd3 f6 24.Kd2 Be8 25.Ng3 Bd7 26.Ke3 Re8 27.Nh5 Re7 28.g4 c6 29.h4 Kc7 30.g5 f5 31.Ng3 fxe4 32.Nxe4 Bf5 33.h5 Rd7 34.Rc3 Rd1 35.Kf4 Bd7 36.Re3 Rh1 37.Ng3 Rh4+ 38.Ke5 Rh3 39.f4 Kd8 40.f5 Rh4 41.f6 gxf6 42.Kxf6 Be8 43.Nf5 Rf4 44.g6 hxg6 45.hxg6 Rg4 46.Rxe8+ Kxe8 47.g7 Kd7 48.Nh4 Rxg7 49.Kxg7 Ke6 50.Nf3 Kf5 51.Kf7 Ke4 52.Ke6 Kd3 53.Kd6 Kc3 54.Kxc6 Kxb3 55.Kb5 1–0

=== Game 2: Tarrasch–Lasker, 0–1 ===
Tarrasch gained a commanding position early in the game, after finding 15.Bxg7, which gave him an attack he failed to fully capitalise on, missing the crucial line after 15...Nxf2 of 16.Qd4!, instead recapturing the knight right away with the king, albeit maintaining a better position. Lasker began his counterattack after 19.Qxa7, as his king was now brought to safety. Lasker gained an advantage following move 32 by finding the reroute of the rook and queen to White's kingside. Lasker continued to build his advantage, and Tarrasch blundered with 40.a4??, which Lasker followed up with 40...f3 leaving White likely forced to sacrifice his queen in order to avoid checkmate on e1.

Ruy Lopez (ECO C66)
1.e4 e5 2.Nf3 Nc6 3.Bb5 Nf6 4.0-0 d6 5.d4 Bd7 6.Nc3 Be7 7.Re1 exd4 8.Nxd4 0-0 9.Nxc6 Bxc6 10.Bxc6 bxc6 11.Ne2 Qd7 12.Ng3 Rfe8 13.b3 Rad8 14.Bb2 Ng4 15.Bxg7 Nxf2 16.Kxf2 Kxg7 17.Nf5+ Kh8 18.Qd4+ f6 19.Qxa7 Bf8 20.Qd4 Re5 21.Rad1 Rde8 22.Qc3 Qf7 23.Ng3 Bh6 24.Qf3 d5 25.exd5 Be3+ 26.Kf1 cxd5 27.Rd3 Qe6 28.Re2 f5 29.Rd1 f4 30.Nh1 d4 31.Nf2 Qa6 32.Nd3 Rg5 33.Ra1 Qh6 34.Ke1 Qxh2 35.Kd1 Qg1+ 36.Ne1 Rge5 37.Qc6 R5e6 38.Qxc7 R8e7 39.Qd8+ Kg7 40.a4 f3 41.gxf3 Bg5 0–1

=== Game 3: Lasker–Tarrasch, 0–1 ===
Ruy Lopez, Closed, Chigorin (ECO C99)
1.e4 e5 2.Nf3 Nc6 3.Bb5 a6 4.Ba4 Nf6 5.0-0 Be7 6.Re1 b5 7.Bb3 d6 8.c3 Na5 9.Bc2 c5 10.d4 Qc7 11.Nbd2 Nc6 12.h3 0-0 13.Nf1 cxd4 14.cxd4 Nxd4 15.Nxd4 exd4 16.Ng3 Nd7 17.Bb3 Qb6 18.Nf5 Bf6 19.Bf4 Ne5 20.Bd5 Ra7 21.Qb3 Rc7 22.g4 g6 23.Nh6+ Kg7 24.g5 Bd8 25.Qg3 f6 26.Nf5+ Kh8 27.Nh4 fxg5 28.Bxg5 Bxg5 29.Qxg5 d3 30.Kh1 Rc2 31.Re3 Rfxf2 32.Ng2 d2 33.Rg1 Rc1 34.Qe7 Rxg1+ 35.Kxg1 d1=Q+ 36.Kxf2 Qf3+ 37.Ke1 Qa5+ 38.Rc3 Bxh3 39.Qxd6 Qaxc3+ 40.bxc3 Qxc3+ 41.Ke2 Qc2+ 42.Ke3 Qd3+ 43.Kf4 g5+ 44.Kxg5 Nf7+ 0–1

=== Game 4: Tarrasch–Lasker, 0–1 ===
Ruy Lopez (ECO C66)
1.e4 e5 2.Nf3 Nc6 3.Bb5 Nf6 4.0-0 d6 5.d4 Bd7 6.Nc3 Be7 7.Re1 exd4 8.Nxd4 Nxd4 9.Qxd4 Bxb5 10.Nxb5 0-0 11.Bg5 h6 12.Bh4 Re8 13.Rad1 Nd7 14.Bxe7 Rxe7 15.Qc3 Re5 16.Nd4 Rc5 17.Qb3 Nb6 18.f4 Qf6 19.Qf3 Re8 20.c3 a5 21.b3 a4 22.b4 Rc4 23.g3 Rd8 24.Re3 c5 25.Nb5 cxb4 26.Rxd6 Rxd6 27.e5 Rxf4 28.gxf4 Qg6+ 29.Kh1 Qb1+ 30.Kg2 Rd2+ 31.Re2 Qxa2 32.Rxd2 Qxd2+ 33.Kg3 a3 34.e6 Qe1+ 35.Kg4 Qxe6+ 36.f5 Qc4+ 37.Nd4 a2 38.Qd1 Nd5 39.Qa4 Nxc3 40.Qe8+ Kh7 41.Kh5 a1=Q 0–1

=== Game 5: Lasker–Tarrasch, 1–0 ===
The first 15 moves of this game were the same as the third game, with Lasker diverting the position with 16.Bg5. He said the point of this move was "either to get rid of Black's important King's Bishop or to hamper its development." He was disdainful of 17...Qb6, branding it as "too passive". Lasker built his advantage, and Tarrasch blundered with 25...f5, allowing an en passant capture, opening up Black's king to an attack. 37...Qc6 blunders mate in 9.

Ruy Lopez, Closed, Chigorin (ECO C98)
1.e4 e5 2.Nf3 Nc6 3.Bb5 a6 4.Ba4 Nf6 5.0-0 Be7 6.Re1 b5 7.Bb3 d6 8.c3 Na5 9.Bc2 c5 10.d4 Qc7 11.Nbd2 Nc6 12.h3 0-0 13.Nf1 cxd4 14.cxd4 Nxd4 15.Nxd4 exd4 16.Bg5 h6 17.Bh4 Qb6 18.Qd3 g5 19.Bg3 Be6 20.Rad1 Rfc8 21.Bb1 Nd7 22.e5 Nf8 23.Qf3 d5 24.Qh5 Kg7 25.f4 f5 26.exf6 Bxf6 27.fxg5 hxg5 28.Be5 d3+ 29.Kh1 Ng6 30.Qxg5 Bf7 31.Ng3 Bxe5 32.Rxe5 Rh8 33.Bxd3 Ra7 34.Rde1 Kf8 35.Bxg6 Qxg6 36.Qe3 Rc7 37.Nf5 Qc6 38.Qg5 1–0

=== Game 6: Tarrasch–Lasker, ½–½ ===
French Defence (ECO C10)
1.e4 e6 2.d4 d5 3.Nc3 dxe4 4.Nxe4 Nf6 5.Nxf6+ Qxf6 6.Nf3 Bd7 7.Bg5 Qg6 8.Bd3 f5 9.h4 Nc6 10.Qe2 h6 11.Bf4 0-0-0 12.0-0-0 Bd6 13.Be5 Rhe8 14.h5 Qf7 15.c3 Nxe5 16.Nxe5 Bxe5 17.Qxe5 Qf6 18.f4 Qxe5 19.fxe5 Re7 20.Be2 Bc6 21.Bf3 Be8 22.Rdg1 c6 23.Rh2 Kc7 24.Kc2 Kb6 25.b4 Kc7 26.g4 fxg4 27.Rxg4 a5 28.a3 axb4 29.axb4 Ra8 30.Kd3 Rd8 31.Be4 b5 32.Ke3 Kb6 33.Rg3 Ra8 34.Rhg2 Ra3 35.Kd3 Bxh5 36.Rxg7 Rxg7 37.Rxg7 Ra2 38.Rd7 Be2+ 39.Ke3 Bc4 40.Rd6 Ra3 41.Rxc6+ Ka7 42.Kf4 Rxc3 43.d5 exd5 44.Bxd5 Rc1 45.Bxc4 bxc4 46.e6 c3 47.Ke3 Kb7 48.b5 Re1+ 49.Kd3 h5 50.Kxc3 h4 51.Rc4 Rxe6 52.Rxh4 Kb6 53.Kb4 Rg6 ½–½

=== Game 7: Lasker–Tarrasch, 1–0 ===
French, McCutcheon (ECO C12)
1.e4 e6 2.d4 d5 3.Nc3 Nf6 4.Bg5 Bb4 5.Bd3 dxe4 6.Bxe4 c5 7.dxc5 Bxc3+ 8.bxc3 Qa5 9.Bxf6 gxf6 10.Qd4 e5 11.Qe3 Qc7 12.Ne2 Nd7 13.Qf3 Ke7 14.c6 Nc5 15.cxb7 Bxb7 16.Bxb7 Qxb7 17.Qe3 Rac8 18.0-0 Qe4 19.Rab1 Rhd8 20.Ng3 Qxe3 21.fxe3 Rd2 22.Rf2 Rcd8 23.Rb5 Rd1+ 24.Rf1 Na4 25.Ne4 Nb6 26.Ra5 Nc8 27.Rc5 Nb6 28.Rc7+ Kf8 29.Nxf6 Rxf1+ 30.Kxf1 Kg7 31.Ng4 Rd5 32.Rxa7 h5 33.e4 Rc5 34.Ne3 Rxc3 35.Ke2 Nc4 36.Nf5+ Kh8 37.Rxf7 Rxc2+ 38.Kd3 Rc1 39.Ne3 Nxe3 40.Kxe3 Rc3+ 41.Kf2 Rc2+ 42.Kg3 h4 43.Kh3 Re2 44.Rf5 Rxe4 45.Rg5 Kh7 46.Rg4 Re3+ 47.Kxh4 Ra3 48.Kg5 Rxa2 49.Kf5 Re2 50.h3 Kh6 51.g3 Re3 52.h4 Kh7 53.Rg5 Re1 54.g4 Kh6 55.Kf6 Kh7 56.Rxe5 Rf1+ 57.Kg5 Rf7 58.h5 Ra7 59.Rb5 Rg7+ 60.Kf4 Ra7 61.g5 Kg7 62.Kf5 Rf7+ 63.Kg4 Ra7 64.h6+ Kg6 65.Rb6+ Kh7 66.Kh5 Ra5 67.Rb7+ Kg8 68.Re7 Rb5 69.Kg6 Rb6+ 70.Kf5 Rb5+ 71.Kf6 Rb8 72.g6 Ra8 73.Re5 Kh8 74.Kg5 Rg8 75.Rb5 Re8 76.h7 1–0

=== Game 8: Tarrasch–Lasker, ½–½ ===
Ruy Lopez (ECO C67)
1.e4 e5 2.Nf3 Nc6 3.Bb5 Nf6 4.0-0 Nxe4 5.d4 Be7 6.Qe2 Nd6 7.Bxc6 bxc6 8.dxe5 Nb7 9.Re1 0-0 10.Nc3 Nc5 11.Nd4 Ne6 12.Be3 Nxd4 13.Bxd4 c5 14.Be3 d5 15.exd6 Bxd6 16.Qh5 Bb7 17.Rad1 Re8 18.Nb5 Qf6 19.Nxd6 cxd6 20.Bc1 Re6 21.c3 Rae8 22.Re3 Re5 23.Rde1 h6 24.Qg4 R8e6 25.Rxe5 dxe5 26.f3 Qe7 27.Be3 Bd5 28.b3 c4 29.bxc4 Bc6 30.Rb1 Qc7 31.c5 Qd8 32.Qf5 e4 33.f4 Qd3 34.Re1 Qxc3 35.Kf2 Qc4 36.Qg4 Qxa2+ 37.Re2 Qc4 38.Rd2 Bb5 39.Qd1 Ra6 40.Rc2 Qe6 41.h3 Bd3 42.Rd2 f5 43.Kg3 Ra3 44.Kh2 a5 45.Qc1 Ra4 46.Qc3 Rb4 47.c6 Rc4 48.Qxa5 Rxc6 ½–½

=== Game 9: Lasker–Tarrasch, ½–½ ===
French, McCutcheon (ECO C12)
1.e4 e6 2.d4 d5 3.Nc3 Nf6 4.Bg5 Bb4 5.Bd3 dxe4 6.Bxe4 c5 7.dxc5 Nbd7 8. Bxf6 Nxf6 9. Bf3 Qxd1+ 10. Rxd1 Bxc5 11.Nge2 Ke7 12.0-0 Bd7 13.Nc1 Rab8 14.Nd3 Bd6 15.Rd2 Rhd8 16.Re1 Be8 17.Red1 b5 18.g3 b4 19.Ne2 Rbc8 20.Nd4 a5 21.Nb3 Bc7 22.Bb7 Rb8 23.Bg2 Bb6 24.Ne5 Rxd2 25.Rxd2 Rc8 26.Kf1 Bb5+ 27.Ke1 a4 28.Nc1 Nd7 29.Nxd7 Bxd7 30.Bf1 Ba5 31.b3 Bc6 32.Bc4 e5 33.Nd3 f6 34.Ke2 Be8 35.f3 Rd8 36.Nc5 Rxd2+ 37.Kxd2 axb3 38.Nxb3 Bb6 39.c3 bxc3 40.Kxc3 Bg1 41.h3 Bf2 42.g4 Be1+ 43.Kd3 Bc6 44.Ke3 Kd6 45.Bg8 h6 46.Bh7 Be8 47.Bd3 Bf7 48.Bb5 Bb4 49.Bd3 Ba3 50.Bb5 Kd5 51.Bd3 h5 52.Ke2 h4 53.Ke3 Bg8 54.Ke2 Kd6 55.Ke3 Bd5 56.Bg6 Ke7 57.Be4 Bc4 58.Bd3 Bf7 59.Ke2 Kf8 60.Be4 g6 61.Na1 Kg7 62.Nc2 Bc5 63.a4 Kh6 64.a5 Kg5 65.Ne1 f5 66.gxf5 gxf5 67.Bb7 Bc4+ 68.Nd3 Bb4 69.a6 e4 70.fxe4 fxe4 71.Bxe4 Bxa6 ½–½

=== Game 10: Tarrasch–Lasker, 1–0 ===
Ruy Lopez (ECO C67)
1.e4 e5 2.Nf3 Nc6 3.Bb5 Nf6 4.0-0 Nxe4 5.d4 Be7 6.Qe2 Nd6 7.Bxc6 bxc6 8.dxe5 Nb7 9.Nc3 0-0 10.Re1 Nc5 11.Nd4 Ne6 12.Be3 Nxd4 13.Bxd4 c5 14.Be3 d5 15.exd6 Bxd6 16.Ne4 Bb7 17.Nxd6 cxd6 18.c4 Qf6 19.Rad1 Rfe8 20.Qg4 Bc6 21.Re2 Re4 22.Qg3 Qe6 23.h3 Rd8 24.Red2 Re5 25.Bh6 Qg6 26.Bf4 Re6 27.Bxd6 Qh5 28.Qg4 Qxg4 29.hxg4 Re4 30.Bxc5 Rxd2 31.Rxd2 h5 32.Rd6 1–0

=== Game 11: Lasker–Tarrasch, 1–0 ===
French, McCutcheon (ECO C12)
1.e4 e6 2.d4 d5 3.Nc3 Nf6 4.Bg5 Bb4 5.exd5 Qxd5 6.Nf3 c5 7.Bxf6 gxf6 8.Qd2 Bxc3 9.Qxc3 Nd7 10.Rd1 Rg8 11.dxc5 Qxc5 12.Qd2 Qb6 13.c3 a6 14.Qc2 f5 15.g3 Nc5 16.Bg2 Qc7 17.Qe2 b5 18.0-0 Bb7 19.c4 b4 20.Qd2 Rb8 21.Qh6 Bxf3 22.Bxf3 Qe5 23.Rfe1 Qxb2 24.Qf4 Rc8 25.Qd6 f6 26.Bh5+ Rg6 27.Bxg6+ hxg6 28.Rxe6+ 1–0

=== Game 12: Tarrasch–Lasker, 1–0 ===
Four Knights (ECO C49)
1.e4 e5 2.Nf3 Nc6 3.Bb5 Nf6 4.Nc3 Bb4 5.0-0 d6 6.Nd5 Bc5 7.d4 exd4 8.Nxd4 Bxd4 9.Qxd4 0-0 10.Nxf6+ Qxf6 11.Qxf6 gxf6 12.Bh6 Re8 13.Rfe1 a6 14.Bf1 Kh8 15.Bd2 Ne7 16.Bc3 Ng8 17.f4 Kg7 18.Re3 Kf8 19.Bd3 Bd7 20.Rae1 Bb5 21.e5 Bxd3 22.Rxd3 fxe5 23.fxe5 dxe5 24.Rxe5 b6 25.Rh5 h6 26.Bd2 Re6 27.Rd7 Rc8 28.Rf5 Re7 29.Rxe7 Kxe7 30.Re5+ Kf6 31.Bc3 Kg6 32.Re3 Rd8 33.Rg3+ Kf5 34.Rg7 Ke6 35.Rh7 c5 36.Kf2 b5 37.Ke2 b4 38.Bd2 Rd4 39.g3 Rg4 40.Bxh6 Nf6 41.Rh8 Rc4 42.Kd1 Ng4 43.Bf4 Kf5 44.b3 Rc3 45.Bd2 Rf3 46.Rh5+ Ke4 47.Rh4 Kf5 48.h3 Nf6 49.Rf4+ Rxf4 50.Bxf4 Ke4 51.Ke2 c4 52.Bg5 Nd5 53.bxc4 Nc3+ 54.Kd2 Kf5 55.Bf4 Nxa2 56.c5 Ke6 57.c6 Nc3 58.Kd3 Nd5 59.Kc4 Ne7 60.Kc5 a5 61.c7 Kd7 62.Kb6 Nf5 63.Kxa5 Nd4 64.Kxb4 Nxc2+ 65.Kc4 1–0

=== Game 13: Lasker–Tarrasch, 1–0 ===
Queen's Gambit Declined, Tarrasch (ECO D32)
1.d4 d5 2.c4 e6 3.Nc3 c5 4.Nf3 Nc6 5.e3 Nf6 6.a3 Bd6 7.dxc5 Bxc5 8.b4 Bd6 9.Bb2 0-0 10.Rc1 a5 11.b5 Ne5 12.cxd5 exd5 13.Be2 Be6 14.0-0 Qe7 15.a4 Rac8 16.Nd4 Nc4 17.Ba1 Bb8 18.Re1 Qd6 19.g3 Rfd8 20.Nb1 Nb6 21.Bc3 Re8 22.Qb3 Nc4 23.Nxe6 Qxe6 24.Bxf6 gxf6 25.Red1 Ba7 26.Bf3 Nxe3 27.Rxc8 Qxc8 28.b6 Bxb6 29.fxe3 Rxe3 30.Qxb6 Rxf3+ 31.Qxa5 Qc4 32.Qd2 f5 33.Rc1 Qg4 34.Qxd5 f4 35.Nd2 Re3 36.Rf1 Re6 37.Rxf4 Qd1+ 38.Kg2 b6 39.Qd7 Qe2+ 40.Rf2 Qh5 41.Nf3 h6 42.Nd4 Re5 43.Qd8+ Kh7 44.Qf8 1–0

=== Game 14: Tarrasch–Lasker, ½–½ ===
This at the time held the record for longest game in World Championship history.

Ruy Lopez (ECO C67)
1.e4 e5 2.Nf3 Nc6 3.Bb5 Nf6 4.0-0 Nxe4 5.d4 Be7 6.Qe2 Nd6 7.Bxc6 bxc6 8.dxe5 Nb7 9.Re1 0-0 10.Nc3 Nc5 11.Nd4 Ne6 12.Be3 Nxd4 13.Bxd4 c5 14.Be3 d5 15.exd6 Bxd6 16.Rad1 Qh4 17.h3 Qb4 18.Bc1 Be6 19.a3 Qb7 20.Qe4 Qxe4 21.Nxe4 Rfd8 22.Be3 Bf5 23.Nxc5 Bxc2 24.Rd2 Bf5 25.Nb7 Rd7 26.Red1 Be6 27.Nxd6 cxd6 28.Rxd6 Rxd6 29.Rxd6 a5 30.b4 axb4 31.axb4 Kf8 32.b5 Ke7 33.Rd1 Rd8 34.Rb1 Bd5 35.Bg5+ f6 36.Bf4 Bb7 37.Re1+ Kd7 38.Rc1 Ke6 39.b6 Rd7 40.Re1+ Kd5 41.Re8 Kc6 42.Be3 Ba6 43.Ra8 Bd3 44.Rb8 Ba6 45.Kh2 Bd3 46.Bf4 Bg6 47.Be3 Bd3 48.g4 Bg6 49.Kg3 h5 50.f4 hxg4 51.hxg4 Re7 52.Rc8+ Kb7 53.Rc3 Be4 54.Ra3 Kc6 55.Rc3+ Kb7 56.Ra3 Kc6 57.Rc3+ Kb7 58.f5 g6 59.g5 Rf7 60.gxf6 Rxf6 61.Rc7+ Ka6 62.Ra7+ Kb5 63.b7 Bxb7 64.Rxb7+ Kc4 65.Kf4 gxf5 66.Ke5 Rf8 67.Rc7+ Kd3 68.Bc5 Rd8 69.Bb4 f4 70.Rc3+ Ke2 71.Ke4 Re8+ 72.Kxf4 Re6 73.Bc5 Kd2 74.Bd4 Rh6 75.Ke4 Re6+ 76.Kd5 Re7 77.Ra3 Re8 78.Be5 Rg8 79.Ke4 Rg4+ 80.Kd5 Rg8 81.Bd4 Re8 82.Rf3 Ke2 83.Rg3 Kd2 84.Be5 Rd8+ 85.Ke4 Kc2 86.Rc3+ Kd2 87.Rb3 Rc8 88.Rh3 Re8 89.Rh2+ Kc1 90.Kd4 Rd8+ 91.Kc3 Kd1 92.Bd4 Ke1 93.Kd3 Rf8 94.Rg2 Rf7 95.Be3 Rd7+ 96.Bd4 Rf7 97.Rg5 Rf8 98.Rb5 Kf1 99.Rb1+ Kg2 100.Rg1+ Kh3 101.Be3 Kh4 102.Ke4 Rf7 103.Bd4 Rf8 104.Bg7 Ra8 105.Bf6+ Kh3 106.Be5 Ra4+ 107.Kf5 Ra3 108.Bf4 Ra5+ 109.Ke4 Kh4 110.Bg3+ Kh5 111.Be5 Kh4 112.Kf5 Ra3 113.Rg2 Rb3 114.Ra2 Rf3+ 115.Bf4 Rb3 116.Rg2 Rb5+ 117.Ke4 Kh5 118. Be5 Kh4 119. Kf5 Rb3 ½–½

=== Game 15: Lasker–Tarrasch, ½–½ ===
Queen's Pawn Game (ECO D02)
1.d4 d5 2.Nf3 c5 3.dxc5 e6 4.e4 Bxc5 5.exd5 exd5 6.Bb5+ Nc6 7.0-0 Nf6 8.Nc3 0-0 9.Bg5 Be7 10.Bxf6 Bxf6 11.Qxd5 Bxc3 12.Qxd8 Rxd8 13.bxc3 Na5 14.Rfe1 Bd7 15.Bd3 Re8 16.Nd4 Kf8 17.Nb3 b6 18.Nxa5 bxa5 19.Kf1 Rac8 20.c4 Be6 21.Re5 Bxc4 22.Rxa5 Bxd3+ 23.cxd3 Rc3 24.Rxa7 Rxd3 25.Re1 Rd2 26.Rxe8+ Kxe8 27.Ke1 Rb2 28.a4 g6 29.a5 Ra2 30.a6 Kf8 31.Ra8+ Kg7 32.g4 Kf6 33.h4 h5 34.gxh5 gxh5 35.a7 Kg7 36.Kd1 Kh7 37.Kc1 Kg7 38.Kb1 Ra5 39.Kc2 Ra2+ 40.Kc3 Ra3+ 41.Kc4 Ra4+ 42.Kb5 Ra1 43.f4 Rb1+ 44.Kc5 Ra1 45.Kd6 Kf6 46.Kd7 Kf5 47.Kc6 Kxf4 48.Kb6 Rb1+ 49.Kc5 Rc1+ 50.Kb5 Rb1+ 51.Kc6 Rc1+ 52.Kb6 ½–½

=== Game 16: Tarrasch–Lasker, 0–1 ===
Lasker–Tarrasch, game 1

Position: e8 black rook, h8 black king, a7 black pawn, g7 black pawn, d6 black pawn, h6 black pawn, b5 black pawn, c5 black bishop, d4 white knight, b3 white bishop, g3 white knight, a2 white pawn, b2 white pawn, c2 white pawn, f2 black rook, h2 white pawn, d1 white rook, h1 white king

Position after 26.Nd4??. The game-ending blunder. After 26...Bxd4, White cannot recapture the bishop, as the rook would leave the defence of the back rank, leading to 27...Re1+ 28.Nf1 Rxf1#.

The shortest game of the match. Lasker made a pseudo sacrifice with 11...Bc5. The game and the match ended with 26.Nd4?? Bxd4, with Tarrasch missing a ladder mate tactic.

Four Knights (ECO C49)
1.e4 e5 2.Nf3 Nc6 3.Bb5 Nf6 4.Nc3 Bb4 5.0-0 0-0 6.d3 d6 7.Bg5 Be6 8.d4 exd4 9.Nxd4 h6 10.Bh4 Ne5 11.f4 Bc5 12.Bxf6 Qxf6 13.fxe5 Qxe5 14.Ne2 Bg4 15.Rf3 Bxf3 16.gxf3 f5 17.Qd3 c6 18.Bc4+ Kh8 19.Kh1 b5 20.Bb3 fxe4 21.Qxe4 Qxe4 22.fxe4 Rae8 23.Nxc6 Rxe4 24.Ng3 Ree8 25.Rd1 Rf2 26.Nd4 Bxd4 0–1

== Aftermath ==
Though after the fact many attributed Tarrasch's loss to being past his prime, he himself felt that the match's score gave a faulty impression of his level of inferiority in skill to Lasker. He wrote in his book about the match:

If one does not just look at the result but plays through the games one will have to admit that on many occasions I have played much better, that my strength in the second half of the match was much greater than in the beginning, and that it was not the greater strength of the opponent which defeated me, but that I, particularly in the beginning, much too often missed the win and practically threw the games to my opponent. I am the first to wholeheartedly acknowledge the superior strength of an opponent. But this has to be strength which overcomes the opponent! But I noticed such a strength in only very few games, namely in the fifth and the eleventh game. In fact, in a lot of the other games a second-rate player could have led the game to a successful end in my stead after I had managed to create a winning position.

— Siegbert Tarrasch, Der Schachwettkampf Lasker – Tarrasch um die Weltmeisterschaft im August – September 1908

At the time, he also based his play on lack of practice" and the "maritime climate" in Düsseldorf. Lasker would go on to win the world championship two more times, while Tarrasch was apparently past his peak.
