= Arved Heinrichsen =

Lithuanian chess player

Arved Heinrichsen (Arvydas Hainričsenas, 23 November 1876, in Vilnius – 23 August 1900, in Vilnius), was a Lithuanian chess master.

Born into a German family in Vilnius (Lithuania, then Russian Empire), he entered a gymnasium secondary school in Riga. After a short stay in St Petersburg, he left in 1896 for Berlin to study there at the faculty of medicine. In the summer semester of 1898 he continued in his studies at the university in Kiel, but in late summer he began to suffer from health problems. In September 1898 his Berlin doctor diagnosed the beginning of tuberculosis. The parents sent him, at the doctor's recommendation, to Helouan in Egypt but there he contracted malaria, which undermined his physical strength still more. He spent the rest of his life in his native town Vilnius, and died in the summer of 1900 in the circle of his family.

His very short chess career took place in Germany in 1896–1898. He tied for 4-5th at Eisenach 1896(the 10th DSB Congress, Robert Henry Barnes won), took 6th at Berlin 1897 (Meisterturnier des Schachverein Centrum, Curt von Bardeleben won), took 3rd, behind Ignatz von Popiel and Dirk Beijkmans, at Berlin 1897 (Der 70.Jahrestag der Berliner Schachgesellschaft, Hauptturnier A), shared 1st at Elmshorn 1898 (quadrangular), and tied for 13-14th at Cologne 1898 (the 11th DSB Congress, Amos Burn won).

His name is attached to the Heinrichsen Opening (also known as Baltic, Dunst, Sleipner, Kotrc, and Queen's Knight Opening) 1. Nc3.
