= James Mortimer (chess player) =

American chess player (1833–1911)

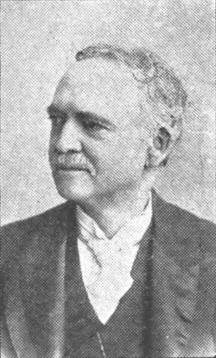
James Mortimer

James Henry Gerard Mortimer (22 April 1832 – 24 February 1911) was an American-born British chess player, journalist, and playwright.

== Life ==
Born in Richmond, Virginia, Mortimer graduated from the University of Virginia. As an attaché in the U.S. Diplomatic Service he was stationed in Paris from 1855 to 1860. Emperor Napoleon III awarded him the Cross of the Legion of Honour for his work. When American chess champion Paul Morphy traveled to Paris in 1858, Mortimer met him and they became friends. Mortimer was one of the few who witnessed the famous 1858 Morphy match with Adolf Anderssen.

His loyalty to the Southern Confederacy led him to quit federal service in 1860. Mortimer remained in Paris working as a journalist. When Napoleon III was deposed in 1870, they both settled in England.

In London, Mortimer founded The London Figaro, the official newspaper of Napoleon's government in exile. Although Napoleon died in 1873, Figaro continued as a magazine. It was often controversial, and Mortimer made many enemies with his scathing theatre reviews. When caught up in a libel case, Mortimer unwisely chose to defend himself. Acting as his own counsel, he was unable to testify in his own defense. After he was convicted by the jury Mortimer was able to produce evidence to the judges that he had no personal knowledge of the libelous article, but it was too late. Rather than imposing the more common penalty of a fine, the court sentenced him to three months prison. Mortimer's public stature grew as a result as the punishment was widely felt to be unfair. Mortimer's imprisonment eventually caused him to sell Figaro, and with the sale came the end of its excellent chess column which had been written by chess master Johann Löwenthal from 1872 to 1876 and World Chess Champion Wilhelm Steinitz from 1876 to 1882. When Mortimer was released, he continued his career as a critic and a playwright. He wrote over 30 plays produced in London. Covering Spain's first international chess tournament, San Sebastián 1911, he caught pneumonia and died.

== Chess career ==
Mortimer had a very poor record in chess tournaments, nearly always finishing near the bottom of the field. At London 1883, he finished tied for last in a field of fourteen players, finishing with a score of just 3 out of 26. Despite his poor finishes, he was invited to many tournaments and seemed to be regarded more highly as a chess personality than a chess player.

Although never successful in tournaments, Mortimer sometimes did play well in individual games against powerful opponents. At London 1883, he beat Johannes Zukertort and Mikhail Chigorin, but finished tied for last in a field of 14 with a score of 3–23. At the BCA International Congress in London in 1886 he defeated Jean Taubenhaus, James Mason, William H. K. Pollock, and Emil Schallopp, but finished with a score of 4–8 and in 11th place of 13. When he was 74 he played the 1907 Masters Tournament at Ostend and defeated Savielly Tartakower, Eugene Znosko-Borovsky, and Joseph Henry Blackburne, but finished last of 29 with a score of 5–23. He also won tournament games against Henry Bird and Jacques Mieses, and drew with Wilhelm Steinitz and George Henry Mackenzie.

Mortimer wrote two best-selling chess books published in London. He is the eponym of the Mortimer Defence in the Ruy Lopez and the related Mortimer Trap, and the Mortimer-Frazier Attack in the Evans Gambit.

=== Results in tournaments ===
- London 1883: 3-23, =13-14th out of 14 players
- London 1885: 6-9, =10-11th of 12
- London 1886: 4-8, 11th of 13
- London 1887: 0-9, last of 10
- Bradford 1888: 5½-10½, 13th of 17
- London 1889: 3-7, 10th of 11
- Manchester 1890: 8½-10½, 14th of 20
- London 1891 (Simpson's Divan summer tourney): 5½-3½, 4th of 10
- London 1891 (Simpson's Divan winter tourney): 4-5, =6-9th of 10
- London 1892 (7th BCA tourney): 3½-7½, 10th of 12
- London 1896: 4-7, =8-11th of 12
- London 1900 (Simpson's Divan): ½-3½, last of 5
- Paris 1900: 2-14, 15th of 17
- Folkestone 1901: 2-3, =3rd-5th out of 6
- Monte Carlo 1902: 1-18, last of 20
- Norwich 1902: 2½-8½, =10-11th of 12
- Tunbridge Wells 1902: 4-5, 7th of 10
- Canterbury 1903: 4-4, 5th of 9
- Plymouth 1903 (section II): 4½-3½, =3rd-4th of 9
- Brighton 1904: 5-3, 4th of 9
- London 1904: 4-12, last of 17
- London 1904 Rice Gambit: 2½-13½, last of 9
- Ostend 1907 (master tourney): 5-23, last of 29
- London 1907-8 (City of London Ch): 10-9, =8-10th of 20
- London 1909-10 (City of London Ch): 6-11, 15th of 18
- Paris 1910: 2½-13½, 16th of 17
- London 1910-11 (City of London Ch): 2½-13½, 16th of 17
