= Johan Barendregt =

Dutch chess player (1924–1982)

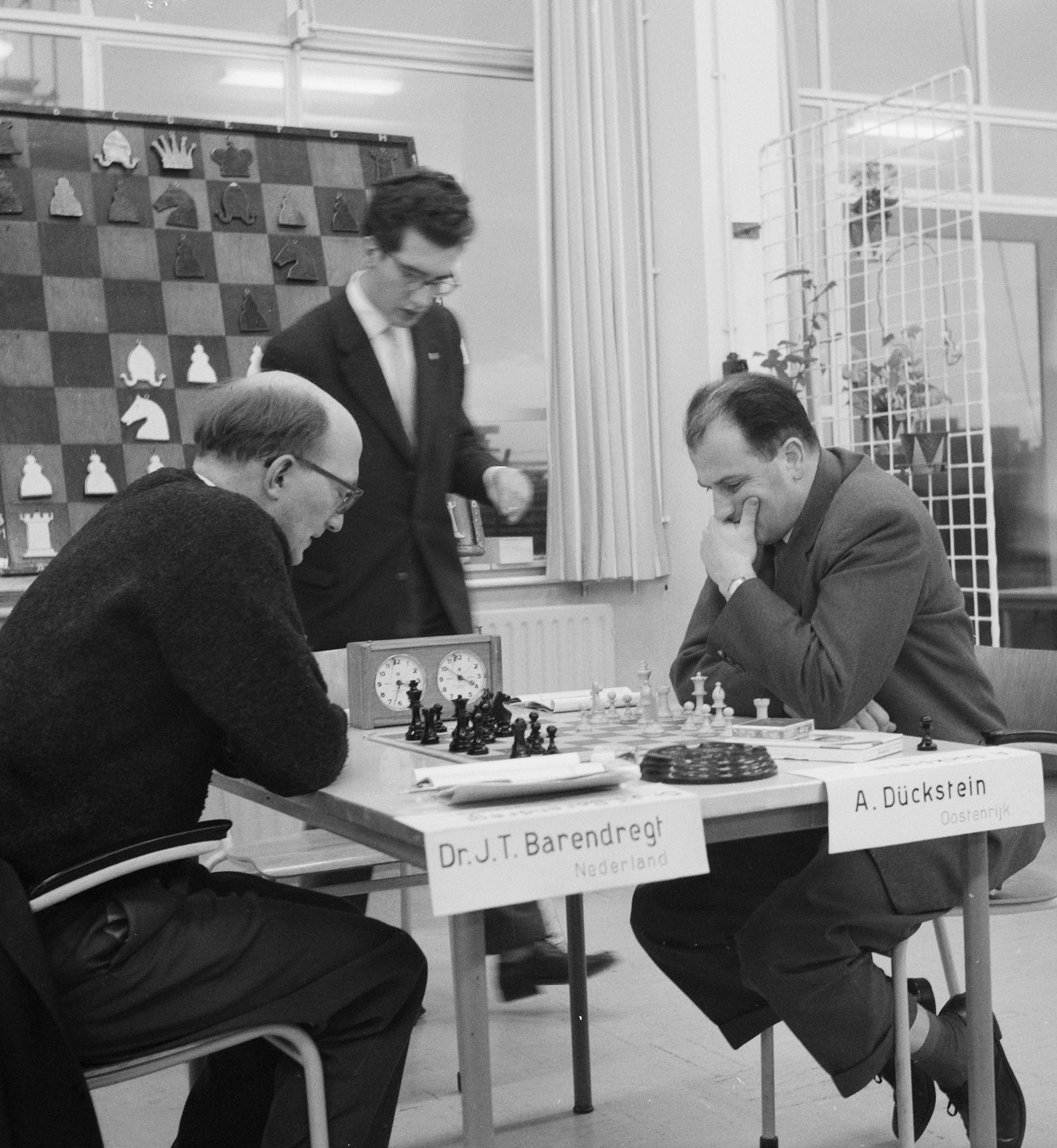
- Johan Barendregt (left) in 1960

Personal information
- Born: 16 February 1924 Nieuwerkerk, Netherlands
- Died: 2 January 1982 (aged 57) Amsterdam, Netherlands

Chess career
- Country: Netherlands
- Title: International Master (1962)
- Peak rating: 2330 (July 1971)

Johan Teunis Barendregt (16 February 1924 – 2 January 1982) was a Dutch psychologist and chess International Master (IM) (1962).

== Psychologist ==
Barendregt studied psychology at the University of Amsterdam with Adriaan de Groot and investigated the effectiveness of psychoanalysis, among other things. He had the ambition to force psychology in the direction of natural science and, according to his contemporaries, delivered a methodologically exemplary dissertation, covering only 53 pages.

From 1962 he was a professor at the University of Amsterdam. His model for the development of a phobia was published posthumously. Barendregt argued that a phobia arises from what he called "it", an acute attack of depersonalization, in which the phobia has a survival function; the "foothold is found in fear, which is preferable to emptiness."

In retrospect by Jaap van Heerden, Barendregt is called 'a walking paradox', because he became the personification of the method struggle that was going on at the time between the hermeneutics of psychoanalysts and psychotherapists, and the methodological approach of experimental psychologists and psychometricians. He blamed the first group for not being able to test their findings. However, according to Barendregt, the methodologists paid too little attention to the individual.

== Chess career ==
Barendregt became obsessed with chess at the age of 13 and proved in 1937 that a chess problem in The Chess World was incorrect. He played at The Gijón International Chess tournament in 1955. He four time played in the Dutch Chess Championship. In 1961 he finished third in the Blast Furnace chess tournament, behind Bruno Parma and Francesco Scafarelli. He was awarded the title of FIDE International Master (IM) in 1962. In 1966, he defeated Mikhail Botvinnik at the IBM international chess tournament. He is mentioned in My 60 Memorable Games (1969) by Bobby Fischer in connection with the Ruy Lopez Exchange Variation, a line in which he made important theoretical contributions.

Johan Barendregt played for Netherlands in the Chess Olympiad:

- In 1952, at second reserve board in the 10th Chess Olympiad in Helsinki (+2, =2, -1).

Johan Barendregt played for Netherlands in the European Team Chess Championship:

- In 1965, at fifth board in the 3rd European Team Chess Championship in Hamburg (+0, =7, -3).

Johan Barendregt played for Netherlands in the World Student Team Chess Championships:

- In 1960, at first board in the 7th World Student Team Chess Championship in Leningrad (+4, =2, -7),
- In 1961, at first board in the 8th World Student Team Chess Championship in Helsinki (+3, =1, -8),
- In 1962, at first board in the 9th World Student Team Chess Championship in Mariánské Lázně (+6, =2, -4),
- In 1963, at first board in the 10th World Student Team Chess Championship in Budva (+5, =6, -1).

Johan Barendregt played for Netherlands in the Clare Benedict Chess Cups:

- In 1961, at fourth board in the 8th Clare Benedict Chess Cup in Neuhausen (+1, =2, -0) and won the team silver medal,
- In 1964, at reserve board in the 9th Clare Benedict Chess Cup in Lenzerheide (+1, =2, -1).

== Private life ==
Barendregt died of lung cancer a month and a half before his 58th birthday. His son Henk Barendregt (1947) is a professor of mathematics and computer science.
