= Ruy Lopez, Exchange Variation =

Chess opening

Exchange Variation
Position: a8 black rook, c8 black bishop, d8 black queen, e8 black king, f8 black bishop, g8 black knight, h8 black rook, b7 black pawn, c7 black pawn, d7 black pawn, f7 black pawn, g7 black pawn, h7 black pawn, a6 black pawn, c6 white bishop, e5 black pawn, e4 white pawn, f3 white knight, a2 white pawn, b2 white pawn, c2 white pawn, d2 white pawn, f2 white pawn, g2 white pawn, h2 white pawn, a1 white rook, b1 white knight, c1 white bishop, d1 white queen, e1 white king, h1 white rook
- Moves: 1.e4 e5 2.Nf3 Nc6 3.Bb5 a6 4.Bxc6
- ECO: C68–C69
- Named after: Ruy López de Segura, Libro del Ajedrez, 1561
- Parent: Ruy Lopez
- Synonyms: Spanish Opening, Exchange Variation

The Exchange Variation of the Ruy Lopez is a chess opening that begins with the moves:

1. e4 e5
2. Nf3 Nc6
3. Bb5 a6
4. Bxc6

Black may recapture on c6 with either pawn; although 4...bxc6 is playable, 4...dxc6 is almost always chosen at master level. Black has gained the bishop pair at the cost of a weakened pawn structure, having doubled pawns on c6 and c7. White aims to reach an endgame with a superior pawn structure, which may become an important factor. Thus, Black is compelled to strive for an active position, generally avoiding piece exchanges. The variation was introduced into grandmaster play by Emanuel Lasker, and later invigorated with new ideas by Bobby Fischer.

The Exchange Variation can be a powerful psychological weapon. Black is forced to play actively, which is psychologically difficult if all one needs is a draw. Lasker's famous win against Jose Raul Capablanca in the St. Petersburg 1914 chess tournament is an example of this. With a lead in the tournament, Capablanca was intent on simplifying the game to obtain a draw, but faced with the Exchange Ruy Lopez he played too passively and was routed by Lasker as a result.

== Main line: 4...dxc6 ==
4...dxc6 is the main recapture. Black's structure is weakened, but has free diagonals for both bishops. White cannot win a pawn with 5.Nxe5? as 5...Qd4! forks White's knight and pawn, thus regaining the material, leading to positions where White has forfeited any structural advantage, which was the compensation for ceding the two bishops.

=== 5.0-0 ===
After 4...dxc6, the most popular move for White is 5.0-0. This is sometimes called the Barendregt Variation, a name proposed by Robert Byrne in a 1966 article for Chess Life, after the Dutch master Johan Barendregt who played it in the early 1960s. Barendregt made considerable contributions to the theory, although the variation is much older than this. White now threatens 6.Nxe5 because the sequence 6...Qd4 7.Nf3 Qxe4 to regain the pawn, now fails to 8.Re1 pinning and winning the queen. Black has several possible responses: 5...f6, 5...Bg4, 5...Qd6, or 5...Bd6 (all directly defending the e5-pawn, except 5...Bg4 which indirectly defends by pinning the knight). The moves 5...Be6, 5...Be7, and 5...Ne7 are less common moves which have never achieved popularity. The idea behind these moves is that if White plays to win a pawn with 6.Nxe5, 6...Qd4 7.Nf3 Qxe4 is again playable, as the Black minor piece on e6 or e7 blocks the e-file.

After Black defends the e5-pawn, White's main idea is to play d2–d4, opening lines and freeing pieces. Because the pawn-only endgame favours White, White is usually happy if this move leads to mass exchanges on the d-file.

==== 5...f6 ====
A move that was popular amongst masters during Bobby Fischer's reign and is still popular today. White's most active and modern approach to this defense is 6.d4, after which Black has two options: 6...Bg4 and 6...exd4. The move 6...Bg4 can be met also by two options: 7.dxe5 and 7.c3. On 7.dxe5 Qxd1 8.Rxd1 fxe5, White cannot take the e5-pawn with the knight because the knight is pinned by the bishop. Multiple trades have occurred, however, bringing the position closer to an endgame, which is beneficial for White, who has the better pawn structure.

The second move against 5...f6 6.d4 is 6...exd4. White can play 7.Qxd4 (Fischer chose the more obscure 7.Nxd4 in two Exchange Variation games in his 1992 match with Boris Spassky), offering a trade of queens that Black should take to avoid a worse position. After 7...Qxd4 8.Nxd4 c5 9.Nb3 (9.Ne2 is another line; however, Fischer often preferred 9.Nb3) White will develop freely with Be3 and Nc3 or Nbd2 depending on the position, and bringing one of the rooks to d1, usually the rook on f1.

==== 5...Bg4 ====
The most aggressive reply to 5.0-0 is 5...Bg4. After 6.h3, Black has possibilities such as 6...Bh5 or 6...Bxf3, but the most modern and active variation is 6...h5. White cannot take the bishop with 7.hxg4 because Black plays 7...hxg4, attacking the knight. If the knight moves, 8...Qh4 threatens checkmate with 9...Qh2# or 9...Qh1#. After 8...Qh4, if White tries 9.f3, trying to escape via f2 after a queen check, Black replies 9...g3 with inevitable mate.

After 6...h5, the most common continuation is 7.d3 Qf6 8.Nbd2 Ne7 (8...g5 9.Nc4 Bxf3 10.Qxf3 Qxf3 11.gxf3 f6 is fine for black too) 9.Re1 Ng6. Now a typical mistake is: 10.hxg4?!. After 10...hxg4, 11.g3 offering back the piece (White should not try to hold onto the knight, as it would be similar to the position after 7.hxg4?? hxg4). After 11.g3 gxf3?! 12.Qxf3, White is safe and has the superior pawn structure, which is considered to offer a small advantage in the ensuing queenless middlegame. However, after 11.g3 Black can play 11...Bc5!, and after 12.Nb3? comes 12...gxf3 13.Nxc5 Rh3!−+, while after 12.Kg2 0-0-0 13.Qe2 also comes 13...Rh3!.

An interesting alternative to 9.Re1 is 9.Nc4!?. If Black continues as usual with 9...Ng6?, then White can capture the bishop with 10.hxg4 hxg4 11.Bg5! +−. Therefore, Black usually captures on f3 with 9...Bxf3 10.Qxf3 Qxf3 11.gxf3. The resulting queenless middlegame scores slightly better for White. This line was played by Igor Glek three times, scoring 2½ out of 3.

==== 5...Qd6 ====
This is often called the Bronstein Variation. White's popular choices are 6.Na3 and 6.d3. After 6.d4 exd4 7.Nxd4, this move permits 7...Bd7 followed by ...0-0-0. Other ways for White to proceed include 6.a4 or 6.c3. This line is a favourite of Oleg Romanishin, who employed it successfully on multiple occasions.

==== 5...Bd6 ====
The other main reply to 5.0-0 is 5...Bd6. White again goes 6.d4, where Black can play either 6...exd4 or 6...Bg4.

The move 6...exd4 is not the best move. White recaptures the pawn with 7.Qxd4 and stands clearly better. An example of a massacre where Black is on the losing side is as follows: 7...f6 8.Nc3 (Note: ECO 2nd edition considers 8.b3, 8.c4, 8.Be3, 8.Nbd2, 8.Rd1, 8.Re1, and 8.e5, with all lines leading to balanced positions.) Bg4? 9.e5! attacking the g4-bishop with the queen and the d6-bishop with the pawn. After 9...Bxf3 10.exd6, Black cannot capture the pawn because the f3-bishop is hanging, and after 10...Bh5 11.Re1+ Kf8 12.Qc5, attacking the bishop on h5 while threatening dxc7 discovered check, winning the queen, White has a winning advantage.

The move 6...Bg4 is the better move in this line. White has a couple of possible moves, but the best line is 7.dxe5 Bxf3 8.Qxf3 Bxe5. Numerous trades have occurred, so White is satisfied. After 9.Nd2 Ne7 10.Nc4 Ng6 11.Nxe5 Nxe5 12.Qg3 (Salazar–Smith, Groningen 1976/77), White had the upper hand (Gipslis).

=== 5.d4 ===
5.d4 was used by Lasker in his famous win over Capablanca, but is less popular today than 5.0-0. The main line is considered to be 5.d4 exd4 6.Qxd4 Qxd4 7.Nxd4 Bd7 (rather than Capablanca's 7...Bd6) 8.Be3 0-0-0 with an approximately equal position.

=== Other 5th moves for White ===
White has also tried 5.Nc3, 5.b3, 5.d3, and 5.c3.

=== Endgame ===
Max Euwe, 1940

Position: e8 black king, b7 black pawn, c7 black pawn, f7 black pawn, g7 black pawn, h7 black pawn, a6 black pawn, c6 black pawn, e4 white pawn, a2 white pawn, b2 white pawn, c2 white pawn, f2 white pawn, g2 white pawn, h2 white pawn, e1 white king

White wins with either side to move.

If White can exchange all pieces, the pawn structure is a big advantage in the endgame. Max Euwe gave the pure pawn ending (without pieces—see diagram) resulting after the exchange of White's d-pawn for Black's e-pawn as a win for White. The winning procedure is detailed in Secrets of Pawn Endings. In essence, the winning plan is to create a passed pawn on the kingside, while Black is unable to do the same on the queenside because of the doubled pawns. The passed pawn ties down the black king and allows the white king to transfer to the queenside at an opportune moment, forcing a pawn through to promotion.

== 4...bxc6 ==
This recapture is much less popular than 4...dxc6. Black gains the half-open b-file, but the central pawn structure becomes awkward. The queen bishop has a particularly hard time finding a square, since moving the d-pawn leaves the c6-pawn undefended. If 5.Nxe5, Black regains the pawn with 5...Qg5 6.Nf3 Qxg2 7.Rg1 Qh3; White has lost the right to castle kingside but has a lead in development. Fischer wrote that White has an enduring initiative after 5.d4 exd4 6.Qxd4 Qf6 7.Qd3.

== ECO codes ==
There are two Encyclopaedia of Chess Openings classifications for the Exchange Variation.

- C68 covers 4...bxc6 and 4...dxc6, with White's response of 5.d4 or 5.Nc3 to either capture.
- C69 treats the variations arising from the continuation 4...dxc6 5.0-0 f6.
