= Josef Noa =

Hungarian chess player (1856–1903)

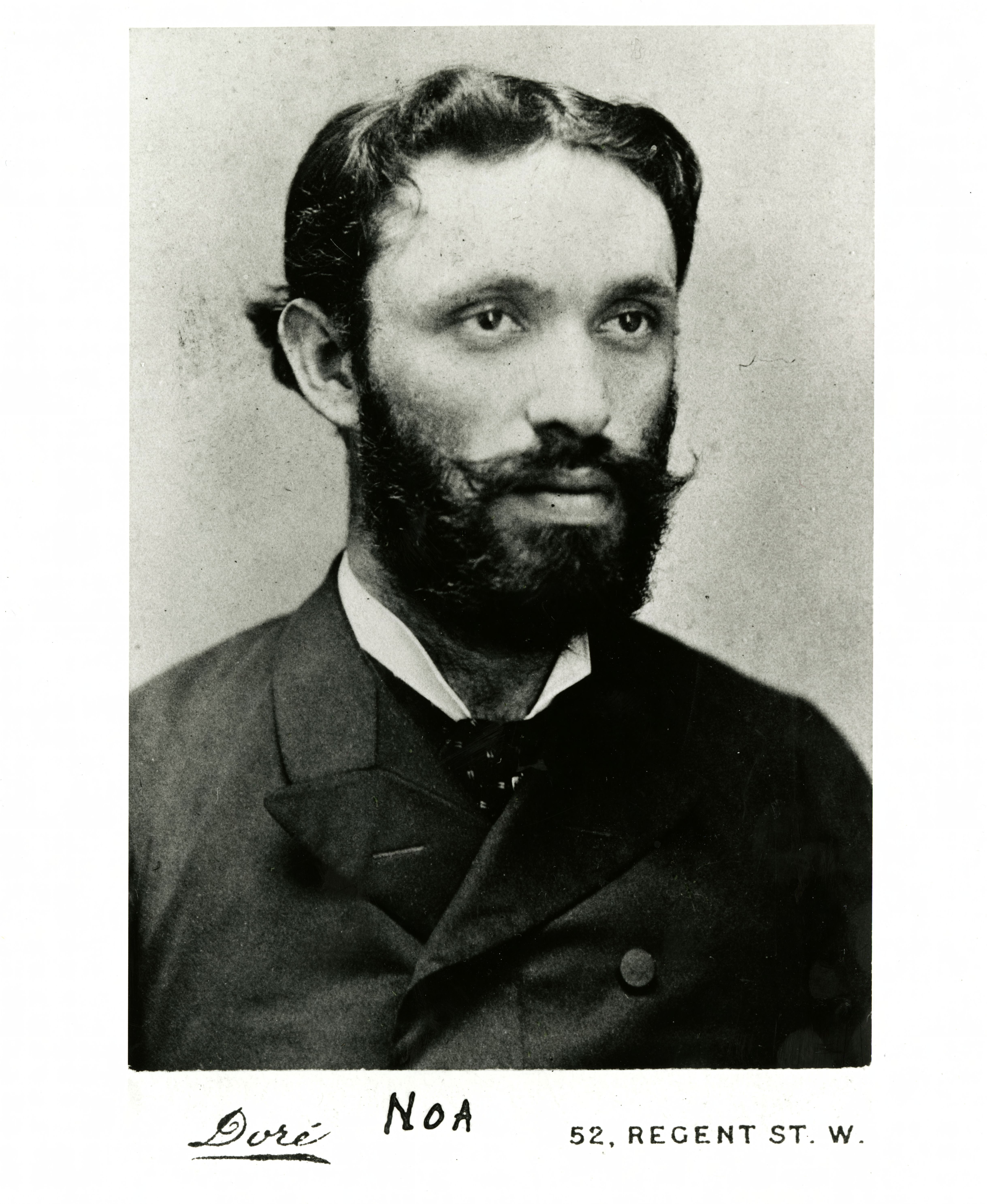
Jozsef Noa

Joseph Noa (Hungarian: Noa József; 21 October 1856 – 1 June 1903) was a Hungarian chess master.

Born in Nagybecskerek, he was a judge by profession. Although an amateur he played in a number of tournaments throughout the 1880s and 1890s and defeated some of the famous players of his time. In 1880, he took 8th in Graz (Adolf Schwarz, Miksa Weiss and Johannes von Minckwitz won). In 1881, he took 15th in Berlin (2nd DSB Congress; Joseph Henry Blackburne won). In 1882, he took 17th in Vienna (Wilhelm Steinitz and Szymon Winawer won). In 1883, he took 11th in London (Johannes Zukertort won). In 1885, he took 15th in Hamburg (4th DSB Congress; Isidor Gunsberg won). In 1887, he took 13th in Hamburg (5th DSB Congress; George Henry Mackenzie won). In 1892, he tied for 14-15th in Dresden (7th DSB Congress; Siegbert Tarrasch won). In 1896, he took 12th in Budapest (Mikhail Chigorin and Rudolf Charousek won). He died in Budapest in 1903.

A variation of the Nimzo-Indian Defence, 4. Qc2 d5, is often referred to as the Noa variation. However, there are no known games of Josef Noa or any other Noa playing this variation.
