= Interregnum =

Period of social discontinuity

An interregnum (plural interregna or interregnums) is a period of discontinuity or "gap" in a government, organization, or social order. Archetypally, it was the period of time between the reign of one monarch and the next (coming from Latin inter-, "between" and rēgnum, "reign" [from rex, rēgis, "king"]), and the concepts of interregnum and regency therefore overlap. Historically, longer interregna have been typically accompanied by widespread unrest, civil and succession wars between warlords, and power vacuums filled by foreign invasions or the emergence of a new power.

The term also refers to the periods between the election of a new parliament and the establishment of a new government from that parliament in parliamentary democracies, usually ones that employ some form of proportional representation that allows small parties to elect significant numbers, requiring time for negotiations to form a government. In the United Kingdom, Canada and other electoral systems with single-member districts, this period is usually very brief, except in the rare occurrence of a hung parliament as occurred both in the UK in 2017 and in Australia in 2010. In parliamentary interregnums, the previous government usually stands as a caretaker government until the new government is established. Additionally, the term has been applied to the United States presidential transition, the period of time between the election of a new U.S. president and their inauguration, during which the outgoing president remains in power, but as a lame duck.

Similarly, in some Christian denominations, "interregnum" (interim) describes the time between vacancy and appointment of priest or pastors to various roles.

== Historical periods of interregnum ==
Particular historical periods known as interregna include:

- The Chu–Han Contention of 206–202 BC in China, after the death of Emperor Qin Er Shi, when there was a contest for the throne. It ended with the accession of Liu Bang, ushering in the Han dynasty and ending the Qin dynasty.
- In the Kingdom of Mauretania, after the death of Bocchus II, the throne was unoccupied for 8 years (33–25 BC), before Juba II was granted control of the kingdom as a client state of Rome.
- The Crisis of the Third Century (235–284) in the Roman Empire, when it was split into multiple realms and chaos (invasion, civil war, Cyprian Plague, and economic depression) was a constant threat until Aurelian and Diocletian restored the empire. The crisis forced Diocletian to partition the Empire and marked the beginning of the fall of the Western Roman Empire.
- From 423 to 425 in the Roman Empire, between the death of Honorius and the accession of Valentinian III. A usurper called Joannes seized power.
- The ten years after the death of King Cleph from 574/575 to 584/585 in the Kingdom of the Lombards, known as the Rule of the Dukes. Marked by increasing domination of the Italian Peninsula by the Franks and the Byzantine Empire. Ended with the election of Authari as king.
- The Sasanian Interregnum (628–632), a conflict that broke out after the death of Khosrau II between the Sasanian nobles of different factions. Ended with the victory of Yazdegerd III and contributed to the fall of the Sasanian Empire.
- The 1022–1072 period in Ireland, between the death of Máel Sechnaill mac Domnaill and the accession of Toirdhealbhach Ua Briain, is sometimes regarded as an interregnum, as the High Kingship of Ireland was disputed throughout these decades. The interregnum may even have extended to 1121, when Toirdhealbhach Ua Conchobhair acceded to the title.
- From 1089 to 1102 in the Kingdom of Croatia, between the death of Croatian king Demetrius Zvonimir and the coronation of Coloman, king of Hungary as king of Croatia in 1102.
- From 13 April 1204 to 25 July 1261 in the Byzantine Empire. Following the Sack of Constantinople during the Fourth Crusade, the Byzantine Empire was dissolved, to be replaced by several Crusader states and several Byzantine states. It was re-established by Nicean general Alexios Strategopoulos who placed Michael VIII Palaiologos back on the throne of a united Byzantine Empire.
- From 21 May 1254 to 29 September 1273, The Great Interregnum in the Holy Roman Empire after the deposition of the last Hohenstaufen emperor Frederick II by Pope Innocent IV and the death of his son King Conrad IV of Germany until the election of the Habsburg scion Rudolph as Rex Romanorum.
- First Interregnum in Scotland, which lasted from either 19 March 1286 or 26 September 1290 until 17 November 1292. The exact dating of the interregnum depends on whether the uncrowned Margaret, Maid of Norway was officially queen before her death in 1290. It lasted until John Balliol was crowned King of Scots.
- Second Interregnum in Scotland, from 10 July 1296, when John Balliol was deposed, until 25 March 1306, when Robert the Bruce was crowned.
- From 14 January 1301 until 1308 in the Kingdom of Hungary between the extinction of the Árpád dynasty and when Charles I of Hungary secured the throne for himself against several pretenders.
- From 5 June 1316 to 15 November 1316 in France and Navarre, between the death of Louis X and the birth of his posthumous son John I.
- From 2 August 1332 until 21 June 1340 in Denmark, when the country was mortgaged to a few German counts.
- The Portuguese Interregnum, from 22 October 1383 until 6 April 1385, was a result of the succession crisis caused by the death of Ferdinand I without a legitimate heir. Ended when John I's forces won the Battle of Aljubarrota, beginning the Aviz dynasty.
- The Ottoman Interregnum, from 20 July 1402 until 1413, was a result of the capture of Sultan Bayezid I at the hands of Central Asian warlord Timur (Tamerlane) in the Battle of Ankara. A period of civil war ensued as none of Bayezid's sons could establish primacy. The crisis was resolved when one of his sons, Mehmed, defeated and killed his brothers and reestablished the Empire.
- From 20 January 1410 to 1412 in the Crown of Aragon. The death of King Martin without heir led to a succession crisis and a period of civil war, resolved ultimately by the Compromise of Caspe.
- The 1453–1456 period of civil war in Kingdom of Majapahit (now in Java, Indonesia)
- From 1481 until 1483 in the Kingdom of Norway, during a conflict over the succession of John, during the period of the Kalmar Union. The Norwegian Council of the Realm initially refused to accept the hereditary succession of John, as they asserted that Norway was an elective monarchy. When no serious opposition candidate emerged, the Council relented and elected John. There was also an interregnum from 1533 to 1537, after the death of Frederick I and the interregnum ended with a coup d'état by his son Christian III.
- From 6 April 1490 to 15 July 1490 in the Kingdom of Hungary between the death of Matthias Corvinus and election of Vladislaus II.
- The Time of Troubles in Russia (1598–1613) between the Rurikid and Romanov dynasties, which caused a famine and an invasion by Poland-Lithuania as numerous usurpers and false Dmitrys claimed to be the legitimate successor to the dead Fyodor I. Ended when the Zemsky Sobor elected Michael Romanov as the new tsar, beginning the Romanov dynasty.
- The Interregnum of 1649–1660, a republican period in the three kingdoms of England, Ireland and Scotland. Government was carried out by the Commonwealth and the Protectorate of Oliver Cromwell after the execution of Charles I and before the restoration of Charles II.
- A second English interregnum occurred between 23 December 1688, when James II was deposed in the Glorious Revolution, and the installation of William III and Mary II as joint sovereigns on 13 February 1689 pursuant to the Declaration of Right.
- French and British interregnum in the Dutch East Indies between 1806 and 1815 was a period of French and then British rule on the Dutch East Indies after the collapse of the Dutch East Indies Company. The First French Empire ruled between 1806 and 1811. The British Empire took over from 1811 to 1815, and transferred control back to the Dutch in 1815.
- The brief Russian interregnum of 1825, caused by uncertainty over who succeeded the deceased Emperor Alexander I, only lasted between 1 December and 26 December 1825, but was used to stage the highly resonant Decembrist revolt. It ended when Grand Duke Konstantin Pavlovich renounced his claim to the throne, allowing Nicholas I to declare himself Tsar.
- After World War I, the Habsburg ruler of the Kingdom of Hungary was disposed. On 1 March 1920, the Kingdom of Hungary was re-established. However, restoration of a Habsburg king was deemed unacceptable by the Entente powers. Instead, the National Assembly of Hungary appointed Miklós Horthy as regent. Charles IV of Hungary made two unsuccessful attempts to retake the throne. Horthy remained as the Regent of Hungary until German invasion on 15 October 1944.
- A brief interregnum occurred in Thailand between 13 October and 1 December 2016 upon the death of King Bhumibol Adulyadej. The crown prince Vajiralongkorn, in an unprecedented move, did not assume the throne immediately after the death of the previous monarch, as he asked for time to mourn while he continued functioning in his role as the crown prince. During this period, Prem Tinsulanonda served as the regent pro tempore.

In some monarchies, such as the United Kingdom, an interregnum is usually avoided due to a rule described as "The King is dead. Long live the King", i.e., the heir to the throne becomes a new monarch immediately on his predecessor's death or abdication. This famous phrase signifies the continuity of sovereignty, attached to a personal form of power named Auctoritas. This is not so in other monarchies where the new monarch's reign begins only with coronation or some other formal or traditional event. In the Polish–Lithuanian Commonwealth, for instance, kings were elected, which often led to relatively long interregna. During that time, it was the Polish primate who served as an interrex (ruler between kings). In Belgium, the heir only becomes king upon swearing an oath of office before the parliament.

== Christianity ==
=== Catholicism ===
A papal interregnum occurs upon the death or resignation of the pope of the Catholic Church, though this particular form is called sede vacante (literally "when the seat is vacant"). The interregnum ends immediately upon the election of a new pope by the College of Cardinals.

=== Anglicanism ===
"Interregnum" is the term used in the Anglican Communion to describe the period before a new parish priest is appointed to fill a vacancy. During an interregnum, the administration of the parish is the responsibility of the churchwardens.

=== The Church of Jesus Christ of Latter-Day Saints ===
In the Church of Jesus Christ of Latter-day Saints, when the President of The Church dies, the First Presidency is dissolved and the Quorum of the Twelve Apostles (the Twelve) becomes the Church's presiding body. Any members of the First Presidency who were formerly members of the Twelve rejoin that quorum. The period between the death of the President and the reorganization of the First Presidency is known as an "Apostolic Interregnum".

== Chess ==
FIDE, the world governing body of international chess competition, has had two Interregnum periods of having no chess champions, both during the 1940s.

=== Men ===
- 1946–1948 — Men's World Chess Champion Alexander Alekhine died of natural causes in 1946. The interregnum lasted until 1948, when Mikhail Botvinnik won a FIDE-held chess tournament to decide on a successor.

=== Women ===
- 1944–1950 — Women's World Chess Champion Vera Menchik was killed in an air-raid during World War II in Britain in 1944. The interregnum lasted until 1950, when Lyudmila Rudenko won a FIDE-held chess tournament to decide on a successor.

== In fiction ==
- The events of Isaac Asimov's Foundation Trilogy take place during the galactic interregnum in his Foundation Universe, taking place in the 25th millennium. Foundation begins at the end of the Galactic Empire and notes in the novels from the Encyclopedia Galactica imply that a Second Galactic Empire follows the 1000-year interregnum.
- In J. R. R. Tolkien's legendarium set in Middle-earth, the disappearance of the King Eärnur of Gondor is followed by a 968-year interregnum (the Steward years), which ends with the return of Aragorn in The Lord of the Rings.
- The Old Kingdom Trilogy takes place after 200 years of interregnum, where the reigning Queen and her two daughters were murdered by Kerrigor, 180 years of regency first and 20 years of anarchy following the death of the last Regent.
- The Vlad Taltos series is set in a fantastical world of magic, at a time directly following a 250-year interregnum wherein traditional sorcery was impossible due to the orb being destroyed.
- In the Elder Scrolls video games, there was an Interregnum in the Second Era when the Second Cyrodillic Empire collapsed. It led to just over four centuries of bickering between small kingdoms and petty states. The Interregnum ended when Tiber Septim, or Talos, formed the Third Empire after a decade of war. Similarly, with the sacrifice of Martin Septim during the Oblivion Crisis in the Third Era, the Septim dynasty came to an end, and a seven-year interregnum occurred before Titus Mede I restored the throne and ushered in the Fourth Era.
- In Poland by James A. Michener, 1983, interregnum is mentioned numerous times in the ever-shifting power struggles that plagued that country, even up to the 1980s.
- In the film A Christmas Prince, the Kingdom of Aldovia limits interregna to a maximum of one year. This becomes a central plot point when it appears Crown Prince Richard may not accept the throne prior to the Christmas deadline.

== In media ==
- The television game show Jeopardy! has been regarded as being in Interregnum from Season 37 after the death of Alex Trebek following the taping of Episode 75 (aired January 8, 2021), and lasting until Episode 71 of Season 40 (aired December 15, 2023), the first broadcast day after the show officially named Ken Jennings as permanent full-time host. The interregnum featured guest hosts from Trebek's death, then during Season 38, a one-week hosting session of Mike Richards that ended following the taping of Episode 5 (aired 17 September 2021), and the official naming of Mayim Bialik as host with Jennings as her substitute. Due to the split duties, it was considered an interregnum until Sony released Bialik on 15 December 2023, even though Jennings has hosted full-time since 1 May 2023 (shows aired July 3, 2023).

== See also ==
- Argentina presidential transition
- Giorgio Agamben
- Geoffrey of Monmouth
- Power vacuum
- Reichsverweser
  - Imperial Vicar
  - Interrex
  - Interrex (Poland)
  - Regent of Hungary
- Reign
- Sede vacante
- United States presidential transition

== Bibliography ==
- Giorgio Agamben's State of Exception (2005).
- Ernst Kantorowicz's The King's Two Bodies (1957).
- Koptev, Aleksandr. "The Five-Day Interregnum in The Roman Republic." The Classical Quarterly 66.1 (2016): 205–221.
- Theophanidis, Philippe "Interregnum as a Legal and Political Concept: A Brief Contextual Survey", Synthesis, Issue 9 (Fall 2016): 109–124.
