= World Chess Championship 1910 =

World Chess Championship 1910 may refer to:

- World Chess Championship 1910 (Lasker–Schlechter)
- World Chess Championship 1910 (Lasker–Janowski)
