= List of World Chess Championships =

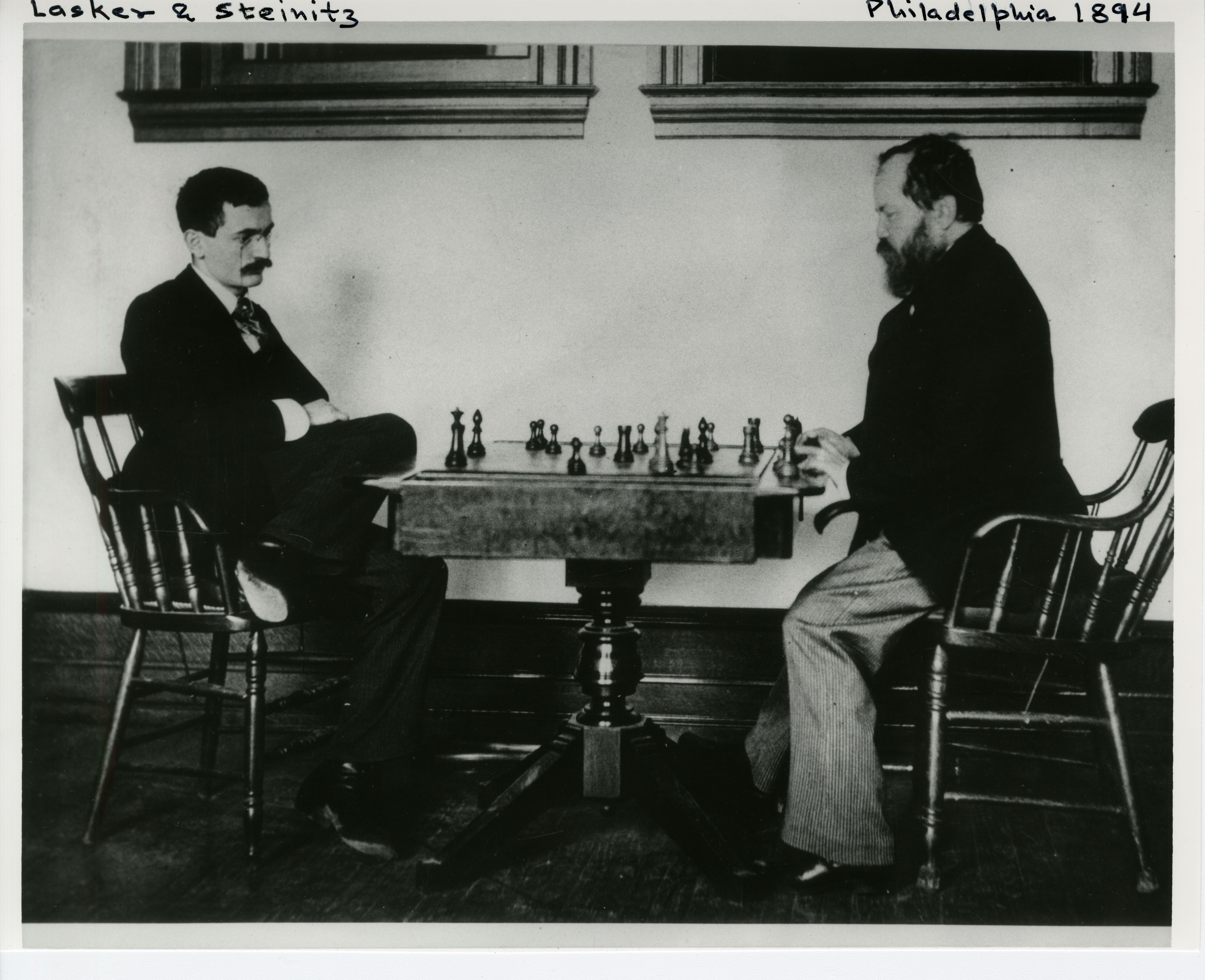
Emanuel Lasker (left) facing incumbent champion Wilhelm Steinitz (right) in Philadelphia during the 1894 World Chess Championship

The World Chess Championship has taken various forms over time, including both match and tournament play. While the concept of a world champion of chess had already existed for decades, with several events considered by some to have established the world's foremost player, an event explicitly held to decide a world champion did not take place until 1886. World Championships were initially privately organized matches, with each requiring the consent of the incumbent champion to take place. After 1948, the International Chess Federation (FIDE) began organizing the Championship under its auspices. The championship was fixed to a three-year cycle, with each challenger decided by a Candidates Tournament. In 1993, the short-lived Professional Chess Association (PCA) split from FIDE, and as a result there were two competing World Championship titles between 1993 and 2006.

== Key ==
Key to symbols and headers
Date	The year the event took place, further disambiguated as needed
†	Event was a tournament, as opposed to a match.
‡	Event resulted in a draw, with the champion retaining the title.
#	Scheduled event did not take place.
✻	Event began, but was abandoned without any result.
Winner	The winner of the event, or the champion otherwise retaining the title. Numerals denote the updated number of event wins or title defences by the champion.
Score	The performance of the eventual champion. Segments such as tiebreaks are listed sequentially. Head-to-head tournament results are given in a footnote.
Runner-up	The second-place finisher of the event, or the challenger for a match without a winner
Ref	References and footnotes corresponding to the event

== Predecessor events (before 1886) ==
Chess was first introduced to Europe during the 9th century. In the early modern era, following the solidification of the modern rules of chess, the game continued to carry consistent prestige and public interest. While numerous players have been characterized as the game's strongest over the centuries, the idea of an international chess match or tournament did not occur until the 18th century, and did not materialize until the 19th century. While the following events did not have the title of World Champion at stake, they have been recognized either at the time or in retrospect as indicating the world's leading player.

Predecessor events prior to 1886
Date	Location	Winner	Score	Runner-up	Format	Ref
1834	(United Kingdom) London	(France) Louis de La Bourdonnais	18–7 4–5 6½–5½ 11½–6½ 7½–4½ 4–5	(United Kingdom) Alexander McDonnell	Casual play	
1843	(France) Paris	(United Kingdom) Howard Staunton	13–8	(France) Pierre Saint-Amant	First to 11 wins	
1851†	(United Kingdom) London	(Kingdom of Prussia) Adolf Anderssen	15–6 (Note: 2½–½ Kieseritzky; 4–2 Szén; 4–1 Staunton; 4½–2½ Wyvill)	(United Kingdom) Marmaduke Wyvill	Single-elimination tournament with 16 players	
1858	(France) Paris	(United States) Paul Morphy	8–3	(Kingdom of Prussia) Adolf Anderssen	First to 7 wins	
1862†	(United Kingdom) London	(Kingdom of Prussia) Adolf Anderssen	11½–1½	(German Confederation) Louis Paulsen	Round-robin tournament with 14 players	
1866	(United Kingdom) London	(Austrian Empire) Wilhelm Steinitz	8–6	(Kingdom of Prussia) Adolf Anderssen	Best of 15	
1883†	(United Kingdom) London	(United Kingdom) Johannes Zukertort	22–4	(Austria-Hungary) Wilhelm Steinitz	Double round-robin tournament with 14 players	

== Privately organized matches (1886–1946) ==
With both Wilhelm Steinitz and Johannes Zukertort seen as plausible claimants, the two played a match for the first World Championship in 1886. While Steinitz would later claim that he had been the World Champion since the 1860s, no match before 1886 was played for any formal title. From then until after World War II, championship matches were privately organized, and the champion was not formally obliged to face an opponent. An agreement had to be reached between the champion, the challenger, and the patrons sponsoring each match, which included providing the funds for the prize pool. Lasker's 27-year reign as World Champion is the longest in the history of organized chess since 1886, but featured two separate 10-year spans during which he did not defend his title.

Privately organized matches (1886–1946)
Date	Location	Winner	Score	Runner-up	Format	Ref
1886	(United States) New York City (1–5); St. Louis (6–9); New Orleans (10–20)	(United States) Wilhelm Steinitz	12½–7½	(United Kingdom) Johannes Zukertort	First to 10 wins	
1889	(Spanish Empire) Havana	(United States) Wilhelm Steinitz (2)	10½–6½	(Russia) Mikhail Chigorin	Best of 20, tiebreak if required	
1890–1891	(United States) New York City	(United States) Wilhelm Steinitz (3)	10½–8½	(Lands of the Crown of Saint Stephen) Isidor Gunsberg	Best of 20, tiebreak if required	
1892	(Spanish Empire) Havana	(United States) Wilhelm Steinitz (4)	10–10 2½–½	(Russia) Mikhail Chigorin	Best of 20, tiebreak if required	
1894	(United States) New York City (1–8); Philadelphia (9–11); (Canada) Montréal (12–19)	(German Empire) Emanuel Lasker	12–7	(United States) Wilhelm Steinitz	First to 10 wins	
1896–1897	(Russia) Moscow	(German Empire) Emanuel Lasker (2)	12½–4½	(United States) Wilhelm Steinitz	First to 10 wins	
1907	(United States) New York City (1–6, 15); Philadelphia (7–8); Washington, D.C. (9); Baltimore (10); Chicago (11); Memphis (12–14)	(German Empire) Emanuel Lasker (3)	11½–3½	(United States) Frank Marshall	First to 8 wins	
1908	(German Empire) Düsseldorf (1–4); Munich (5–16)	(German Empire) Emanuel Lasker (4)	10½–5½	(German Empire) Siegbert Tarrasch	First to 8 wins	
Jan–Feb 1910‡	(Austria-Hungary) Vienna (1–5); (German Empire) Berlin (6–10)	(German Empire) Emanuel Lasker (5)	5–5	(Austria-Hungary) Carl Schlechter	Best of 10	
Nov–Dec 1910	(Germany) Berlin	(Germany) Emanuel Lasker (6)	9½–1½	(France) Dawid Janowski	First to 8 wins	
1921	(Cuba) Havana	(Cuba) José Raúl Capablanca	9–5	(Weimar Republic) Emanuel Lasker	Best of 24	
1927	(Argentina) Buenos Aires	(France) Alexander Alekhine	18½–15½	(Cuba) José Raúl Capablanca	First to 6 wins	
1929	(Germany) Wiesbaden (1–8, 24–25); Heidelberg (9–11); Berlin (12–17); (Netherlands) The Hague (18–19, 23); Rotterdam (20); Amsterdam (21–22)	(France) Alexander Alekhine (2)	15½–9½	(Weimar Republic) Efim Bogoljubow	First to both 6 wins and 15 points	
1934	(Germany) 12 cities (Note: Baden-Baden (1–3); Villingen (4–5); Freiburg (6–8); Pforzheim (9–10); Stuttgart (11–12); Munich (13–15); Bayreuth (16); Kissingen (17–18); Nuremberg (19–20); Karlsruhe (21); Mannheim (22–24); Berlin (25–26))	(France) Alexander Alekhine (3)	15½–10½	(Germany) Efim Bogoljubow	First to both 6 wins and 15 points	
1935	(Netherlands) 12 cities (Note: Amsterdam (1–3, 8–9, 12–13, 18, 20, 23, 25–26, 28–30); The Hague (4, 6, 11, 22, 27); Delft (5, 24); Utrecht (7); Gouda (10); Groningen (14); Baarn (15); 's-Hertogenbosch (16); Eindhoven (17); Zeist (19); Ermelo (21); Zandvoort (26). Game 26 began on one day in Zandvoort, and was finished on a later day in Amsterdam.)	(Netherlands) Max Euwe	15½–14½	(France) Alexander Alekhine	First to both 6 wins and 15 points	
1937	(Netherlands) 9 cities (Note: The Hague (1, 5, 9–10, 17–18, 25); Rotterdam (2, 7, 15–16, 23–24); Amsterdam (3–4, 12–13, 20–21); Haarlem (6); Leiden (8); Groningen (11); Zwolle (14); Eindhoven (19); Delft (22))	(France) Alexander Alekhine (4)	15½–9½	(Netherlands) Max Euwe	First to both 6 wins and 15 points	
Title vacant from 1946 to 1948, following the death of Alekhine.

== FIDE World Championships (1948–1990) ==
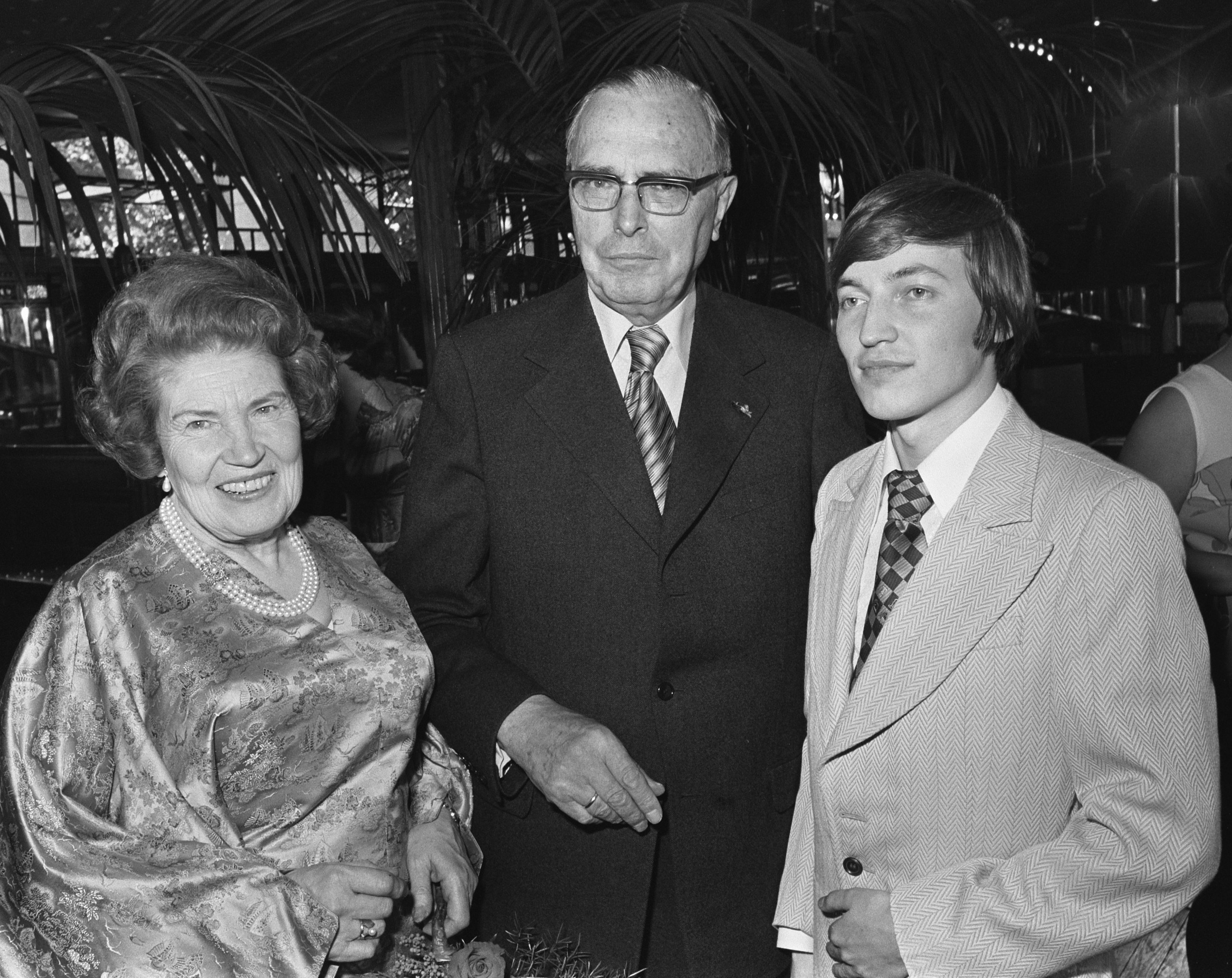
From right to left: World Champion Anatoly Karpov, former World Champion and FIDE President Max Euwe, and Euwe's wife Caro Bergman. Photo taken in 1976.

In 1946, Alexander Alekhine died while still holding the title of World Chess Champion. The International Chess Federation (FIDE), which had been founded in 1924, had been attempting to directly participate in organizing the World Championship since at least 1935. By the late 1940s, around half of the plausible contenders for the World Championship were Soviet citizens, and in 1947, the Soviet Chess Federation joined FIDE after decades of declining to do so. FIDE based the 1948 World Chess Championship on the 1938 AVRO tournament that had been organized in part to select a challenger for Alekhine. The tournament ultimately featured five players, three of them Soviet citizens—including the winner, Mikhail Botvinnik. Botvinnik went on to win or retain in four further championship matches. At the same time, FIDE established the rules for the championship going forward. It was organized around a 3-year cycle, during which a series of Zonal and Interzonal tournaments were held, with their highest-scoring performers invited to a Candidates Tournament. The winner of the Candidates tournament in turn played the champion in a match for the title. A defeated champion was entitled to a rematch the following year, after which the 3-year cycle would resume. Botvinnik benefited from this rule twice, in 1958 and 1961.

With the exception of the American Bobby Fischer in 1972, Soviet citizens won every championship from 1948 until the dissolution of the Soviet Union in 1991. With the further exception of Viktor Korchnoi, who had defected from the USSR in 1976, each challenger was also a Soviet citizen. Following his victory, Fischer never played another game organized by FIDE. Disagreements between the two parties—which included Fischer's insistence on a format that required the victor to get a certain number of wins, as opposed to the number of games in a match being fixed—led to his forfeiting the title in 1975. In the absence of a match, FIDE declared Anatoly Karpov, winner of the 1974 Candidates Tournament, to be the World Chess Champion by default.

While the issue had played a role in Fischer's forfeit, FIDE ultimately did change the match format going forward, such that the first to win 6 games would be champion. Under these rules, Karpov twice defended his title against Korchnoi. The next match—which began in September 1984 and featured the 21-year-old Garry Kasparov as Karpov's challenger—ultimately saw 48 games played over the span of five months, with neither player able to get to 6 wins. In an unprecedented step, FIDE president Florencio Campomanes stepped in and declared the match to have ended with no result. A new match, reverted to having a set number of games, was to be played later in 1985. After nearly being knocked out early in 1984, Kasparov defeated Karpov in their rematch. Over the following decade, the two played three more championship matches, with Kasparov narrowly retaining the title in each.

FIDE World Championships (1948–1990)
Date	Location	Winner	Score	Runner-up	Format	Ref
1948†	(Netherlands) The Hague (1–10); (Soviet Union) Moscow (11–20)	(Soviet Union) Mikhail Botvinnik	14–6 (Note: 3–2 Smyslov; 4–1 Keres; 3½–1½ Reshevsky; 3½–1½ Euwe)	(Soviet Union) Vasily Smyslov	Quintuple round-robin tournament with 5 players	
1951‡	(Soviet Union) Moscow	(Soviet Union) Mikhail Botvinnik (2)	12–12	(Soviet Union) David Bronstein	Best of 24	
1954‡	(Soviet Union) Moscow	(Soviet Union) Mikhail Botvinnik (3)	12–12	(Soviet Union) Vasily Smyslov	Best of 24	
1957	(Soviet Union) Moscow	(Soviet Union) Vasily Smyslov	12½–9½	(Soviet Union) Mikhail Botvinnik	Best of 24	
1958	(Soviet Union) Moscow	(Soviet Union) Mikhail Botvinnik (4)	12½–10½	(Soviet Union) Vasily Smyslov	Best of 24	
1960	(Soviet Union) Moscow	(Soviet Union) Mikhail Tal	12½–8½	(Soviet Union) Mikhail Botvinnik	Best of 24	
1961	(Soviet Union) Moscow	(Soviet Union) Mikhail Botvinnik (5)	13–8	(Soviet Union) Mikhail Tal	Best of 24	
1963	(Soviet Union) Moscow	(Soviet Union) Tigran Petrosian	12½–9½	(Soviet Union) Mikhail Botvinnik	Best of 24	
1966	(Soviet Union) Moscow	(Soviet Union) Tigran Petrosian (2)	12½–11½	(Soviet Union) Boris Spassky	Best of 24	
1969	(Soviet Union) Moscow	(Soviet Union) Boris Spassky	12½–10½	(Soviet Union) Tigran Petrosian	Best of 24	
1972	(Iceland) Reykjavík	(United States) Bobby Fischer	12½–8½	(Soviet Union) Boris Spassky	Best of 24	
1975#	(Philippines) Manila	(Soviet Union) Anatoly Karpov	—	(United States) Bobby Fischer	Best of 24	
1978	(Philippines) Baguio	(Soviet Union) Anatoly Karpov (2)	16½–15½	(FIDE) Viktor Korchnoi	First to 6 wins	
1981	(Italy) Merano	(Soviet Union) Anatoly Karpov (3)	11–7	(Switzerland) Viktor Korchnoi	First to 6 wins	
1984–1985✻	(Soviet Union) Moscow	(Soviet Union) Anatoly Karpov	25–23	(Soviet Union) Garry Kasparov	First to 6 wins	
1985	(Soviet Union) Moscow	(Soviet Union) Garry Kasparov	13–11	(Soviet Union) Anatoly Karpov	Best of 24	
1986	(United Kingdom) London (1–12); (Soviet Union) Leningrad (13–24)	(Soviet Union) Garry Kasparov (2)	12½–11½	(Soviet Union) Anatoly Karpov	Best of 24	
1987‡	(Spain) Seville	(Soviet Union) Garry Kasparov (3)	12–12	(Soviet Union) Anatoly Karpov	Best of 24	
1990	(United States) New York City (1–12); (France) Lyon (13–24)	(Russia) Garry Kasparov (4)	12½–11½	(Soviet Union) Anatoly Karpov	Best of 24	

== Split title (1993–2006) ==
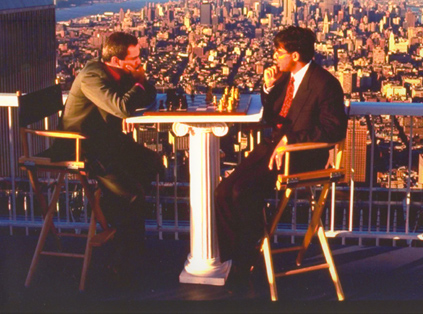
Play between Garry Kasparov (left) and Viswanathan Anand (right) in the Top of the World observation deck of 2 World Trade Center during the 1995 PCA World Chess Championship

In 1993, following Nigel Short's victory in the Candidates Tournament, FIDE president Campomanes announced that that year's Championship would take place in Manchester, England. Both Kasparov and Short claimed that FIDE had made this decision without consulting either player, in violation of FIDE's regulations regarding the championship. Kasparov and Short responded by splitting from FIDE and forming the Professional Chess Association (PCA), which organized a World Championship match between the two, played in London later that year. Meanwhile, FIDE stripped Kasparov of his title and organized a championship match between Karpov and Jan Timman, who had finished second and third in the Candidates Tournament. For the 13 years between 1993 and 2006, there were two rival titles. While the PCA itself would fold after only a couple of years, Kasparov would retain what is referred to as "Classical" title, which would be inherited by Vladimir Kramnik upon defeating Kasparov in 2000.

Meanwhile, FIDE once again began experimenting with the championship format. Beginning with the 1998 championship, the system of Zonal, Interzonal, Candidates, and Championship stages was replaced with one single-elimination tournament featuring dozens of players competing for the championship. For the next event in 1999, the incumbent World Champion would not automatically qualify for the finals. Due to this additional change, Karpov—who had won three additional titles during the schism—declined to participate going forward. Each of the four Classical Championships retained a traditional match format.

Classical World Chess Championships (1993–2006)
Date	Location	Winner	Score	Runner-up	Format	Ref
1993	(United Kingdom) London	(Russia) Garry Kasparov (5)	12½–7½	(United Kingdom) Nigel Short	Best of 24	
1995	(United States) New York City	(Russia) Garry Kasparov (6)	10½–7½	(India) Viswanathan Anand	Best of 20	
2000	(United Kingdom) London	(Russia) Vladimir Kramnik	8½–6½	(Russia) Garry Kasparov	Best of 16	
2004‡	(Switzerland) Brissago	(Russia) Vladimir Kramnik (2)	7–7	(Hungary) Peter Leko	Best of 14	

FIDE World Chess Championships (1993–2006)
Date	Location	Winner	Score	Runner-up	Format	Ref
1993	(Netherlands) Zwolle (1–3); Arnhem (4–6); Amsterdam (7–12); (Indonesia) Jakarta (13–24)	(Russia) Anatoly Karpov (4)	12½–8½	(Netherlands) Jan Timman	Best of 24	
1996	(Russia) Elista	(Russia) Anatoly Karpov (5)	10½–7½	(United States) Gata Kamsky	Best of 20	
1998†	(Switzerland) Lausanne	(Russia) Anatoly Karpov (6)	3–3 2–0 (Note: Karpov was automatically seeded into the final round: a best of 6, with tiebreaks as needed.)	(India) Viswanathan Anand	Single-elimination tournament with 100 players	
1999†	(United States) Las Vegas	(Russia) Alexander Khalifman	18½–11½ (Note: 3½–2½ Barua; 2½–1½ Kamsky; 1½–½ Asrian; 2½–1½ Gelfand; 1½–½ Polgár; 3½–2½ Nisipeanu; 3½–2½ Akopian)	(Armenia) Vladimir Akopian	Single-elimination tournament with 100 players	
2000†	(India) New Delhi (rounds 1–6); (Iran) Tehran (round 7)	(India) Viswanathan Anand	14–6 (Note: Anand had a bye in the first round.: 1½–½ Bologan; 1½–½ Lputian; 1½–½ Macieja; 3½–2½ Khalifman; 2½–1½ Adams; 3½–½ Shirov)	(Spain) Alexei Shirov	Single-elimination tournament with 100 players	
2002†	(Russia) Moscow	(Ukraine) Ruslan Ponomariov	19–9 (Note: 1½–½ Li; 3–1 Tiviakov; 2–0 Georgiev; 2½–1½ Morozevich; 3–1 Bareev; 2½–1½ Svidler; 4½–2½ Ivanchuk)	(Ukraine) Vasyl Ivanchuk	Single-elimination tournament with 128 players	
2004†	(Libya) Tripoli	(Uzbekistan) Rustam Kasimdzhanov	20–10 (Note: 2½–1½ Ramírez; 1½–½ Ghaem Maghami; 2½–1½ Ivanchuk; 2–0 Almási; 3–1 Grischuk; 4–2 Topalov; 4½–3½ Adams)	(England) Michael Adams	Single-elimination tournament with 128 players	
2005†	(Argentina) Potrero de los Funes	(Bulgaria) Veselin Topalov	10–4 (Note: 1–1 Anand; 1½–½ Svidler; 1½–½ Morozevich; 1½–½ Leko; 1½–½ Kasimdzhanov; 1½–½ Adams; 1½–½ Polgár)	(India) Viswanathan Anand	Double round-robin tournament with 8 players	

== FIDE World Championships (2006–present) ==
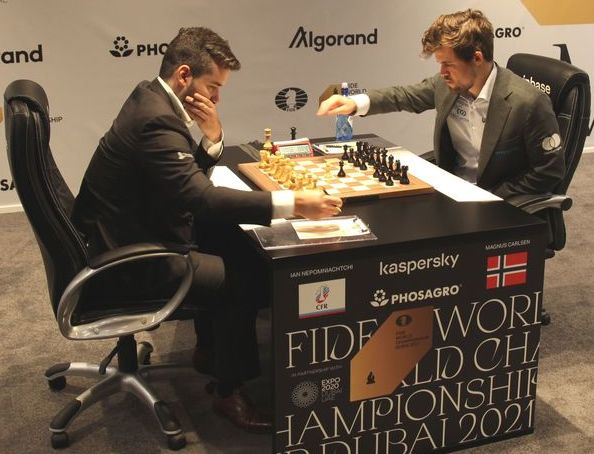
Ian Nepomniachtchi (left) and Magnus Carlsen (right) beginning game 11 of the 2021 Championship

Following a period of negotiation, in 2006 the Classical Champion Vladimir Kramnik played a match against the FIDE Champion Veselin Topalov to reunify the World Championship. Since then, the championship has remained under the auspices of FIDE. The Candidates Tournament returned, and with the exception of the 2007 tournament, FIDE would return to a match format for the World Championship. Instead of the previous system of Zonals and Interzonals to provide candidates, the system was redesigned around the Chess World Cup. Later, means for selecting candidates would variously include the FIDE Grand Prix, the FIDE Grand Swiss Tournament, selection by rating, and wild cards selected by the venue hosting the event.

While shorter matches had taken place at various points, the block of 12 classical games was much shorter than matches had been for much of the 20th century. In the 2018 match, all 12 classical games resulted in draws for the first time in the history of the championship. Following this, the number of games was increased to 14. Citing a lack of motivation and interest in the format, incumbent five-time champion Magnus Carlsen declined to defend his title in 2023. Instead, the match featured the two best performers in the Candidates, with Ding Liren defeating Ian Nepomniachtchi to become the new World Champion. Carlsen later declined his spot in the 2024 Candidates Tournament.

FIDE World Championships (2006–present)
Date	Location	Winner	Score	Runner-up	Format	Ref
2006	(Russia) Elista	(Russia) Vladimir Kramnik (3)	6–6 2½–1½	(Bulgaria) Veselin Topalov	Best of 12, tiebreaks if necessary	
2007†	Mexico City	(India) Viswanathan Anand (2)	9–5 (Note: 1–1 Kramnik; 1–1 Gelfand; 1–1 Leko; 1½–½ Svidler; 1½–½ Morozevich; 1½–½ Aronian; 1½–½ Grischuk)	(Russia) Vladimir Kramnik	Double round-robin tournament with 8 players	
2008	(Germany) Bonn	(India) Viswanathan Anand (3)	6½–4½	(Russia) Vladimir Kramnik	Best of 12, tiebreaks if necessary	
2010	(Bulgaria) Sofia	(India) Viswanathan Anand (4)	6½–5½	(Bulgaria) Veselin Topalov	Best of 12, tiebreaks if necessary	
2012	(Russia) Moscow	(India) Viswanathan Anand (5)	6–6 2½–1½	(Israel) Boris Gelfand	Best of 12, tiebreaks if necessary	
2013	(India) Chennai	(Norway) Magnus Carlsen	6½–3½	(India) Viswanathan Anand	Best of 12, tiebreaks if necessary	
2014	(Russia) Sochi	(Norway) Magnus Carlsen (2)	6½–4½	(India) Viswanathan Anand	Best of 12, tiebreaks if necessary	
2016	(United States) New York City	(Norway) Magnus Carlsen (3)	6–6 3–1	(Russia) Sergey Karjakin	Best of 12, tiebreaks if necessary	
2018	(United Kingdom) London	(Norway) Magnus Carlsen (4)	6–6 3–0	(United States) Fabiano Caruana	Best of 12, tiebreaks if necessary	
2021	(United Arab Emirates) Dubai	(Norway) Magnus Carlsen (5)	7½–3½	Ian Nepomniachtchi	Best of 14, tiebreaks if necessary	
2023	(Kazakhstan) Astana	(China) Ding Liren	7–7 2½–1½	(FIDE) Ian Nepomniachtchi	Best of 14, tiebreaks if necessary	
2024	Singapore	(India) Gukesh Dommaraju	7½–6½	(China) Ding Liren	Best of 14, tiebreaks if necessary	
2026	(Switzerland) Geneva	(India) Gukesh Dommaraju vs. (Uzbekistan) Javokhir Sindarov			Best of 14, tiebreaks if necessary	

== Unrecognized championship events ==
In 1909, amid discussions that would ultimately culminate with the World Championship match played the following year, Emanuel Lasker played a casual match with Dawid Janowski in Paris. This was reported in later decades as being a World Championship match. However, research by Edward Winter has demonstrated that the title was not at stake.

Unrecognized championship events
Date	Location	Winner	Score	Runner-up	Format
1909	(France) Paris	(German Empire) Emanuel Lasker	8–2	(France) Dawid Janowski	Best of 10, casual play

== See also ==
- List of strong chess tournaments
- Fischer–Spassky (1992 match) – rematch between Bobby Fischer and Boris Spassky in Belgrade 20 years after their first match, considered by Fischer to be and billed as a World Chess Championship. Fischer won 10–5, with 15 draws.
