= World Chess Championship 1921 =

	Defending champion	Challenger
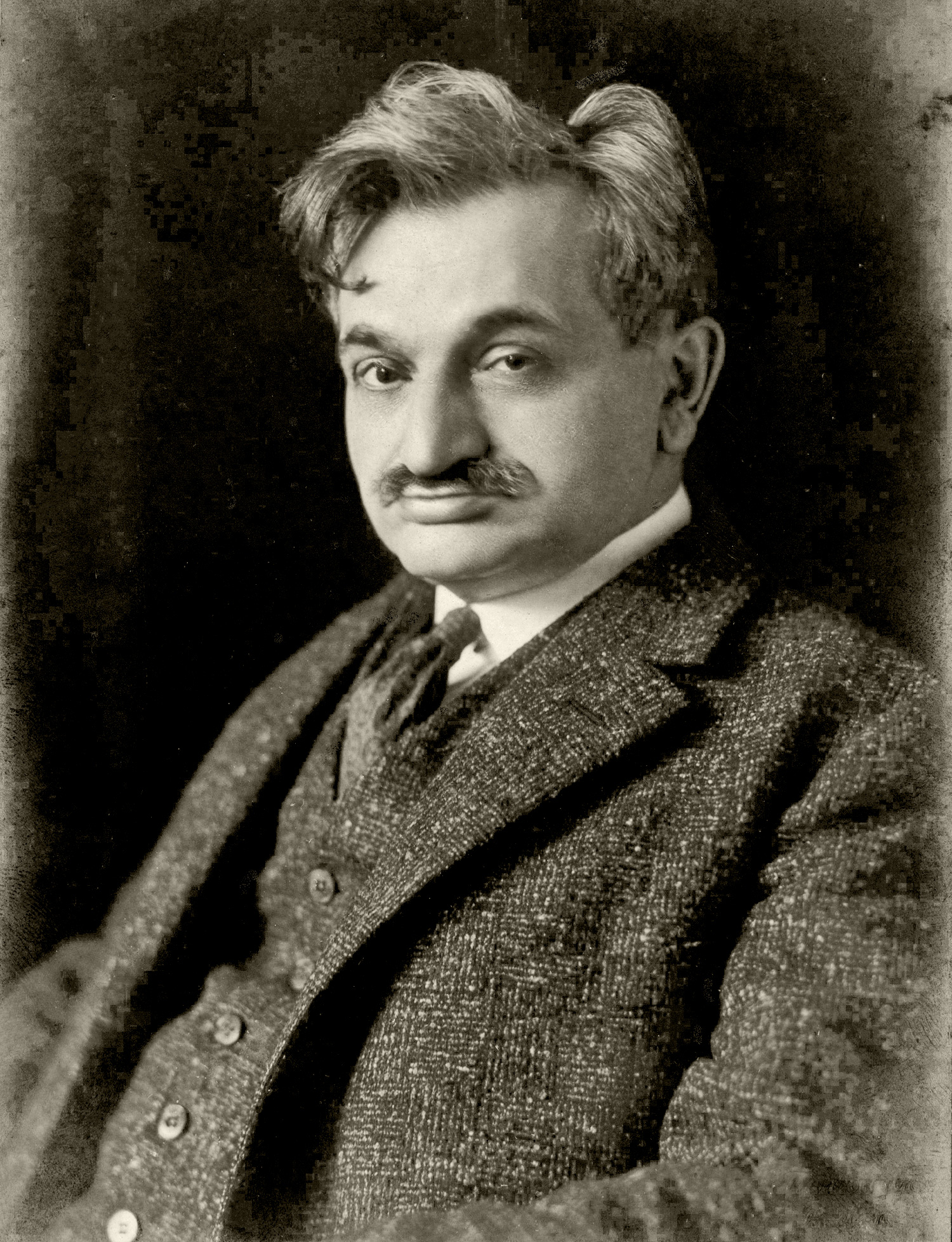
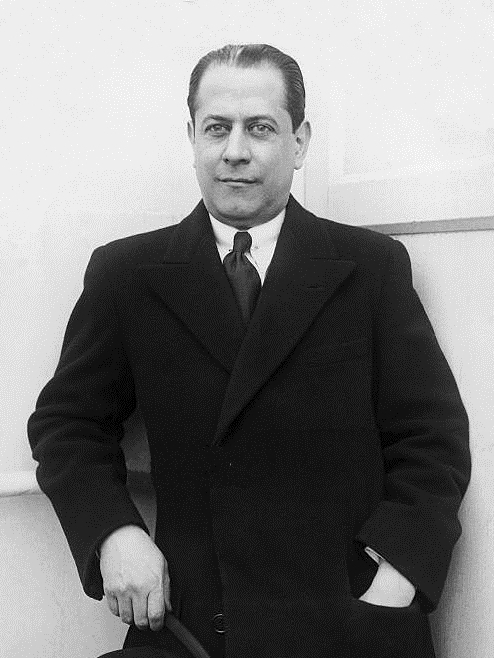
	Emanuel Lasker	Jose Raul Capablanca
	(Weimar Republic) Emanuel Lasker	(Cuba) José Raúl Capablanca
5	Scores	9
	Born 24 December 1868; 52 years old	Born 19 November 1888; 32 years old

The 1921 World Chess Championship was played between José Raúl Capablanca and Emanuel Lasker. It was played in Capablanca's native Havana from March 18 to April 28. Capablanca won the match by a score of 9–5 (4 wins, 0 losses, 10 draws) to become the third World Chess Champion.

== Background ==
Partly due to World War I, negotiations for this match took nearly 10 years. Lasker had been the World Champion since defeating William Steinitz in 1894, and had successfully defended his world title five times, most recently against Dawid Janowski in 1910.

In 1911, 22-year-old Capablanca won the San Sebastián chess tournament ahead of most of the world's leading players apart from Lasker. Later that year he challenged Lasker to a match for the world title. Lasker was unwilling to play the traditional first-to-win-ten-games-type of match in the semi-tropical conditions of Havana, especially as drawn games were becoming more frequent and the match might last for over six months. He therefore made a counter-proposal: if neither player had a lead of at least two games by the end of the match, it should be considered a draw; the match should be limited to the best of thirty games, counting draws; except that if either player won six games and led by at least two games before thirty games were completed, he should be declared the winner; the champion should decide the venue and stakes, and should have the exclusive right to publish the games; the challenger should deposit a forfeit of US$2,000 (equivalent to roughly $343,000 in 2022 values, based on income value); the time limit should be twelve moves per hour; play should be limited to two sessions of 2½ hours each per day, five days a week. Capablanca objected to the time limit, the short playing times, the thirty-game limit, and especially the requirement that he must win by two games to claim the title, which he regarded as unfair. Lasker took offence at the terms in which Capablanca criticized the two-game lead condition and broke off negotiations, and until 1914 Lasker and Capablanca were not on speaking terms. However, at the St. Petersburg 1914 chess tournament, Capablanca proposed a set of rules for the conduct of World Championship matches, which were accepted by all the leading players, including Lasker.

In 1912, Akiba Rubinstein emerged as a potential challenger when he won the three strongest tournaments that year, at San Sebastian, Breslau and Pistyan. Late in 1912, Lasker entered into negotiations for a world title match with Rubinstein, and the two players agreed to play a match if Rubinstein could raise the funds. Rubinstein had difficulty finding the money; eventually a match was arranged for October 1914, but it did not take place because of the outbreak of World War I.

However, Rubinstein's relatively poor showing at the St. Petersburg 1914 chess tournament in April and May (Lasker 1st, Capablanca 2nd, Rubinstein 7th) meant that Capablanca was again seen as the more deserving challenger.

The war from 1914 to 1918 prevented any World Championship during that time.

Negotiations resumed with Capablanca in 1920. Lasker resigned the title in 1920 in a dispute over match conditions, and named Capablanca as his successor. Judging by chess publications of the time, there was little acceptance for Capablanca becoming champion this way: the feeling was that Lasker could resign the world title, but he had no right to name Capablanca as champion. Later in 1920, Lasker agreed to play the 1921 match, as the challenger.

Ossip Bernstein wrote in Chess Review in 1955 that shortly before Lasker departed for Havana he asked whether Lasker had prepared for the match, rested beforehand, studied Capablanca's games, worked on openings, or even intended to take a chessboard to study during the voyage. According to Bernstein, Lasker's answer to all of them was no, which Bernstein considered to be "pure madness". Capablanca also made no special preparations for the match, but he never did, and had the advantages of being 20 years younger than Lasker and playing the match in his home town and climate.

== Results ==
The championship was set to last for 24 games: the first player to accumulate 12½ points (or win eight games) would be World Champion. If it ended 12–12, Capablanca would be world champion, as Lasker was considered the challenger.

World Chess Championship Match 1921
	1	2	3	4	5	6	7	8	9	10	11	12	13	14	Wins	Points
José Raúl Capablanca (Cuba)	½	½	½	½	1	½	½	½	½	1	1	½	½	1	4	9
Emanuel Lasker (Germany)	½	½	½	½	0	½	½	½	½	0	0	½	½	0	0	5

Lasker resigned the match after the 14th game, making Capablanca the undisputed champion.

== Games ==
=== Game 1: Capablanca–Lasker ½-½ ===
Lasker obtained a good position as Black, but later got into trouble and had to play precisely to draw. Match tied ½–½ with 1 draw.

Queen's Gambit Declined
1.d4 d5 2.Nf3 e6 3.c4 Nf6 4.Bg5 Be7 5.e3 Nbd7 6.Nc3 O-O 7.Rc1 b6 8.cxd5 exd5 9.Bb5 Bb7 10.Qa4 a6 11.Bxd7 Nxd7 12.Bxe7 Qxe7 13.Qb3 Qd6 14.O-O Rfd8 15.Rfd1 Rab8 16.Ne1 Nf6 17.Rc2 c5 18.dxc5 bxc5 19.Ne2 Ne4 20.Qa3 Rbc8 21.Ng3 Nxg3 22.hxg3 Qb6 23.Rcd2 h6 24.Nf3 d4 25.exd4 Bxf3 26.Qxf3 Rxd4 27.Rc2 Rxd1+ 28.Qxd1 Rd8 29.Qe2 Qd6 30.Kh2 Qd5 31.b3 Qf5 32.g4 Qg5 33.g3 Rd6 34.Kg2 g6 35.Qc4 Re6 36.Qxc5 Qxg4 37.f3 Qg5 38.Qxg5 hxg5 39.Kf2 Rd6 40.Ke3 Re6+ 41.Kd4 Rd6+ 42.Ke3 Re6+ 43.Kf2 Rd6 44.g4 Rd1 45.Ke2 Ra1 46.Kd3 Kg7 47.b4 Rf1 48.Ke3 Rb1 49.Rc6 Rxb4 50.Rxa6 Rb2 ½-½

=== Game 2: Lasker–Capablanca ½-½ ===
Queen's Gambit Declined
1.d4 d5 2.c4 e6 3.Nc3 Nf6 4.Nf3 Nbd7 5.e3 Be7 6.Bd3 O-O 7.O-O dxc4 8.Bxc4 c5 9.Qe2 a6 10.Rd1 b5 11.Bd3 Bb7 12.e4 cxd4 13.Nxd4 Ne5 14.Nb3 Nxd3 15.Rxd3 Qc7 16.e5 Nd5 17.Rg3 Nxc3 18.Rxc3 Qd7 19.Rg3 Rfd8 20.Bh6 g6 21.Be3 Qd5 22.Na5 Rac8 23.Nxb7 Qxb7 24.Bh6 Qd5 25.b3 Qd4 26.Rf1 Rd5 27.Re3 Ba3 28.g3 Qb2 29.Re1 Rc2 30.Qf3 Be7 31.R3e2 Rxe2 32.Rxe2 Qb1+ 33.Kg2 Bf8 34.Bf4 h6 35.h4 b4 36.Qe4 Qxe4+ 37.Rxe4 Kg7 38.Rc4 Bc5 39.Kf3 g5 40.hxg5 hxg5 41.Bxg5 ½-½

=== Game 3: Capablanca–Lasker ½-½ ===
The opening began as a Four Knights Game, but transposed to a Ruy Lopez position that can be reached from the Berlin Defense or the Steinitz Defense. Match tied 1½–1½ with 3 draws.

Ruy Lopez, Berlin Defense
1.e4 e5 2.Nf3 Nc6 3.Nc3 Nf6 4.Bb5 d6 5.d4 Bd7 6.O-O Be7 7.Re1 exd4 8.Nxd4 O-O 9.Bxc6 bxc6 10.Bg5 h6 11.Bh4 Re8 12.Qd3 Nh7 13.Bxe7 Rxe7 14.Re3 Qb8 15.b3 Qb6 16.Rae1 Rae8 17.Nf3 Qa5 18.Qd2 Ng5 19.Nxg5 hxg5 20.h3 Re5 21.Rd1 Bc8 22.Rd3 Qb6 23.Kh2 R8e6 24.Rg3 Rf6 25.Kg1 Kf8 26.Na4 Qa5 27.Qxa5 Rxa5 28.Rc3 Bb7 29.f3 Re6 30.Rcd3 Ba6 31.Rd4 f6 32.Rc1 c5 33.Rd2 Bb5 34.Nc3 Bc6 35.a4 Ra6 36.Kf2 Rb6 37.Nd1 Kf7 38.Ne3 Rb8 39.Rh1 Ree8 40.Rdd1 Rh8 41.g4 Bd7 42.Nd5 Rb7 43.Kg3 Rh4 44.Rd3 Be6 45.c4 Rh8 46.Rc1 Ke8 47.Ne3 Kd7 48.Ng2 Rbb8 49.Re1 Kc6 50.Ne3 Rbe8 51.Rb1 Rh7 52.Rd2 Rb8 53.Rd3 Rbh8 54.Rh1 Kb6 55.Rh2 Kc6 56.Rh1 Rb8 57.Rh2 Rf8 58.Rh1 Kd7 59.Rh2 Bf7 60.Nf5 Rfh8 61.Ne3 Ke6 62.Nd5 Rc8 63.Ne3 ½-½

=== Game 4: Lasker–Capablanca ½-½ ===
Queen's Gambit Declined
1.d4 d5 2.c4 e6 3.Nc3 Nf6 4.Bg5 Be7 5.e3 O-O 6.Nf3 Nbd7 7.Qc2 c6 8.Bd3 dxc4 9.Bxc4 Nd5 10.Bxe7 Qxe7 11.O-O Nxc3 12.bxc3 b6 13.Bd3 g6 14.a4 Bb7 15.a5 c5 16.Nd2 e5 17.Be4 Bxe4 18.Qxe4 Rae8 19.axb6 axb6 20.Ra7 exd4 21.Qc6 Rd8 22.cxd4 cxd4 23.exd4 Qf6 24.Qxf6 Nxf6 25.Nf3 Nd5 26.Rb1 f6 27.Kf1 Rf7 28.Rba1 Rdd7 29.Rxd7 Rxd7 30.g3 ½-½

=== Game 5: Capablanca–Lasker 1-0 ===
Lasker blundered in a drawn position for the first decisive game of the match. Capablanca leads 3–2 with 4 draws.

G5, position after 45.Qb7+

Position: a7 black pawn, b7 white queen, e7 black king, f7 black pawn, b6 black pawn, h5 white rook, d4 black queen, b3 white pawn, e3 black knight, a2 white pawn, g1 white king

In a drawn position, Lasker blundered 45...Qf8?? and resigned after 46.Qb8+

Lasker achieved a drawn position but was tired and blundered his knight with 45...Kf8??, resigning after 48.Qb8+ (48...Ke7 49.Qe5+). Black has a pawn for the exchange and could draw after 45...Kd6, 45...Ke6 or 45...Kf6 instead.

Lasker wrote, "A terrible mistake. I had a quarter hour for thinking but I was incapable of doing so. By 45...Ke6 (or 45...Kf6) Black would have avoided the exchange of queens."

Queen's Gambit Declined
1.d4 d5 2.Nf3 Nf6 3.c4 e6 4.Bg5 Nbd7 5.e3 Be7 6.Nc3 O-O 7.Rc1 b6 8.cxd5 exd5 9.Qa4 c5 10.Qc6 Rb8 11.Nxd5 Bb7 12.Nxe7+ Qxe7 13.Qa4 Rbc8 14.Qa3 Qe6 15.Bxf6 Qxf6 16.Ba6 Bxf3 17.Bxc8 Rxc8 18.gxf3 Qxf3 19.Rg1 Re8 20.Qd3 g6 21.Kf1 Re4 22.Qd1 Qh3+ 23.Rg2 Nf6 24.Kg1 cxd4 25.Rc4 dxe3 26.Rxe4 Nxe4 27.Qd8+ Kg7 28.Qd4+ Nf6 29.fxe3 Qe6 30.Rf2 g5 31.h4 gxh4 32.Qxh4 Ng4 33.Qg5+ Kf8 34.Rf5 h5 35.Qd8+ Kg7 36.Qg5+ Kf8 37.Qd8+ Kg7 38.Qg5+ Kf8 39.b3 Qd6 40.Qf4 Qd1+ 41.Qf1 Qd2 42.Rxh5 Nxe3 43.Qf3 Qd4 44.Qa8+ Ke7 45.Qb7+ Kf8 46.Qb8+ 1-0

=== Game 6: Lasker–Capablanca ½-½ ===
Lasker had the advantage in a double-rook endgame but blundered a pawn and had to make a draw. Capablanca leads 3½–2½ with 5 draws.

Ruy Lopez, Berlin Defense
1.e4 e5 2.Nf3 Nc6 3.Bb5 Nf6 4.O-O d6 5.d4 Bd7 6.Nc3 Be7 7.Re1 exd4 8.Nxd4 O-O 9.Bxc6 bxc6 10.Bg5 Re8 11.Qd3 h6 12.Bh4 Nh7 13.Bxe7 Rxe7 14.Qc4 Qe8 15.Re2 Rb8 16.b3 c5 17.Nf3 Bb5 18.Nxb5 Qxb5 19.Qxb5 Rxb5 20.Kf1 Ng5 21.Nd2 Ne6 22.c3 f6 23.Nc4 Nf4 24.Re3 Ng6 25.Nd2 Rb8 26.g3 a5 27.a4 Ne5 28.f4 Nd7 29.Ke2 Nb6 30.Kd3 c6 31.Rae1 Kf7 32.Nc4 Nxc4 33.Kxc4 Re6 34.e5 fxe5 35.fxe5 d5+ 36.Kxc5 Rxb3 37.c4 dxc4 38.Re4 c3 39.Rc4 h5 40.Re3 Rb2 41.Rcxc3 Rxh2 42.Kb6 Rb2+ 43.Kxa5 g5 ½-½

=== Game 7: Capablanca–Lasker ½-½ ===
Queen's Gambit Declined
1.d4 d5 2.Nf3 e6 3.c4 Nf6 4.Bg5 Be7 5.e3 Nbd7 6.Nc3 O-O 7.Rc1 c6 8.Qc2 c5 9.Rd1 Qa5 10.cxd5 Nxd5 11.Bxe7 Nxe7 12.Bd3 Nf6 13.O-O cxd4 14.Nxd4 Bd7 15.Ne4 Ned5 16.Nb3 Qd8 17.Nxf6+ Nxf6 18.Qc5 Qb6 19.Rc1 Rfc8 20.Qxb6 axb6 21.Rxc8+ Rxc8 22.Rc1 Rxc1+ 23.Nxc1 Kf8 ½-½

=== Game 8: Lasker–Capablanca ½-½ ===
Slav Defense
1.d4 d5 2.Nf3 Nf6 3.c4 c6 4.e3 Bf5 5.Nc3 e6 6.Bd3 Bxd3 7.Qxd3 Nbd7 8.O-O Bd6 9.e4 dxe4 10.Nxe4 Nxe4 11.Qxe4 O-O 12.Bd2 Qf6 13.Rad1 Qg6 14.Qxg6 hxg6 15.Bc3 Rfd8 16.Rfe1 Bc7 17.Kf1 Nf8 18.Bd2 f6 19.h4 Kf7 20.g3 Nd7 21.Be3 Nb6 22.Rc1 Nc8 23.Re2 Ne7 24.Rc3 a6 25.a4 Rab8 26.b4 b5 27.cxb5 axb5 28.a5 Bd6 29.Rb3 Nd5 30.Bd2 Rdc8 ½-½

=== Game 9: Capablanca–Lasker ½-½ ===
Tarrasch Defense
1.d4 d5 2.Nf3 e6 3.c4 c5 4.cxd5 exd5 5.Nc3 Nc6 6.g3 Nf6 7.Bg2 Be6 8.O-O Be7 9.dxc5 Bxc5 10.Bg5 d4 11.Ne4 Be7 12.Nxf6+ Bxf6 13.Bxf6 Qxf6 14.Qa4 O-O 15.Qb5 Rab8 16.Rfd1 h6 17.Ne1 Rfe8 18.Rd2 Bg4 19.Rc1 Re5 20.Qd3 Rbe8 21.Bf3 Bxf3 ½-½

=== Game 10: Lasker–Capablanca 0-1 ===
Queen's Gambit Declined
1.d4 d5 2.c4 e6 3.Nc3 Nf6 4.Bg5 Be7 5.e3 O-O 6.Nf3 Nbd7 7.Qc2 c5 8.Rd1 Qa5 9.Bd3 h6 10.Bh4 cxd4 11.exd4 dxc4 12.Bxc4 Nb6 13.Bb3 Bd7 14.O-O Rac8 15.Ne5 Bb5 16.Rfe1 Nbd5 17.Bxd5 Nxd5 18.Bxe7 Nxe7 19.Qb3 Bc6 20.Nxc6 bxc6 21.Re5 Qb6 22.Qc2 Rfd8 23.Ne2 Rd5 24.Rxd5 cxd5 25.Qd2 Nf5 26.b3 h5 27.h3 h4 28.Qd3 Rc6 29.Kf1 g6 30.Qb1 Qb4 31.Kg1 a5 32.Qb2 a4 33.Qd2 Qxd2 34.Rxd2 axb3 35.axb3 Rb6 36.Rd3 Ra6 37.g4 hxg3 38.fxg3 Ra2 39.Nc3 Rc2 40.Nd1 Ne7 41.Nc3 Rc1+ 42.Kf2 Nc6 43.Nd1 Rb1 44.Ke2 Rxb3 45.Ke3 Rb4 46.Nc3 Ne7 47.Ne2 Nf5+ 48.Kf2 g5 49.g4 Nd6 50.Ng1 Ne4+ 51.Kf1 Rb1+ 52.Kg2 Rb2+ 53.Kf1 Rf2+ 54.Ke1 Ra2 55.Kf1 Kg7 56.Re3 Kg6 57.Rd3 f6 58.Re3 Kf7 59.Rd3 Ke7 60.Re3 Kd6 61.Rd3 Rf2+ 62.Ke1 Rg2 63.Kf1 Ra2 64.Re3 e5 65.Rd3 exd4 66.Rxd4 Kc5 67.Rd1 d4 68.Rc1+ Kd5 0-1

=== Game 11: Capablanca–Lasker 1-0 ===
Queen's Gambit Declined
1.d4 d5 2.Nf3 e6 3.c4 Nf6 4.Bg5 Nbd7 5.e3 Be7 6.Nc3 O-O 7.Rc1 Re8 8.Qc2 c6 9.Bd3 dxc4 10.Bxc4 Nd5 11.Bxe7 Rxe7 12.O-O Nf8 13.Rfd1 Bd7 14.e4 Nb6 15.Bf1 Rc8 16.b4 Be8 17.Qb3 Rec7 18.a4 Ng6 19.a5 Nd7 20.e5 b6 21.Ne4 Rb8 22.Qc3 Nf4 23.Nd6 Nd5 24.Qa3 f6 25.Nxe8 Qxe8 26.exf6 gxf6 27.b5 Rbc8 28.bxc6 Rxc6 29.Rxc6 Rxc6 30.axb6 axb6 31.Re1 Qc8 32.Nd2 Nf8 33.Ne4 Qd8 34.h4 Rc7 35.Qb3 Rg7 36.g3 Ra7 37.Bc4 Ra5 38.Nc3 Nxc3 39.Qxc3 Kf7 40.Qe3 Qd6 41.Qe4 Ra4 42.Qb7+ Kg6 43.Qc8 Qb4 44.Rc1 Qe7 45.Bd3+ Kh6 46.Rc7 Ra1+ 47.Kg2 Qd6 48.Qxf8+ 1-0

=== Game 12: Lasker–Capablanca ½-½ ===
Ruy Lopez, Berlin Defense
1.e4 e5 2.Nf3 Nc6 3.Bb5 Nf6 4.O-O d6 5.d4 Bd7 6.Nc3 Be7 7.Re1 exd4 8.Nxd4 O-O 9.Bf1 Re8 10.f3 Bf8 11.Bg5 h6 12.Bh4 g6 13.Nd5 Bg7 14.Nb5 g5 15.Ndxc7 gxh4 16.Nxa8 Qxa8 17.Nc7 Qd8 18.Nxe8 Nxe8 19.Rb1 Be6 20.c3 Bxa2 21.Ra1 Be6 22.Qd2 a6 23.Qf2 h5 24.f4 Bh6 25.Be2 Nf6 26.Qxh4 Nxe4 27.Qxd8+ Nxd8 28.Bxa6 d5 29.Be2 Bxf4 30.Bxh5 Bc7 31.Rad1 ½-½

=== Game 13: Capablanca–Lasker ½-½ ===
Queen's Gambit Declined
1.d4 d5 2.Nf3 Nf6 3.c4 e6 4.Bg5 Be7 5.e3 Nbd7 6.Nc3 O-O 7.Rc1 Re8 8.Qc2 h6 9.Bh4 c5 10.cxd5 Nxd5 11.Bxe7 Nxe7 12.dxc5 Nxc5 13.Bb5 Bd7 14.O-O Qb6 15.Bxd7 Nxd7 16.Rfd1 Red8 17.h3 Rac8 18.Qa4 Nc6 19.Qb5 a6 20.Qxb6 Nxb6 21.Rxd8+ Nxd8 22.Ne2 Kf8 23.Rxc8 Nxc8 ½-½

=== Game 14: Lasker–Capablanca 0-1 ===
Ruy Lopez, Berlin Defense
1.e4 e5 2.Nf3 Nc6 3.Bb5 Nf6 4.O-O d6 5.d4 Bd7 6.Nc3 Be7 7.Bxc6 Bxc6 8.Qd3 exd4 9.Nxd4 Bd7 10.Bg5 O-O 11.Rae1 h6 12.Bh4 Nh7 13.Bxe7 Qxe7 14.Nd5 Qd8 15.c4 Re8 16.f4 c6 17.Nc3 Qb6 18.b3 Rad8 19.Kh1 Nf6 20.h3 Bc8 21.Rd1 Re7 22.Rfe1 Rde8 23.Re2 Qa5 24.Rf1 Qh5 25.Kg1 a6 26.Rff2 Qg6 27.Rf3 Qh5 28.f5 Qh4 29.Kh2 Ng4+ 30.Kh1 Ne5 31.Qd2 Nxf3 32.Nxf3 Qf6 33.a4 g6 34.fxg6 fxg6 35.Re3 Bf5 36.Qd3 g5 37.Nd2 Bg6 38.b4 Qe6 39.b5 axb5 40.axb5 Ra8 41.Qb1 Qe5 42.Qe1 Kh7 43.bxc6 bxc6 44.Qg3 Qxg3 45.Rxg3 Ra3 46.Kh2 Rb7 47.c5 dxc5 48.Nc4 Ra1 49.Ne5 Rc1 50.h4 Re7 51.Nxc6 Re6 52.Nd8 gxh4 53.Rd3 Rf6 54.Rd7+ Kh8 55.Nd5 Rff1 56.Kh3 Bxe4 0-1
