= Interregnum of World Chess Champions =

Period in chess history (1946–1948)

The Interregnum of World Chess Champions lasted from the death of incumbent World Chess Champion Alexander Alekhine on 24 March 1946, until Mikhail Botvinnik won a specially organized championship tournament to succeed him on 17 May 1948.

== History ==
Following Alekhine's sudden death in 1946 while living in exile in Portugal, the title of World Chess Champion became vacant for the first time in its 60-year history. There was no obvious means for a new player to succeed him, as the title had always been decided by matches organized between a challenger and the incumbent champion, and sponsored by willing patrons. Many respected players and commentators offered different solutions. It was proposed that Max Euwe should be declared champion, because he was the most recent living player to have won a championship match. Also put forward was Mikhail Botvinnik, whom Alekhine had accepted a challenge from prior to his death. Alternatively, Euwe and Botvinnik could play a match for the title. The International Chess Federation (FIDE) had considerable difficulties organizing early discussions on how to end the interregnum. Monetary and logistical problems following the end of World War II prevented many countries from sending representatives, with the most prominent among them being the Soviet Union. The shortage of clear information resulted in otherwise responsible magazines publishing rumors and speculation, which only made the situation more confused.

FIDE ultimately favored a round-robin tournament including the world's top players to determine the World Championship. Their first proposal in July 1946 selected Euwe, Botvinnik, Paul Keres, Vasily Smyslov, Reuben Fine, Samuel Reshevsky, as well as one of the winners of tournaments to be held later that year in Groningen and Prague. Most of these candidates had participated in the 1938 AVRO tournament, which had originally been conceived as a means for FIDE to involve itself in organizing the championship. The proposal also called for a three-year championship cycle going forward, with a challenger selected via a series of Zonal and Interzonal tournaments.

Some writers suggest that Euwe had actually been declared World Champion at the 1947 FIDE congress on a vote that took place just prior to the arrival of the Soviet delegation. The Soviet Union supported the proposal for a tournament to decide the title, so Euwe was deposed after a two-hour reign as World Champion. Earlier in 1947, Botvinnik had written an article in which he stated the need to prevent champions from avoiding the strongest challengers and to make sure that the financial arrangements were satisfactory for both players and whoever was hosting the events. He supported the proposal that the vacant world championship should be filled by the winner of a multi-round all-play-all tournament and proposed a system for selecting future challengers that was very like FIDE's 1946 proposals and the system that operated from 1948 to 1963. The proposed tournament was very similar in concept to the 1938 AVRO tournament, whose purpose had been to decide who should challenge Alekhine for the title.

The 1948 World Chess Championship took place in 1948, the first half in The Hague and the second in Moscow. Botvinnik won by scoring 14 points out of 20 and making a plus score against each of the other players. Botvinnik secured victory on May 9, prior to the final round on May 17. Following Botvinnik's victory, the World Chess Championship would be organized exclusively under FIDE's auspices for the next 45 years.

The Interregnum was a unique period in modern chess history. Although there have been other discontinuities in the chain of succession, such as Anatoly Karpov not defeating Bobby Fischer, and Ding Liren not defeating Magnus Carlsen, as well as a period where the title was contested between rival claimants, the Interregnum remains the only period in modern chess history where there was no champion.

== Women ==
There was a similar interregnum of the Women's World Chess Championship, between Vera Menchik's death in 1944 and Lyudmila Rudenko winning the championship in 1950.
