= World Chess Championship 1910 (Lasker–Janowski) =

	Defending champion	Challenger
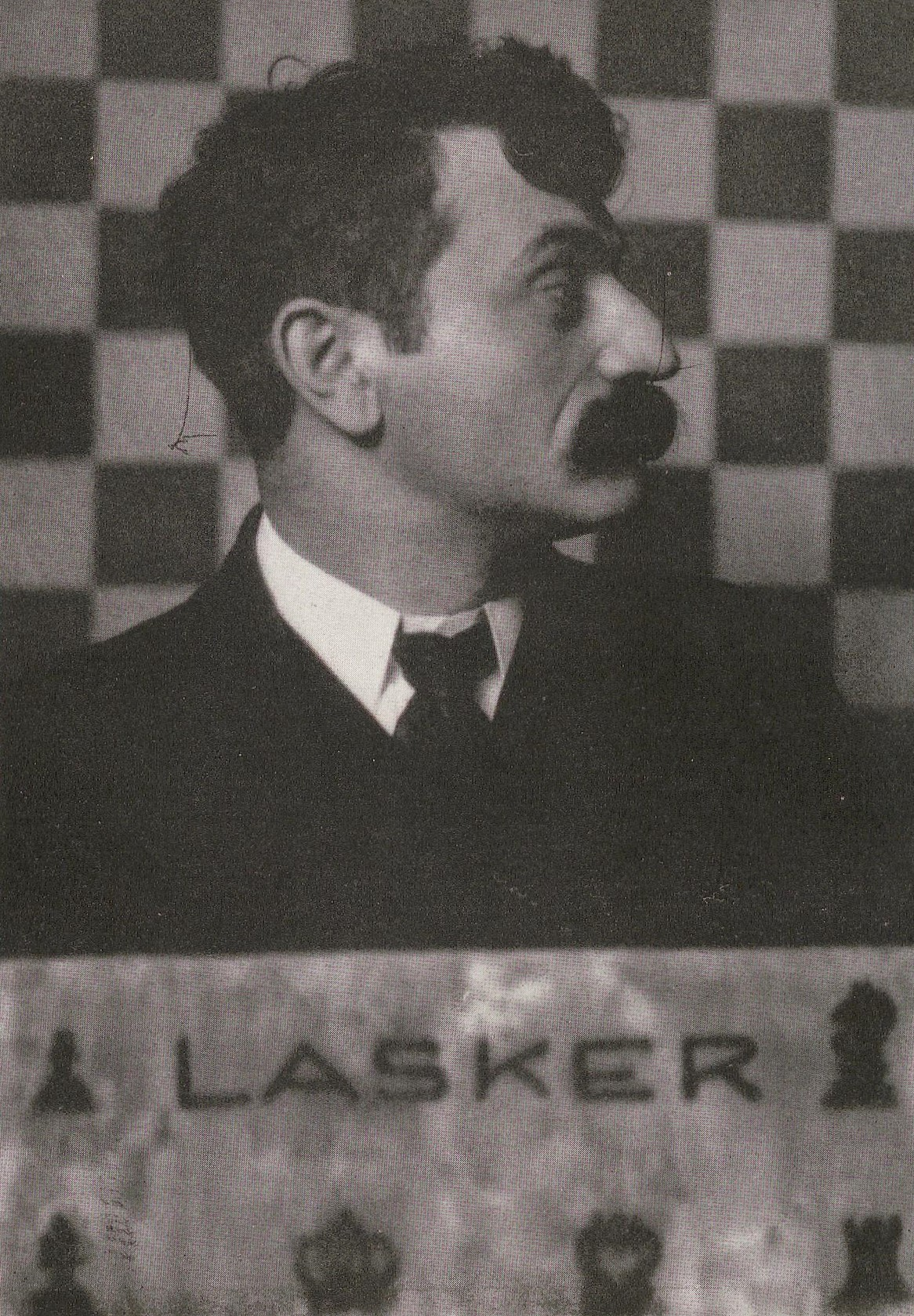
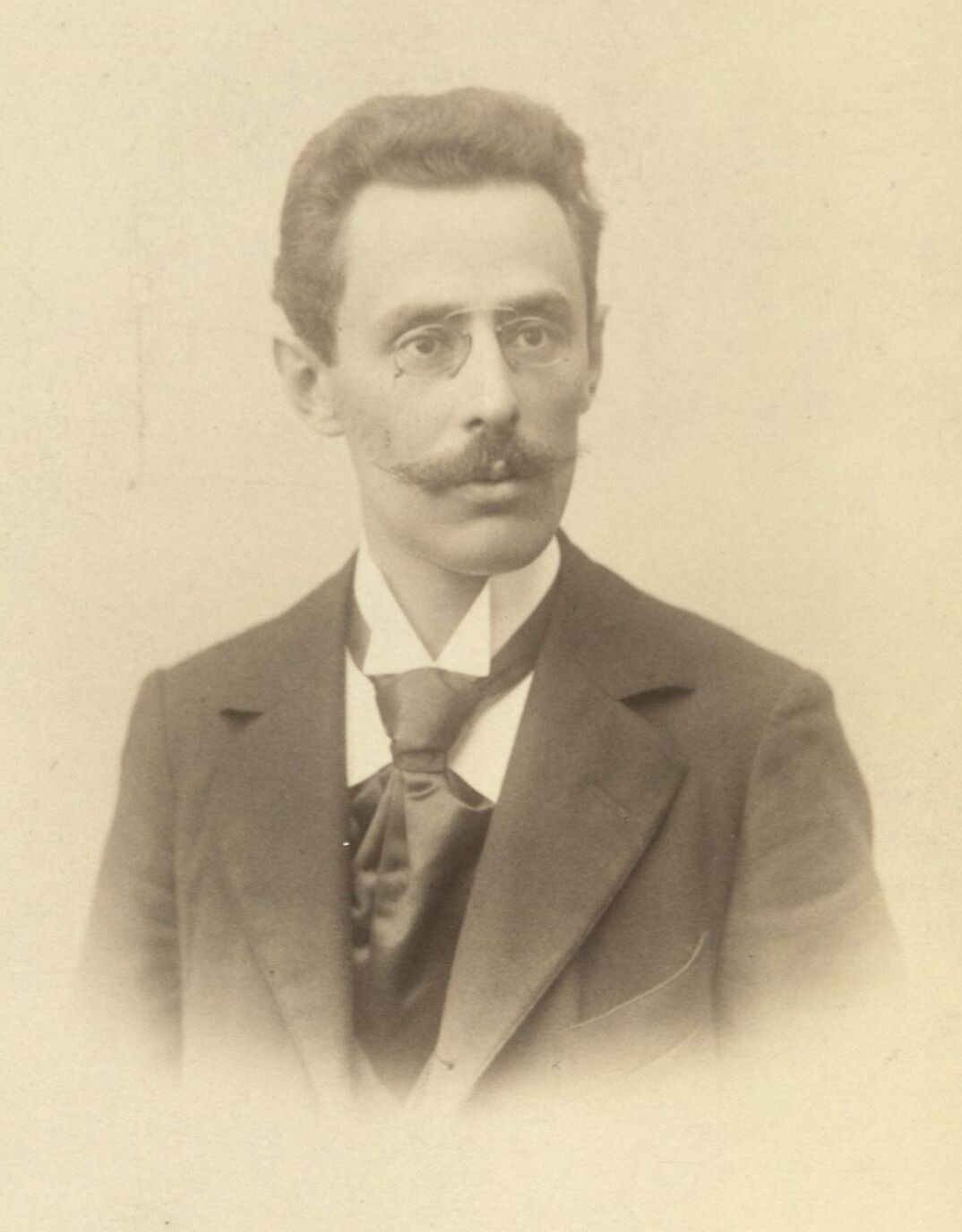
	Emanuel Lasker	David Janowski
	(German Empire) Emanuel Lasker	(France) David Janowski
9½	Scores	1½
	Born 24 December 1868; 41 years old	Born 25 May 1868; 42 years old

From November 8 to December 8, 1910, a World Chess Championship match was played in Berlin between the champion Emanuel Lasker and the challenger David Janowski. It was the second world championship match played in 1910, following Lasker's title defense against Carl Schlechter earlier that year. Lasker successfully defended his title, with the score—Lasker winning 8 games, Janowski winning none, and 3 draws—being the most one-sided in World Chess Championship history.

== Background ==
Lasker and Janowski played two exhibition matches in 1909, the first drawn (+2 -2) and the second won convincingly by Lasker (+7 =2 -1). The longer 1909 match has sometimes been called a world championship match, but research by Edward Winter indicates that the title was not at stake.

== Results ==
The first player to win eight games would be World Champion.

World Chess Championship Match Nov-Dec 1910
	1	2	3	4	5	6	7	8	9	10	11	Wins	Total
Emanuel Lasker (Germany)	1	=	=	1	1	=	1	1	1	1	1	8	9½
David Janowski (France)	0	=	=	0	0	=	0	0	0	0	0	0	1½

Lasker retained the title in the most one-sided World Championship of all time.
