= 2022 United States Chess Championship =

2022 Chess tournament

United States Championship 2022
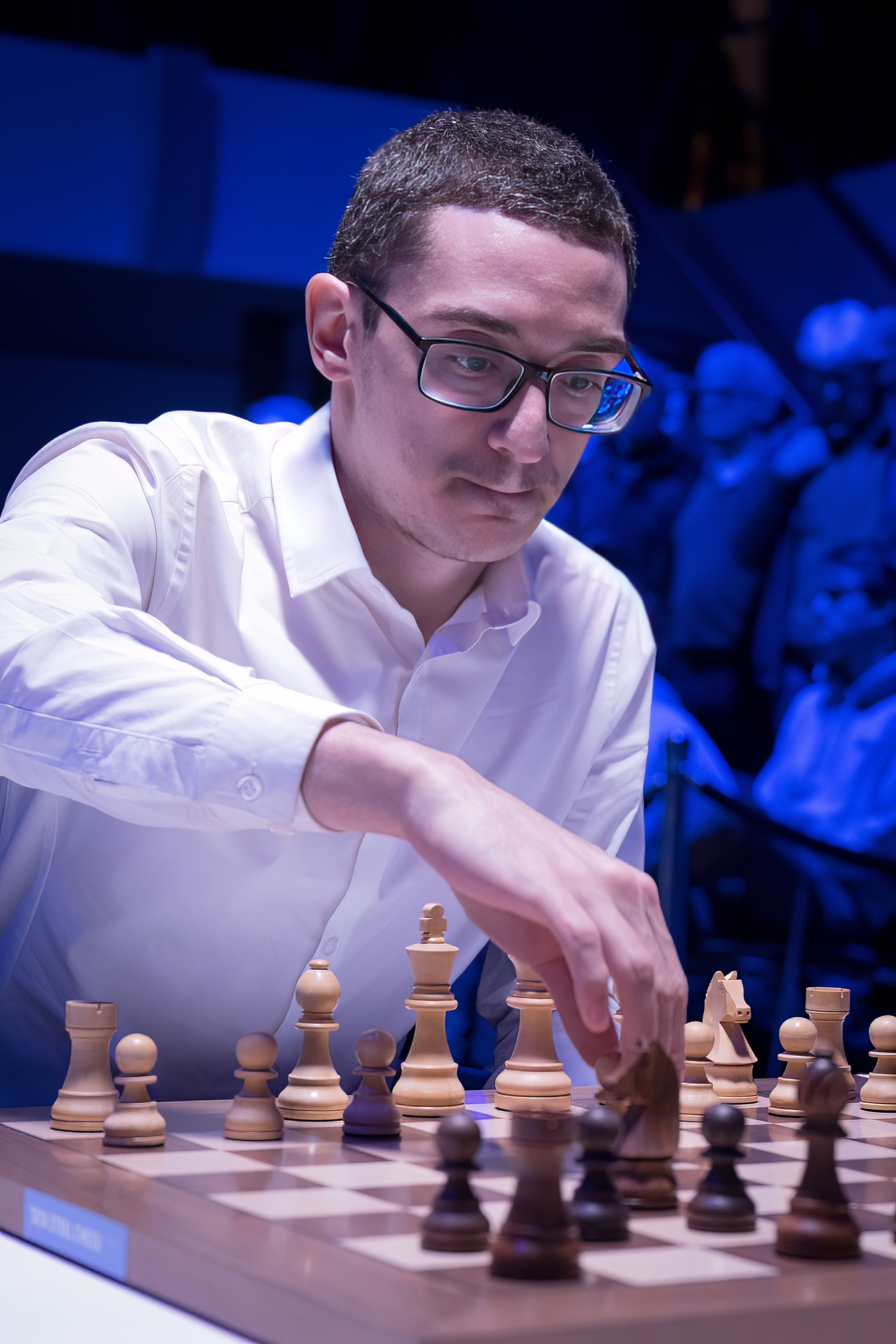
- Fabiano Caruana, the winner of the tournament, earned the title as the United States Chess Champion
- Venue: Saint Louis Chess Club
- Location: St. Louis, Missouri
- Dates: October 4 - October 21, 2022
- Competitors: 14
- Winning score: 8.5 points of 13
- Total prize money: $250,000

Champion
- (United States) Fabiano Caruana

The 2022 edition of the United States Chess Championship took place at the Saint Louis Chess Club in St. Louis, Missouri from October 4 to October 21, 2022. As with every United States Chess Championship tournament since 2014, it was a round-robin tournament. Fourteen players were invited to compete. Besides the reigning US champion, these included the winners of the US Open Chess Championship, the US Junior Championship, and the US Senior Open Championship. The remaining players were chosen by highest invitational rating, or were selected by the United States Chess Federation (USCF) as wildcards.

The fourteen qualifiers were Fabiano Caruana, Ray Robson, Awonder Liang, Leinier Domínguez, Jeffery Xiong, Wesley So, Samuel Sevian, Samuel Shankland, Hans Niemann, Levon Aronian, Dariusz Swiercz, Christopher Yoo, Aleksandr Lenderman and Elshan Moradi, all of whom are Grandmasters. Fabiano Caruana won the tournament without losing a game. This was his second title.

== Participants ==
All statistics as of October 2022.

Qualification method	Player	Age	Rating	World ranking
The United States Chess Championship is an invitational classical chess tournament.	(United States) Fabiano Caruana	30	2763	8
The United States Chess Championship is an invitational classical chess tournament.	(United States) Ray Robson	27	2690	47
The United States Chess Championship is an invitational classical chess tournament.	(United States) Awonder Liang	19	2608	>100
The United States Chess Championship is an invitational classical chess tournament.	(United States) Leinier Domínguez	39	2747	12
The United States Chess Championship is an invitational classical chess tournament.	(United States) Jeffery Xiong	21	2690	47
The United States Chess Championship is an invitational classical chess tournament.	(United States) Wesley So (defending champion)	28	2774	5
The United States Chess Championship is an invitational classical chess tournament.	(United States) Samuel Sevian	21	2684	56
The United States Chess Championship is an invitational classical chess tournament.	(United States) Sam Shankland	31	2712	32
The United States Chess Championship is an invitational classical chess tournament.	(United States) Hans Niemann	19	2699	40
The United States Chess Championship is an invitational classical chess tournament.	(United States) Levon Aronian	39	2755	10
The United States Chess Championship is an invitational classical chess tournament.	(United States) Dariusz Świercz	28	2652	94
The United States Chess Championship is an invitational classical chess tournament.	(United States) Christopher Yoo	15	2563	>100
The United States Chess Championship is an invitational classical chess tournament.	(United States) Aleksandr Lenderman	32	2535	>100
The United States Chess Championship is an invitational classical chess tournament.	(United States) Elshan Moradi	36	2534	>100

== Organization ==
The tournament was a fourteen-player, round-robin tournament, meaning there were 14 rounds with each player facing the others once. The tournament winner became the United States Chess Champion.

=== Regulations ===
- The time control is 90 minutes for the first 40 moves, followed by 30 minutes for the rest of the game. There is a 30-second increment starting on move one.
- Players are not allowed to draw by agreement.
- The event is a 14-player round-robin, where every player plays once against every other player on the field.
- Players get 1 point for a win, 0.5 points for a draw, and 0 points for a loss.
- The player with the most points at the end of the last round wins the event.

=== Tie breaks ===
While there was no tie for first place, such a situation would have been addressed as follows:

If two players tie for first a two-game 10+2 rapid match will take place. If there remains a tie, a single armageddon game will occur.

If three or four players tie for first a single round-robin in the 10+2 rapid time control will take place

If two players remain tied, they contest a two-game 3+2 blitz match. If the tie persists, an armageddon game decides the winner.

If three or more players remain tied, they contest a 3+2 round-robin.

If more than four players tie for first players will contest a 3+2 round-robin. If the round-robin ends in a tie, a series of armageddon games decide the winner.

=== Prize money ===
The event features a $250,000 prize fund, distributed as follows:

Place	Cash prize (USD)
1st	$60,000
2nd	$45,000
3rd	$35,000
4th	$25,000
5th	$20,000
6th	$14,000
7th	$11,000
8th	$10,000
9th	$9,000
10th	$8,000
11th	$7,000
12th	$6,500
13th	$6,000
14th	$5,500

== Results ==
=== Standings ===
Fabiano Caruana won the tournament with Ray Robson as the runner-up.

#	Player	Rating	1	2	3	4	5	6	7	8	9	10	11	12	13	14	Points
1	(United States) Fabiano Caruana	2763	—	½	½	½	½	½	½	½	1	½	1	½	1	1	8.5
2	(United States) Ray Robson	2690	½	—	½	½	½	1	½	½	1	½	½	½	½	1	8
3	(United States) Awonder Liang	2608	½	½	—	½	½	½	½	½	½	1	1	½	1	0	7.5
4	(United States) Leinier Domínguez	2747	½	½	½	—	½	½	½	½	½	½	½	1	½	1	7.5
5	(United States) Jeffery Xiong	2690	½	½	½	½	—	½	½	½	½	½	½	1	½	½	7
6	(United States) Wesley So (defending champion)	2774	½	0	½	½	½	—	½	1	½	½	½	0	1	1	7
7	(United States) Samuel Sevian	2684	½	½	½	½	½	½	—	½	0	½	1	½	½	1	7
8	(United States) Sam Shankland	2712	½	½	½	½	½	0	½	—	½	½	½	1	½	1	7
9	(United States) Hans Niemann	2699	0	0	½	½	½	½	1	½	—	½	0	1	1	1	7
10	(United States) Levon Aronian	2755	½	½	0	½	½	½	½	½	½	—	0	½	½	1	6
11	(United States) Dariusz Świercz	2652	0	½	0	½	½	½	0	½	1	1	—	0	½	½	5.5
12	(United States) Christopher Yoo	2563	½	½	½	0	0	1	½	0	0	½	1	—	0	1	5.5
13	(United States) Aleksandr Lenderman	2535	0	½	0	½	½	0	½	½	0	½	½	1	—	1	5.5
14	(United States) Elshan Moradi	2534	0	0	1	0	½	0	0	0	0	0	½	0	0	—	2
