= 2023 United States Chess Championship =

2023 Chess tournament

United States Championship 2023
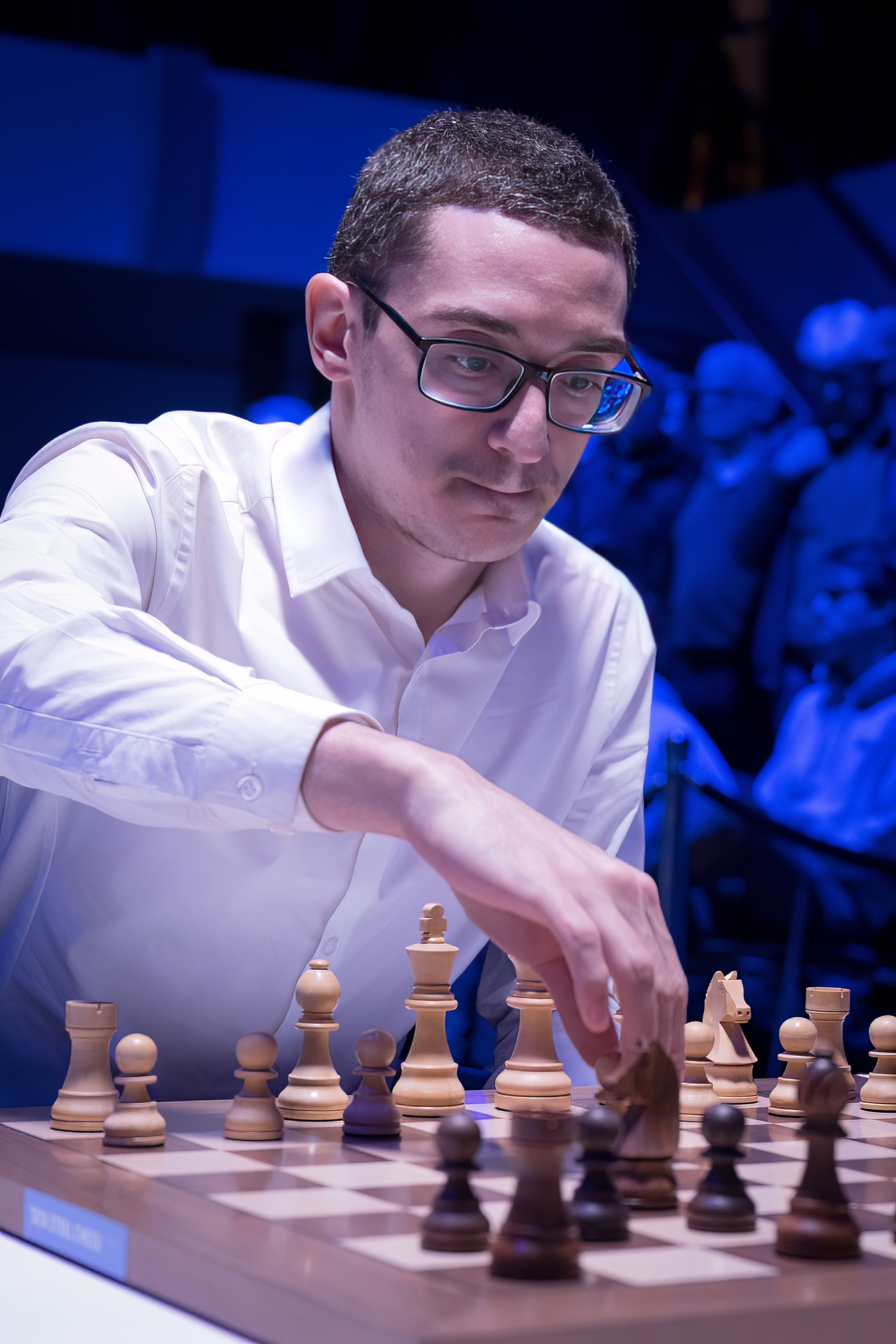
- Fabiano Caruana, the winner of the tournament, maintained his title as the United States Chess Champion
- Venue: Saint Louis Chess Club
- Location: St. Louis, Missouri
- Dates: October 4–19, 2023
- Competitors: 12
- Winning score: 8 points of 11
- Total prize money: $250,000

Champion
- (United States) Fabiano Caruana

The 2023 edition of the United States Chess Championship took place at the Saint Louis Chess Club in St. Louis, Missouri from October 4 to October 19, 2023. As with every United States Chess Championship tournament since 2014, it was a round-robin tournament. Twelve players were invited to compete. Besides the reigning US champion, these included the winners of the US Open Chess Championship, the US Junior Championship, and the US Senior Open Championship. The remaining players were chosen by highest invitational rating, or were selected by the United States Chess Federation (USCF) as wildcards.

The twelve qualifiers were Fabiano Caruana, Wesley So, Leinier Domínguez, Abhimanyu Mishra, Hans Niemann, Samuel Sevian, Ray Robson, Levon Aronian, Sam Shankland, Jeffery Xiong, Dariusz Świercz and Andrew Tang, all of whom are grandmasters. Fabiano Caruana won the tournament without losing a game. This was his second consecutive title.

== Participants ==
All statistics as of October 2023.

Participants
Player	Age	Rating	World ranking
(United States) Fabiano Caruana (defending champion)	31	2786	2
(United States) Wesley So	29	2753	10
(United States) Leinier Domínguez	40	2745	13
(United States) Abhimanyu Mishra	14	2592	>100
(United States) Hans Niemann	20	2667	70
(United States) Samuel Sevian	22	2698	37
(United States) Ray Robson	28	2699	36
(United States) Levon Aronian	40	2742	15
(United States) Sam Shankland	32	2698	38
(United States) Jeffery Xiong	22	2693	45
(United States) Dariusz Świercz	29	2620	>100
(United States) Andrew Tang	23	2496	>100

== Organization ==
The tournament was a twelve-player, round-robin tournament, meaning there were 11 rounds with each player facing the others once. The tournament winner became the United States Chess Champion.

=== Regulations ===
- The time control is 90 minutes for the first 40 moves, followed by 30 minutes for the rest of the game. There is a 30-second increment starting on move one.
- Players are not allowed to draw by agreement.
- The event is a 12-player round-robin, where every player plays once against every other player on the field.
- Players get 1 point for a win, 0.5 points for a draw, and 0 points for a loss.
- The player with the most points at the end of the last round wins the event.

=== Tie breaks ===
While there was no tie for first place, such a situation would have been addressed as follows:

If two players tie for first a two-game 10+2 rapid match will take place. If there remains a tie, a single armageddon game will occur.

If three or four players tie for first a single round-robin in the 10+2 rapid time control will take place

If two players remain tied, they contest a two-game 3+2 blitz match. If the tie persists, an armageddon game decides the winner.

If three or more players remain tied, they contest a 3+2 round-robin.

If more than four players tie for first players will contest a 3+2 round-robin. If the round-robin ends in a tie, a series of armageddon games decide the winner.

=== Prize money ===
The event features a $250,000 prize fund, distributed as follows:

Place	Cash prize (USD)
1st	$60,000
2nd	$45,000
3rd	$35,000
4th	$25,000
5th	$20,000
6th	$14,000
7th	$11,000
8th	$10,000
9th	$9,000
10th	$8,000
11th	$7,000
12th	$6,000

== Results ==
=== Standings ===
Fabiano Caruana won the tournament with ex-champion Wesley So as the runner-up.

#	Player	Rating	1	2	3	4	5	6	7	8	9	10	11	12	Points
1	(United States) Fabiano Caruana (defending champion)	2786	—	½	½	1	1	½	½	½	½	1	1	1	8
2	(United States) Wesley So	2753	½	—	½	1	½	½	1	½	½	½	½	½	6.5
3	(United States) Leinier Domínguez	2745	½	½	—	½	½	½	½	½	1	½	½	1	6.5
4	(United States) Abhimanyu Mishra	2592	0	0	½	—	0	1	1	1	1	½	½	1	6.5
5	(United States) Hans Niemann	2667	0	½	½	1	—	1	0	1	0	½	½	½	5.5
6	(United States) Samuel Sevian	2698	½	½	½	0	0	—	1	½	½	½	½	1	5.5
7	(United States) Ray Robson	2699	½	0	½	0	1	0	—	½	½	1	1	½	5.5
8	(United States) Levon Aronian	2742	½	½	½	0	0	½	½	—	1	½	½	½	5
9	(United States) Sam Shankland	2698	½	½	0	0	1	½	½	0	—	½	½	½	4.5
10	(United States) Jeffery Xiong	2693	0	½	½	½	½	½	0	½	½	—	½	½	4.5
11	(United States) Dariusz Świercz	2620	0	½	½	½	½	½	0	½	½	½	—	0	4
12	(United States) Andrew Tang	2496	0	½	0	0	½	0	½	½	½	½	1	—	4
