= 2021 United States Chess Championship =

2021 Chess tournament

United States Championship 2021
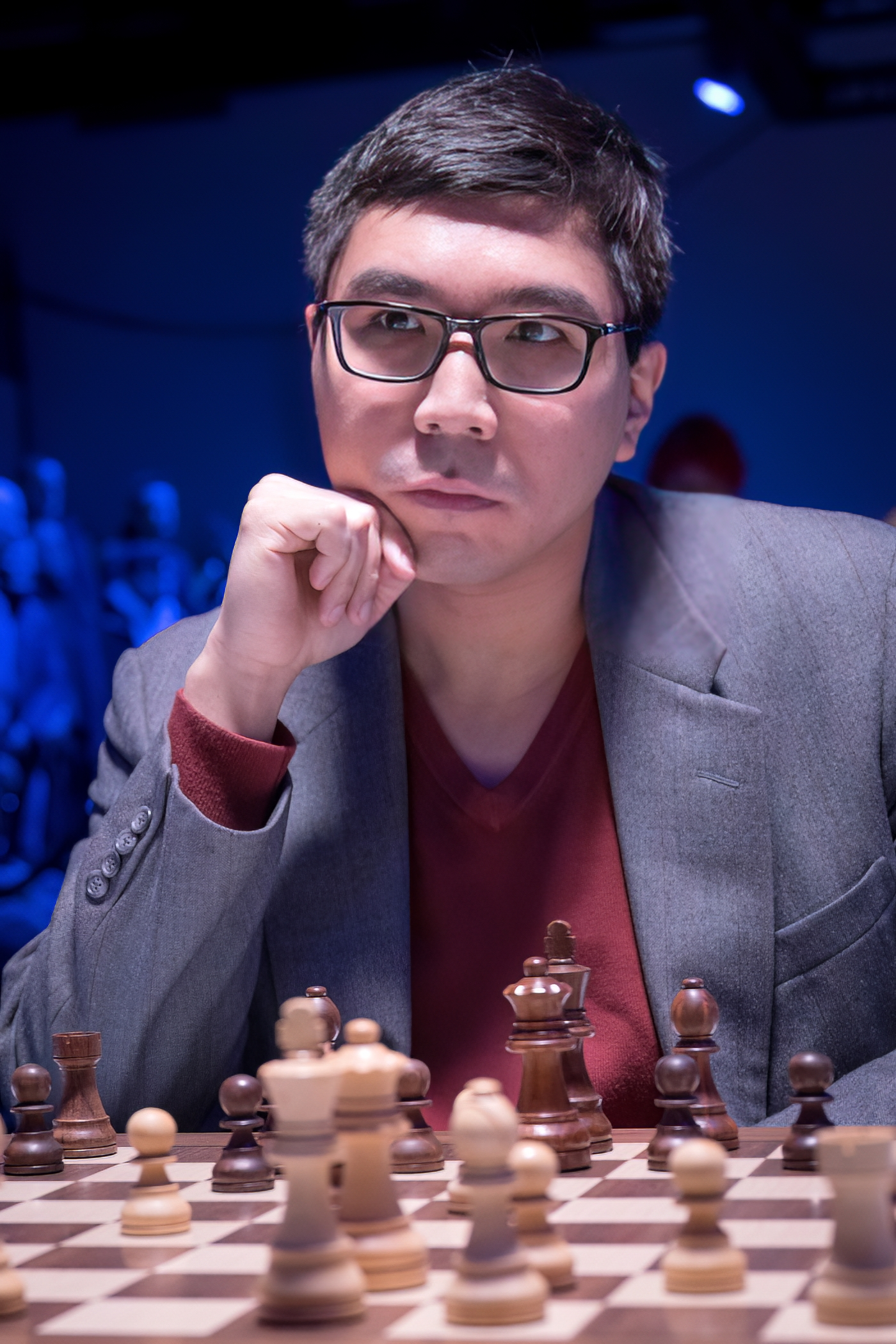
- Wesley So, the winner of the tournament, maintained the title as the United States Chess Champion
- Venue: Saint Louis Chess Club
- Location: St. Louis, Missouri
- Dates: October 6 - October 20, 2021
- Competitors: 12
- Winning score: 6.5 points out of 11
- Total prize money: $194,000

Champion
- (United States) Wesley So

The 2021 edition of the United States Chess Championship took place at the Saint Louis Chess Club in St. Louis, Missouri from October 6 to October 20, 2021. As with every United States Chess Championship tournament since 2014, it was a round-robin tournament. Twelve players were invited to compete. Besides the reigning US champion, these included the winners of the US Open Chess Championship, the US Junior Championship, and the US Senior Open Championship. The remaining players were chosen by highest invitational rating, or were selected by the United States Chess Federation (USCF) as wildcards.

The fourteen qualifiers were Fabiano Caruana, Ray Robson, John M. Burke, Leinier Domínguez, Jeffery Xiong, Wesley So, Samuel Sevian, Samuel Shankland, Daniel Naroditsky, Lázaro Bruzón, Dariusz Swiercz and Aleksandr Lenderman, all of whom are Grandmasters. Wesley So won the tournament without losing a game. This was his third title.

== Participants ==
All statistics as of October 2021.

Qualification method	Player	Age	Rating	World ranking
The United States Chess Championship is an invitational classical chess tournament.	(United States) Fabiano Caruana	28	2800	2
The United States Chess Championship is an invitational classical chess tournament.	(United States) Wesley So (defending champion)	26	2778	6
The United States Chess Championship is an invitational classical chess tournament.	(United States) Samuel Sevian	20	2654	91
The United States Chess Championship is an invitational classical chess tournament.	(United States) Leinier Domínguez	38	2760	14
The United States Chess Championship is an invitational classical chess tournament.	(United States) Aleksandr Lenderman	31	2607	>100
The United States Chess Championship is an invitational classical chess tournament.	(United States) Ray Robson	21	2669	62
The United States Chess Championship is an invitational classical chess tournament.	(United States) Sam Shankland	30	2714	28
The United States Chess Championship is an invitational classical chess tournament.	(United States) John M. Burke	19	2554	>100
The United States Chess Championship is an invitational classical chess tournament.	(United States) Dariusz Świercz	27	2647	99
The United States Chess Championship is an invitational classical chess tournament.	(United States) Daniel Naroditsky	25	2623	>100
The United States Chess Championship is an invitational classical chess tournament.	(United States) Jeffery Xiong	20	2700	38
The United States Chess Championship is an invitational classical chess tournament.	(United States) Lázaro Bruzón	38	2645	>100

== Organization ==
The tournament was a twelve-player, round-robin tournament, meaning there were 12 rounds with each player facing the others once. The tournament winner became the United States Chess Champion.

=== Regulations ===
- The time control is 90 minutes for the first 40 moves, followed by 30 minutes for the rest of the game. There is a 30-second increment starting on move one.
- Players are not allowed to draw by agreement.
- The event is a 12-player round-robin, where every player plays once against every other player on the field.
- Players get 1 point for a win, 0.5 points for a draw, and 0 points for a loss.
- The player with the most points at the end of the last round wins the event.

=== Tie breaks ===
While there was no tie for first place, such a situation would have been addressed as follows:

If two players tie for first a two-game 10+2 rapid match will take place. If there remains a tie, a single armageddon game will occur.

If three or four players tie for first a single round-robin in the 10+2 rapid time control will take place

If two players remain tied, they contest a two-game 3+2 blitz match. If the tie persists, an armageddon game decides the winner.

If three or more players remain tied, they contest a 3+2 round-robin.

If more than four players tie for first players will contest a 3+2 round-robin. If the round-robin ends in a tie, a series of armageddon games decide the winner.

=== Prize money ===
The event features a $194,000 prize fund, distributed as follows:

Place	Cash prize (USD)
1st	$50,000
2nd	$35,000
3rd	$25,000
4th	$20,000
5th	$15,000
6th	$10,000
7th	$9,000
8th	$8,000
9th	$7,000
10th	$6,000
11th	$5,000
12th	$4,000

== Results ==
=== Standings ===
Fabiano Caruana, Wesley So and Samuel Sevian tied for first place and will move into tiebreaks under a single round-robin in the 10+2 rapid time control.

#	Player	Rating	1	2	3	4	5	6	7	8	9	10	11	12	Points
1	(United States) Fabiano Caruana	2800	—	½	0	½	1	1	½	1	1	0	½	½	6.5
2	(United States) Wesley So (defending champion)	2778	½	—	½	½	½	½	½	1	1	½	½	½	6.5
3	(United States) Samuel Sevian	2654	1	½	—	½	0	½	½	½	½	½	1	1	6.5
4	(United States) Leinier Domínguez	2760	½	½	½	—	½	½	1	½	½	½	½	½	6
5	(United States) Aleksandr Lenderman	2607	0	½	1	½	—	½	½	½	½	1	½	½	6
6	(United States) Ray Robson	2669	0	½	½	½	½	—	½	½	½	1	1	½	6
7	(United States) Sam Shankland	2714	½	½	½	0	½	½	—	1	½	1	0	½	5.5
8	(United States) John M. Burke	2554	0	0	½	½	½	½	0	—	1	½	1	1	5
9	(United States) Dariusz Świercz	2647	0	0	½	½	½	½	½	0	—	1	½	1	5
10	(United States) Daniel Naroditsky	2623	1	½	½	½	0	0	0	½	0	—	1	½	4.5
11	(United States) Jeffery Xiong	2700	½	½	0	½	½	0	1	0	½	0	—	1	4.5
12	(United States) Lázaro Bruzón	2645	½	½	0	½	½	½	½	½	0	½	0	—	4

=== Tiebreaks ===
Wesley So won the tournament after beating both Fabiano Caruana and Samuel Sevian in the tiebreaks. Fabiano Caruana was the runner-up.

#	Player	Rating	1	2	3	Points
1	(United States) Wesley So (defending champion)	2778	—	1	1	2
2	(United States) Fabiano Caruana	2800	0	—	1	1
3	(United States) Samuel Sevian	2654	0	0	—	0
