= Nick de Firmian =

American chess grandmaster (born 1957)

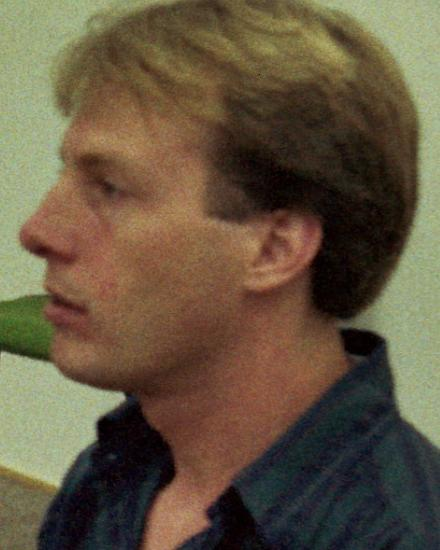
- De Firmian at the 27th Chess Olympiad, 1986

Personal information
- Born: Nicholas Ernest de Firmian; July 26, 1957 (age 69) Fresno, California, U.S.

Chess career
- Country: United States
- Title: Grandmaster (1985)
- Peak rating: 2610 (January 1999)
- Peak ranking: No. 25 (July 1989)

Nicholas Ernest de Firmian (born July 26, 1957) is an American chess player who received the FIDE title of Grandmaster (GM) in 1985. He is a three-time U.S. chess champion, winning in 1987 (with Joel Benjamin), 1995, and 1998. He also tied for first in 2002, but Larry Christiansen won the playoff. He is also a chess writer, most famous for his work in writing the 13th, 14th, and 15th editions of the important chess opening treatise Modern Chess Openings. He was born in Fresno, California.

== Chess career ==
De Firmian has represented the United States at several Interzonals and played on the United States Olympiad teams of 1980, 1984, 1986, 1988, 1990, 1996, 1998, and 2000. De Firmian earned the International Master title in 1979 and the GM title in 1985. Beginning in the 1990s, he lived for many years in Denmark. He currently resides in California.

He won the 1983 Canadian Open Chess Championship. In 1986, he won the World Open and the first prize of $21,000, at that time a record for a Swiss system tournament. In 1988, he lost the final-round game at the World Open to GM Maxim Dlugy, still winning $14,000 for second place.

De Firmian was a founding member of Prochess, a grandmaster advocacy group dedicated to promoting chess in the United States. He has a degree in physics from the University of California, Berkeley.

De Firmian is a noted expert on chess openings and in 1990 he revised Modern Chess Openings, 13th edition (MCO-13). In 1999 he wrote the 14th edition of Modern Chess Openings (MCO-14), which, along with Nunn's Chess Openings (NCO), is considered an outstanding single volume opening reference in English. He also helped prepare the chess opening book for the IBM Deep Blue team for its successful 1997 match with Garry Kasparov.

In 2000, de Firmian tied for first place at the U.S. Masters Chess Championship.

In 2006 he revised and expanded the classic 1921 book Chess Fundamentals, by José Capablanca. The edition was harshly criticized by chess historian Edward Winter, who claimed that de Firmian "destroyed" the book by changing Capablanca's writing and removing games from previous editions to include new games not played by Capablanca. De Firmian also wrote the 15th edition of MCO, published in April 2008.

c. 2012, de Firmian began a scholastic chess program with the Mechanics Institute in San Francisco.

== Publications ==
- Nick de Firmian; Korn, Walter (1990). Modern Chess Openings (13 ed.). A. & C. Black.
- Nick de Firmian (1999). Modern Chess Openings (14 ed.). Random House. ISBN 0-8129-3084-3.
- Nick de Firmian; Fedorowicz, John (2004). The English Attack. Sterling. ISBN 978-0-945806-14-1.
- José Capablanca and Nick de Firmian (2006) [1921]. Chess Fundamentals (Completely Revised and Updated for the 21st Century). Random House. ISBN 0-8129-3681-7.
- Nick de Firmian (2008). Modern Chess Openings (15 ed.). Random House.

== Notable games ==
de Firmian vs. Nikolic, 1985

Position: a8 black queen, e8 black rook, g8 black king, b7 black bishop, d7 white knight, e7 black bishop, g7 black pawn, h6 black pawn, b5 black pawn, c5 black pawn, b4 black knight, e4 white knight, d3 white queen, h3 white pawn, b2 white pawn, f2 white pawn, g2 white pawn, c1 white bishop, e1 white rook, g1 white king

Position after 26...Nb4

In de Firmian–Predrag Nikolić, 1985, de Firmian conducts an attack which ends with a complex mating combination. After 27.Nef6+! White gains an overwhelming material advantage even if Black avoids immediate checkmate with precise defense.

Achievements
Preceded by Yasser Seirawan	United States Chess Champion; 1987 (with Joel Benjamin)	Succeeded by Michael Wilder
Preceded by Boris Gulko	United States Chess Champion; 1995 (with Patrick Wolff and Alexander Ivanov)	Succeeded by Alex Yermolinsky
Preceded by Joel Benjamin	United States Chess Champion; 1998	Succeeded by Boris Gulko
