= Lubomir Kavalek =

Czech-American chess grandmaster (1943–2021)

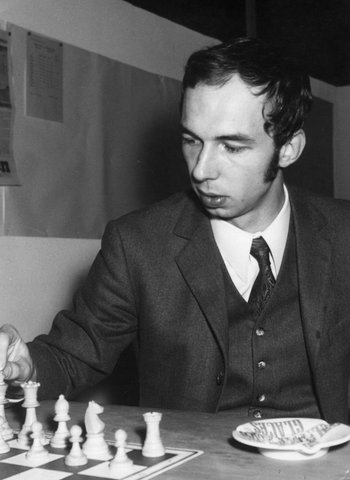
- Kavalek in 1968

Personal information
- Born: August 9, 1943 Prague, Protectorate of Bohemia and Moravia
- Died: January 18, 2021 (aged 77) Reston, Virginia, U.S.

Chess career
- Country: Czechoslovakia (until 1970); United States (after 1971)
- Title: Grandmaster (1965)
- Peak rating: 2625 (May 1974)
- Peak ranking: No. 10 (May 1974)

Lubomir (Lubosh) Kavalek (Czech: Lubomír Kaválek, August 9, 1943 – January 18, 2021) was a Czech-American chess player. He was awarded both the International Master and International Grandmaster titles by FIDE in 1965. He won two Czechoslovak and three U.S. championships, and was ranked as the world's No. 10 player in 1974. He was inducted into the U.S. Chess Hall of Fame in 2001. Kavalek was also a chess coach, organizer, teacher, commentator, author and award-winning columnist.

== Biography ==
Kavalek was born in Prague, Protectorate of Bohemia and Moravia (now the Czech Republic). He studied at the university of Žilina. He did not complete his studies and became a chess professional. His official occupation was reporter for the news "Prace" and the newspaper Mladá fronta. He won the championship of Czechoslovakia in 1962 and 1968. When Soviet tanks rolled into Prague in August 1968, Kavalek was playing in the Akiba Rubinstein Memorial in Poland, in which he finished second. Kavalek, who had always hated Communism, decided to defect to the West rather than return to Soviet-dominated Czechoslovakia. He bought several crates of vodka with his winnings, used them to bribe the border guards, and drove to West Germany. "It was the biggest loss ever suffered by Czechoslovakian chess," wrote Andrew Soltis in "The 100 Best Chess Games of the 20th Century, Ranked."

He later entered Amsterdam on a student visa and in 1970 immigrated to the United States. On his way to America, Kavalek won a strong tournament in Caracas (scoring +10−1=6). He played the first half under the Czechoslovakian flag, the second half under the American flag. He represented the United States before officially setting foot in his new adopted country. Kavalek moved to Washington, D.C., studied Slavic literature at George Washington University and worked at Voice of America (1971–72). In 1973 he became a full-time chess professional. He later became a United States citizen. He lived in Reston, Virginia.

== Chess career highlights ==
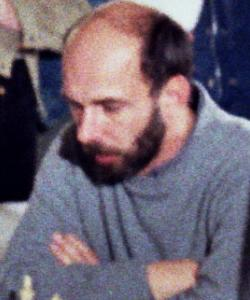
Kavalek in 1981

=== National championships ===
==== Czechoslovak Championships ====
Kavalek played in four Czechoslovak championships. Three results were significant:

- 1962 – aged 19, became the youngest player to win the Championship of Czechoslovakia. (Kavalek 12.5/17, Hort and Blatný 11)
- 1963 – shared second place (Pachman 14.5/19, Kavalek and Filip 13.5, Hort 12.5)
- 1968 – won the all-time strongest Championship (Kavalek 15/19, Hort and Smejkal 14, Filip 13, Pachman and Jansa 12)

==== US Championships ====
Kavalek finished first in three U.S. championships.

- 1972 – shared first place with Samuel Reshevsky and Robert Byrne at the U.S. Championship tournament in New York; Byrne won the playoff in Chicago in 1973.
- 1973 – co-winner with John Grefe.
- 1978 – winner with a 10–4 record, a full point ahead of James Tarjan.

=== International victories ===
==== Significant successes ====
- 1968 – first major international victory in Amsterdam (Kavalek 10.5/15, Bronstein 10)
- 1970 – On the way to the United States in 1970, Kavalek won another strong tournament in Caracas (Kavalek 13/17, Leonid Stein and Panno 12, Benko, Ivkov and Karpov 11.5)

"During the 1970s Kavalek was one of the most active and successful tournament competitors from the USA."

==== The best year - 1973 ====
Besides sharing first place at the U.S. championship, Kavalek won four tournaments:

- Lanzarote (Kavalek 8.5/10, Andersson 8, Ljubojevic 7.5, Ribli 7)
- Netanya (Kavalek 11/15, Reshevsky 10)
- Montilla, shared first (Kavalek and Pfleger 6/9)
- Bauang (Kavalek 7.5/9, Ivkov and Quinteros 6.5, Larsen 6)

He also finished third in Amsterdam (Petrosian and Planinc 10, Kavalek 9.5, Spassky 9) and in Manila (Larsen 12.5/15, Ljubojevic 11.5, Kavalek 11).

Because of these results, Kavalek moved in 1974 to number 10 in the world on the official FIDE rating list at 2625. Also in 1974 he shared first place in Solingen (Kavalek, Polugaevsky 10/14, Spassky, Kurajica 8.5).

=== Zonals and Interzonals ===
Kavalek finished third at the 1966 The Hague European Zonal (Gligorić 12.5/16, Bilek 12, Kavalek 11.5) and qualified for the 1967 Interzonal in Sousse, where he was one of the three players to draw with Bobby Fischer. In the Manila Interzonal in 1976, Kavalek finished seventh.

Kavalek also qualified for the 1979 and 1987 Interzonals, but never achieved a place in the Candidates Matches.

=== Other notable results ===
==== Other first places ====
- Split 1964 (Kavalek and Kurajica 9/11)
- Varna 1965 and again in 1967
- Zwolle in 1967
- The Hague 1968
- Netanya 1971 shared first (Kavalek and Parma 10/15)
- The West German International Championship in Bochum in 1981 (Kavalek 12/15, Hort 10.5)
- Mentor Hall of Fame Classic, Alexandria 1996 (Kavalek 2.5/4, Benko, Bisguier and Curdo 2, Denker 1.5)
- Dutch Open in Dieren in 1969 with a 10-0 perfect score

==== Second places ====
- Leipzig in 1965 (Pietzsch 10.5/15, Kavalek and Liberzon 10). The last GM norm.
- Polanica Zdroj in 1968 (Smyslov 11.5/15, Kavalek 10.5)
- Montilla-Moriles in 1976 (2nd through 4th) (Karpov 7/9, Kavalek 5.5)
- Waddinxveen, the Netherlands, in May 1979 (Karpov 4.5/6, Kavalek 3, Hort 2.5, Sosonko 2)

==== Bizarre Montreal 1979 ====
In 1979, Kavalek played in the double-round Man and his World Chess Challenge in Montreal, which he also organized. It was the most bizarre result of his career. He finished last in the first half with 1.5/9, but won the second half with 6.5/9. He ended tying for seventh place overall.

==== Other showings ====
- Bucuresti 1966 third (Korchnoi 12.5/14, Gheorghiu 10 Kavalek 9.5)
- Tilburg 1977 shared third (Karpov 8/11, Miles 7, Kavalek, Hort, Hubner, and Timman 6)
- Amsterdam 1977 shared third (Miles 10.5/15, Hulak 9.5, Kavalek and Liberzon 9)
- Amsterdam 1981 shared fourth (Timman 7.5/11, Karpov and Portisch 7, Kavalek, Hort and Smyslov 6.5)

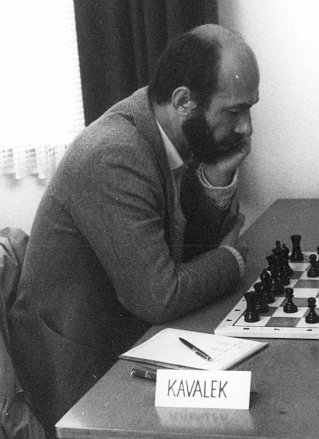
Kavalek in 1980

=== Olympiads and team competitions ===
Kavalek played in nine Chess Olympiads, representing Czechoslovakia in 1964 and 1966 and the US from 1972 through 1986 except 1980. In his seven appearances on the US team he played top board three times and second board twice, and the team collected one gold and five bronze medals. In 1976 he was a member of the first U.S. team to win a gold medal since the 1930s.

From 1969 until 1991 Kavalek was a leading player for the German team in Solingen. During his tenure the team won 10 national championships in 1969, 1971,1972,1973,1974, 1975, 1980, 1981, 1987 and 1988 and the 1976 and 1990 European Club Championships. In the 1977–79 European Club championship, Kavalek scored 5.5/6 on the top board, including two wins over V. Smyslov.

In the Nordic team vs. United States in Reykjavik in 1986, Kavalek on second board defeated Bent Larsen 1.5-0.5.

In the match Moscow vs. Prague in April 1968, Kavalek beat Evgeny Vasyukov 1.5-0.5.

In 1976, Kavalek was the top player on the Washington Plumbers team that won the National Chess League.

=== Matches ===
Kavalek won two international matches:

- In 1969 - won a 10-game match against the Dutch champion Hans Ree in Eersel, the Netherlands, with the score of 7 to 3.
- In 1978, Kavalek won a match against the world-class Swedish grandmaster Ulf Andersson by the impressive score of 6.5 to 3.5. The match was held in the showroom of a Volvo dealership in Washington, D.C.

Kavalek lost two matches against two of the world's best players in Solingen, Germany. In 1970 he lost to Bent Larsen with a score 2-6 and in 1977 he was defeated by Boris Spassky 2–4.

=== Rating ===
Kavalek ranked among the top 100 players in the world continuously from the end of 1962 until September 1988, peaking at number 10 in 1974, when he achieved his peak Elo rating of 2625 on the FIDE Rating list. By Chessmetrics ratings, he achieved his peak ranking of number 18 in early 1974 with a Chessmetrics rating of 2695. Kavalek was the highest rated American player on the January 1978, January 1979, January 1980, July 1981, and January 1982 FIDE rating lists.

== Coaching ==
Kavalek had a notable coaching career, working with Mark Diesen, Robert Byrne, Yasser Seirawan, Eugene Torre and Robert Hübner. Kavalek was also one of Bobby Fischer's seconds in the World Chess Championship 1972 and served as British grandmaster Nigel Short's trainer in the 1990 Interzonal in Manila, and in Short's successful Candidates matches against British grandmaster Jonathan Speelman, Israeli grandmaster Boris Gelfand, former world champion Anatoly Karpov and Dutch grandmaster Jan Timman, leading up to Short's 1993 world championship match against Garry Kasparov. Short and Kavalek parted company shortly after the beginning of the latter match, which Kasparov won decisively. Short and Kavalek later wrote articles for chess magazines criticizing each other. Kavalek was acting captain and team analyst of the Rest of the World team against the Soviet Union in London in 1984.

== Organizing ==
- Kavalek was the chief organizer of the prestigious Man and his World Chess Challenge in Montreal in 1979.
- Serving as the executive director of the Grandmasters Association, he organized the first World Cup series in 1988–1989.
- He also organized the Prague 90 tournament in August/September 1990 under the auspices of the Czechoslovak president Václav Havel.

== Publications ==
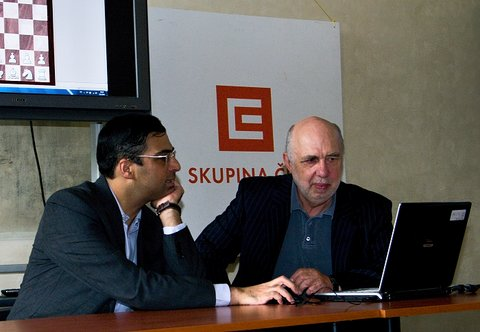
World Champion Viswanathan Anand analyzes a game with Kavalek in Prague in 2011

=== Magazine and newspaper articles ===
Kavalek was selected to Gallery of Distinguished Chess Journalists in 2006 and won Chess Journalists of America awards for the best newspaper column. Between 1960 and 2012 Kavalek's chess magazine articles have appeared in different print and online publications such as Chess Life & Review (1970–1979) and British Chess Magazine (1994–2010). He was editor-in-chief of chess publishing for RHM Press in New York from 1973 to 1986. He was the chess columnist for The Washington Post from 1986 to 2010, his last column running on January 4, 2010. In May 2010 he became the chess columnist for The Huffington Post. He was a member of the jury to select the best and most important games in Chess Informant (1989–1993).

=== Books ===
- "The Najdorf Variation of the Sicilian Defense" with Efim Geller, Svetozar Gligorić and Boris Spassky, published by RHM Press in 1976 – ISBN 0-89058-221-1
- "Wijk aan Zee Grandmaster Chess Tournament 1975" published by RHM Press in 1976 – ISBN 0-89058-214-9; "One of the greatest tournament books of all time" – Sidney Fried, Publisher
- "World Cup Chess: The Grandmasters' Grand Prix," published in England by Bloomsbury Publishing in 1990 – ISBN 0-7475-0495-4 and in the U.S. by Trafalgar Square Publishing in 1990 – ISBN 0-943955-31-9
- "Tilburg 1977 – Sachovy turnaj velmistru" (in Czech), published by SACHInfo in 2002 – ISBN 80-86595-00-5

== Brilliancy and best game prizes ==
Kavalek's three most important prizes:

- At the 1962 Student Olympiad in Mariánské Lázně, Czechoslovakia, the brilliancy prize was awarded to arguably the most famous game ever played at the Student Olympiads – Kavalek's victory over the Soviet master Eduard Gufeld. It is ranked 7th in Andrew Soltis's "The 100 Best Chess Games of the 20th Century."
- At the 1965 Student Olympiad in Sinaia, Rumania, Kavalek won the best game prize against another Soviet player, Herman Khodos.
- In 1975 in Wijk aan Zee, Kavalek won the Leo van Kuijk Prize for the Most Spectacular Game against Lajos Portisch.

== Death ==
Kavalek died in his sleep peacefully at his residence in Reston, Virginia, on January 18, 2021, at the age of 77. He was survived by his wife of 49 years, Irena Kavalek, son Steven Kavalek, daughter-in-law Theresa Kavalek and grandson Steven Kavalek Jr.

=== Tributes and condolences ===
GM Andrew Soltis: "I suspect few of today's young players know much about Lubos. To them I'd suggest taking a look at the 1962 game of Gufeld-Kavalek. When I have a bad day, I open up that game and enjoy it one more time. I'll be looking at it several times today."

GM Nigel Short: "Saddened to learn of the death of my former trainer, the Czechoslovakian & US Champion, Lubosh Kavalek. What he lacked in originality, he compensated for in assembling material and organising work (a particular weakness of mine) - and for that I am eternally grateful."

GM Ruslan Ponomariov: "the real chess legend. As a small kid I was inspired by his play to study chess."

== Notable games ==
Gufeld vs. Kavalek, Mariánské Lázně 1962

Position: f1 white rook, h2 white pawn, f2 black pawn, d2 white king, a2 white pawn, f3 black pawn, f4 black king, e4 black pawn, d4 white pawn, c6 black pawn, h7 black pawn, c7 black pawn, b7 black pawn, a7 black pawn

Final position

Here is a victory by the young Kavalek against Soviet grandmaster Eduard Gufeld. According to Larry Evans, Gufeld's soccer team had beaten Kavalek's on the previous day, and Kavalek vowed to get revenge:

Gufeld–Kavalek, Student Olympiad, Mariánské Lázně 1962
1. e4 e5 2. Nf3 Nc6 3. Bb5 Bc5 4. c3 f5 5. d4 fxe4 6. Ng5 Bb6 7. d5 e3 8. Ne4 Qh4 9. Qf3 Nf6 10. Nxf6+ gxf6 11. dxc6 exf2+ 12. Kd1 dxc6 13. Be2 Be6 14. Qh5+ Qxh5 15. Bxh5+ Ke7 16. b3 Bd5 17. Ba3+ Ke6 18. Bg4+ f5 19. Bh3 Rhg8 20. Nd2 Bxg2 21. Bxg2 Rxg2 22. Rf1 Rd8 23. Ke2 Rxd2+ 24. Kxd2 e4 25. Bf8 f4 26. b4 Rg5 27. Bc5 Rxc5! 28. bxc5 Bxc5 Now White has two rooks for a bishop,but cannot stop the march of Black's pawns. 29. Rab1 f3 30. Rb4 Kf5 31. Rd4 Bxd4 32. cxd4 Kf4 0–1 In the final position, Black, despite being a rook down, retained all eight pawns, while White is helpless against them.

Here is one of Kavalek's most remarkable games, in which he sacrificed a queen for a bishop against the strong Hungarian grandmaster Lajos Portisch:

Portisch–Kavalek, Wijk aan Zee, 1975
1. d4 Nf6 2. c4 g6 3. Nc3 Bg7 4. e4 d6 5. f3 c6 6. Be3 a6 7. Bd3 b5 8. e5 Nfd7 9. f4 O-O 10. Nf3 Nb6 11. b3 N8d7 12. a4 bxc4 13. bxc4 c5 14. a5 cxd4 15. Nxd4 dxe5 16. Nc6 Qe8 17. axb6 exf4 18. Nd5 fxe3 19. Nc7 Bc3+ 20. Kf1 B♭7 21. Nxe8 Bxc6 22. Nc7 Rad8 23. Rc1 Bd2 24. Nd5 Bxd5 25. cxd5 Nxb6 26. Rc5 Nxd5 27. g3 Rd6 28. Kg2 Rfd8 29. Rxd5 Rxd5 30. Bc4 Rf5 31. Qb3 Rf2+ 32. Kh3 Rd6 33. Qb8+ Kg7 34. Qa7 g5 35. Qxe7 g4+ 36. Kxg4 Rg6+ 37. Kh3 Rh6+ 38. Kg4 Rg6+ ½–½

Preceded by Robert Byrne	United States Chess Champion; 1973 (with John Grefe)	Succeeded by Walter Browne
Preceded by Walter Browne	United States Chess Champion; 1978–1980	Succeeded by Walter Browne, Larry Evans, and Larry Christiansen
