= Jennifer Shahade =

American chess and poker player (born 1980)

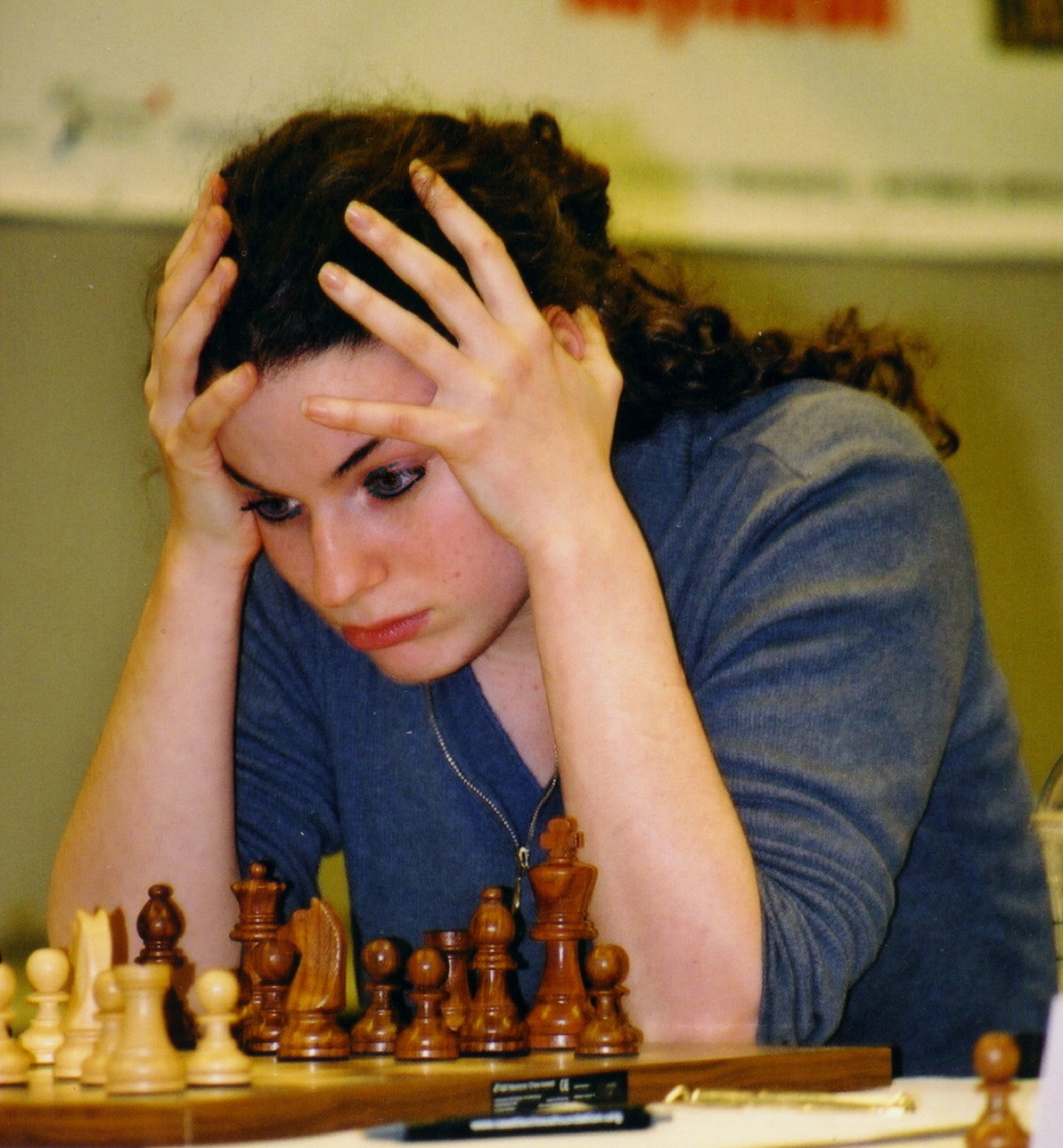
- Shahade in 2002

Personal information
- Born: December 31, 1980 (age 45) Philadelphia, Pennsylvania, US
- Spouse: Daniel Meirom

Chess career
- Country: United States
- Title: Woman Grandmaster (2005)
- FIDE rating: 2322 (January 2006)
- Peak rating: 2366 (April 2003)

Jennifer Shahade (born December 31, 1980) is an American chess player, poker player, commentator and writer. She is a two-time United States Women's Champion and has the FIDE title of Woman Grandmaster.

Shahade is the author of the books Chess Bitch, Play Like a Girl, Chess Queens, and most recently, Thinking Sideways. She is also co-author of Marcel Duchamp: The Art of Chess.

From 2018 to 2023, she was the Women's Program Director at the United States Chess Federation. She is also a MindSports Ambassador for PokerStars and a board member of the World Chess Hall of Fame in Saint Louis.

== Early life ==
Shahade was born in Philadelphia, Pennsylvania, the daughter of FIDE Master Mike Shahade and Drexel University chemistry professor and author Sally Solomon. Her father is Lebanese Christian and her mother is Lebanese Jewish. Her older brother, Greg Shahade, is an International Master. She attended Julia R. Masterman School.

== Career ==
In 1998, she became the first woman to win the U.S. Junior Open.

In 2002, she won the U.S. Women's Chess Championship in Seattle, Washington. At the next U.S. Women's Championship, she earned her second International Master norm, and in 2004, she won her second U.S. Women's Chess Championship.

Shahade earned a degree in comparative literature at New York University.

Her writing has appeared in the LA Times, The New York Times, Chess Life, New In Chess, and Games Magazine. Her first book, Chess Bitch: Women in the Ultimate Intellectual Sport (Siles Press, ISBN 1-890085-09-X) was published in October 2005. Her Wall Street Journal article on poker, loss and probabilistic thinking won a Global Poker Award. Her 2026 book Thinking Sideways: How to Think Like a Chess Player and Win at Life applies chess concepts to decision-making, drawing on psychology and poker.

Shahade is the former web editor-in-chief of the United States Chess Federation website and has hosted a monthly chess podcast, Ladies Knight, for the federation.

In 2007, Shahade co-founded a chess non-profit called 9 Queens.

Shahade is also a poker player. In 2014, she became the MindSports Ambassador for PokerStars. On December 9, 2014, Shahade won the first TonyBet Open Face Chinese Poker Live World Championship High Roller Event, taking home €100,000.

Shahade is the host of the poker podcast the GRID, which she produces with her husband Daniel Meirom. In 2019, the GRID won the Global Poker Award for Podcast of the Year. She is also a former coach for the training website Run It Once.

Shahade is a board member of the World Chess Hall of Fame. In 2018, Shahade became the woman's program director at the U.S. Chess Federation, which brings chess programming to thousands of girls in the country. Shahade resigned from the US Chess Federation on September 6, 2023. She claimed that the Federation treated her with "hostility instead of support" and that she was "constantly minimized or ignored" when she came forward with allegations of assault against GM Alejandro Ramírez. Shahade released a statement on her social media regarding her resignation, stating: "Based on what I’ve seen, I cannot currently lend my credibility to the organization in good conscience. This is especially true since I’ve become a de facto confidante for so many women and girls—making it essential for me to have faith in executive decision-making and communication." In 2026, the U.S. Chess Federation announced they had "resolved all matters between them amicably" and named Shahade "the first-ever Official Ambassador of US Chess".

== Personal life ==
Shahade is married to Daniel Meirom. They live in Philadelphia and have a son, Fabian, born in 2017. In 2019, they created "Not Particularly Beautiful", an art installation that overlaid misogynist insults directed at women in chess over the squares of a chessboard.

In February 2023, Shahade accused Alejandro Ramírez of sexually assaulting her twice, and stated that she had heard from other alleged victims. On March 6, Ramírez resigned his affiliation with the Saint Louis Chess Club and the Saint Louis University chess team. The following day, The Wall Street Journal published an article corroborating Shahade's claims, finding based on interviews with eight women, that Ramírez had made unwelcome sexual advances towards them since 2011 and that the alleged behavior was an open secret. After investigations, the United States Chess Federation confirmed Ramírez's permanent ban from US Chess membership on May 24, 2023, and on October 2, 2023, the Saint Louis Chess Club's board of directors published a statement indicating Ramírez was forbidden from participating in any events affiliated with the Saint Louis Chess Club, standing behind the United States Chess Federation's decision to suspend Ramírez.

== Works and publications ==
- Shahade, Jennifer (2005). Chess Bitch: Women in the Ultimate Intellectual Sport. Siles Press. ISBN 1-890085-09-X.
- Shahade, Jennifer (2011). Play Like a Girl!. Mongoose Press. ISBN 978-1-936277-03-2.
- Shahade, Jennifer (2022). Chess Queens: The True Story of a Chess Champion and the Greatest Female Players of All Time. Hodder & Stoughton. ISBN 978-1399701372.
- Shahade, Jennifer (2023). Play Like a Champion. Mongoose Press. ISBN 978-1936277582.
- Shahade, Jennifer (2026). Thinking Sideways. Hodder Press. ISBN 978-1399701327.
