= Michael Wilder =

American chess grandmaster and lawyer (born 1962)

Personal information
- Born: August 17, 1962 (age 64) Philadelphia, Pennsylvania, U.S.

Chess career
- Country: United States
- Title: Grandmaster (1988)
- Peak rating: 2575 (July 1989)
- Peak ranking: No. 38 (July 1989)

Michael Wilder (born August 17, 1962) is an American chess grandmaster and a J.D graduate of the University of Michigan. FIDE awarded him the grandmaster title in 1988. He won the 1988 U.S. Chess Championship. He also tied for third in the 1987 U.S. Championship and tied for first at the 1987 London Open. Mr. Wilder retired from chess in the late 1980s and is now a practicing attorney. As of March 2007, his FIDE Elo rating was 2540. His current USCF rating, which has not changed since December 1994, is 2601.

Michael Wilder lives in the U.S. with his wife and two daughters. He is a practicing tax attorney at McDermott Will & Emery in Washington, D.C.

Preceded by Joel Benjamin and Nick de Firmian	United States Chess Champion; 1988	Succeeded by Roman Dzindzichashvili, Yasser Seirawan, and Stuart Rachels
