= Alejandro Ramírez (chess player) =

Costa Rican-American grandmaster (born 1988)

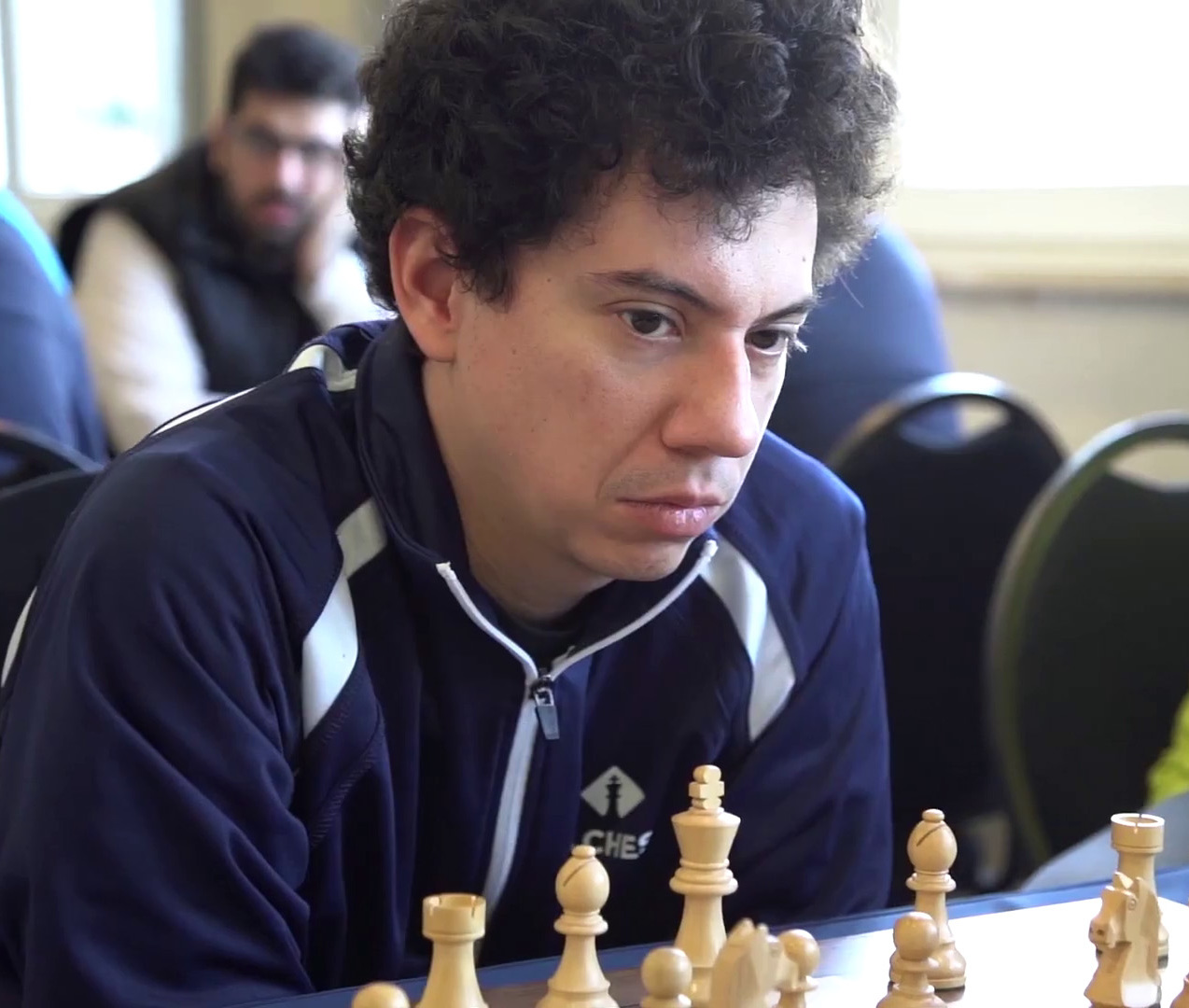
- Ramírez (2020; age 31)

Personal information
- Born: Alejandro Tadeo Ramírez Álvarez; June 21, 1988 (age 38) San José, Costa Rica

Chess career
- Country: Costa Rica (until 2011); United States (2011–2024); None (since 2024) (Note: Ramírez's FIDE federation was listed as "Non Federation" beginning in March 2024 after his suspension from the United States Chess Federation due to sexual misconduct allegations.)
- Title: Grandmaster (2004)
- FIDE rating: 2571 (November 2026)
- Peak rating: 2601 (December 2013)

Alejandro Tadeo Ramírez Álvarez (born 21 June 1988) is a Costa Rican-American chess grandmaster. At the age of 15, he became the first Central American to achieve the title of Grandmaster and was the second youngest chess grandmaster in the world at the time. Born in Costa Rica, he represented Costa Rica before switching to the United States in 2011.

== Biography ==
In 1988, Ramírez was born in San José, Costa Rica.

In early 1993, at the age of 4, Ramírez started playing chess after watching the movie Searching for Bobby Fischer (1993), being taught the game by his father, Jorge Ramírez.

=== Early career ===
In 1998, Ramírez won the Under 10 division of the Pan American Youth Chess Festival, held in Florianópolis, Brazil, and this achievement earned him the title of FIDE Master.

In November 2001, at the age of 13, Ramírez was awarded the title of International Master by scoring 6½ points in the sub-zonal tournament held in Managua, Nicaragua.

In 2002, Ramírez played for the Costa Rican team on board three at the 35th Chess Olympiad, held in Bled, Slovenia, scoring 9/14 points; he drew with Russian grandmaster Alexander Morozevich among others.

In 2003, Ramírez gained his first norm for the title of Grandmaster at the 2003 Capablanca Memorial in Havana, Cuba, where he scored 8/11 points. The second norm was obtained in August 2003 at the zonal tournament 2.3 in Guayaquil, Ecuador, where he tied for first place with Leinier Domínguez. This result earned Ramírez a spot in the FIDE World Chess Championship 2004, where he was eliminated in the first round by the eventual winner, Rustam Kasimdzhanov. Ramírez achieved his third norm at the age of 15 by scoring 7½/10 in the Los Inmortales Tournament in Santo Domingo, Dominican Republic, in November 2003.

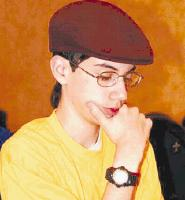
Ramírez (2006; age 18)

In 2004, FIDE awarded Ramírez the grandmaster title, making him the first chess grandmaster from the Central America area, and at the time, the second-youngest GM.

In 2004, Ramírez took part in the 2004 Chess Olympiad in Calvià playing for Costa Rica on top board.

In 2008, Ramírez took first place in the Morelia Open and played on board one for the Costa Rican team at the 38th Chess Olympiad.

In 2010, Ramírez won the US Chess Open in Irvine, California.

Ramírez graduated from the University of Texas at Dallas as a Eugene McDermott Scholar with a master's degree in arts and technology, video game design.

In 2011 Ramírez transferred to the United States Chess Federation.

In May 2013, Ramírez tied for first with Gata Kamsky in the U.S. Chess Championship, after they both scored 6½/9. Ramírez was declared runner-up after the playoff, where he drew the two rapid games and lost the Armageddon game, in which he had 19 minutes and 45 seconds against Kamsky's 45 minutes. This result enabled him to qualify for the Chess World Cup 2013, where he was knocked out by Evgeny Tomashevsky in the first round, after the Armageddon tiebreaker. Ramírez finished equal first at the 2013 World Open with a score of 6½/9.

In 2014, Ramírez finished equal second (third on countback) in the Carlos Torre Repetto Memorial.

In both 2018 and 2019, Ramírez was the highest paid employee of the Saint Louis Chess Club. Ramírez served as one of the seconds of Fabiano Caruana during the 2018 World Chess Championship match.

In October 2020, at the age of 32, Ramírez was pulled off the broadcast for the U.S. junior girls championship after a complaint by WGM Jennifer Shahade to the Saint Louis Chess Club about two past incidents in which he allegedly sexually assaulted her after she was paired with him as commentators.

In August 2022, Ramírez coached the U.S. women's team at the 44th Chess Olympiad in Chennai, India. In September 2022, a post-match interview that Ramírez conducted with Hans Niemann was a focal point of the Carlsen–Niemann controversy over Niemann's alleged cheating.

In November 2022, Ramírez tied for 1st place at the 2022 U.S. Masters Chess Championship with a score of 7/9.

Ramírez was the head coach for the Saint Louis University chess team until 2023. Under his leadership, the team won a number of tournaments, including the 2021 FIDE World University Cup Rapid Championship and the 2022 Collegiate Chess National Championship.

=== Sexual misconduct allegations ===
In a tweet published on February 16, 2023, WGM Jennifer Shahade accused Ramírez, then 34 years of age, of sexually assaulting her twice and said that she had seen "alarming evidence" from other women. The United States Chess Federation and Saint Louis Chess Club began investigating Ramírez over the alleged sexual misconduct. He was removed from the FIDE Athletes' Commission pending the result of the USCF investigation.

On March 6, 2023, Ramírez resigned his affiliation with the Saint Louis Chess Club and the Saint Louis University chess team. The following day, The Wall Street Journal published an article, based on interviews with eight women, who said that Ramírez had used his position in the chess community to make multiple unwelcome sexual advances towards them since at least 2011. The incidents alleged included forcible kissing, groping, and coercing a drunk 16-year-old to perform oral sex. The article reported that Ramírez's alleged behavior was an open secret since at least 2016, when he would have been around 28 years old.

=== Subsequent career ===
In July 2023, Ramírez finished third with a score of 6½/9 at the 2023 Open IRT Fiestas del Plátano in Sabaneta, Colombia.
