= Walter Browne =

American chess and poker player (1949–2015)

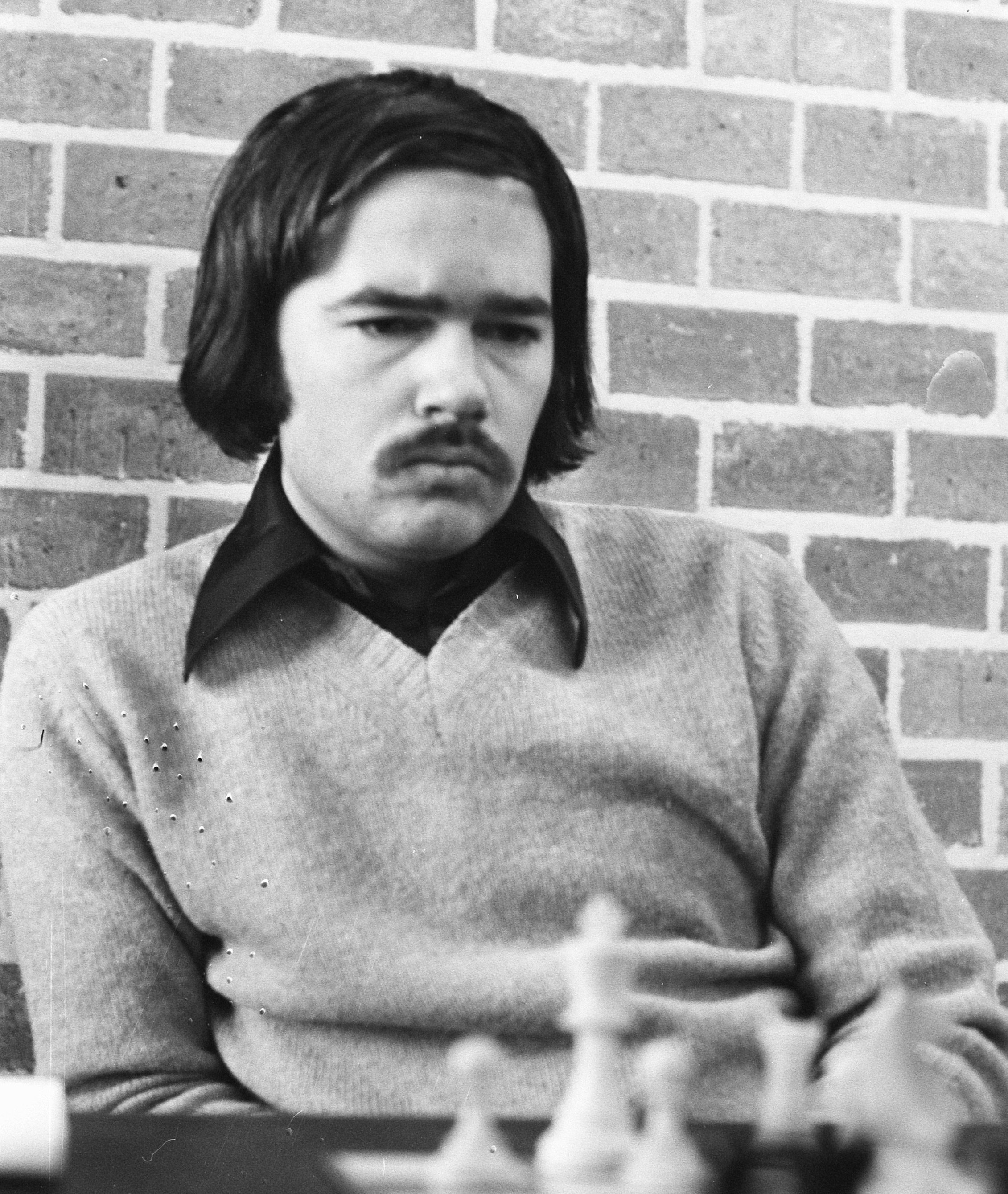
- Browne in 1975

Personal information
- Born: Walter Shawn Browne; 10 January 1949 Sydney, Australia
- Died: 24 June 2015 (aged 66) Las Vegas, Nevada, United States

Chess career
- Country: Australia (until 1974); United States (from 1974)
- Title: Grandmaster (1970)
- Peak rating: 2590 (July 1982)
- Peak ranking: No. 14 (January 1976)

Walter Shawn Browne (10 January 1949 – 24 June 2015) was an Australian-born American chess and poker player. Awarded the title Grandmaster (GM) by FIDE in 1970, he won the U.S. Chess Championship six times.

== Early years ==
Browne was born to an American father and an Australian mother in Sydney. His family moved to the New York area when he was age 4. He attended Erasmus Hall High School in Brooklyn but dropped out at age 16 to play chess professionally. Browne moved to California in 1973.

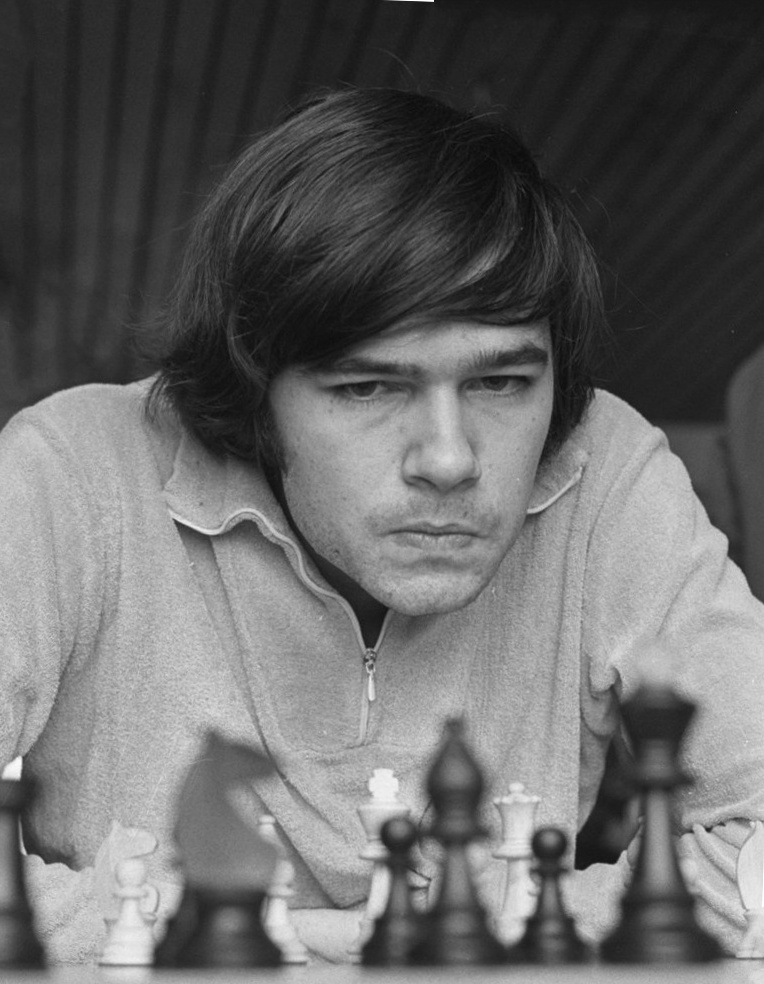
Browne in 1972

Browne won the U.S. Junior Championship in 1966.

Browne had dual Australian and American citizenship until he was 21, and represented Australia for a short time. He won the 1969 Australian Chess Championship. He tied first with Renato Naranja while representing Australia at the 1969 Asian Zonal tournament in Singapore, earning the International Master title, though Naranja qualified for the 1970 Interzonal on tie breaks.

His zonal result earned him an invitation to an international grandmaster tournament in San Juan, Puerto Rico. There, he gained the Grandmaster title by tying for 2nd–4th places, with Bruno Parma and Arthur Bisguier, behind reigning world champion Boris Spassky. He became the first GM born after World War II.

Browne played first board for Australia at the 1970 and 1972 Chess Olympiads, before switching to representing the United States in 1974.

Browne was the highest-rated American player on the January 1976, January 1984, and July 1984 FIDE rating lists.

== U.S. championships ==
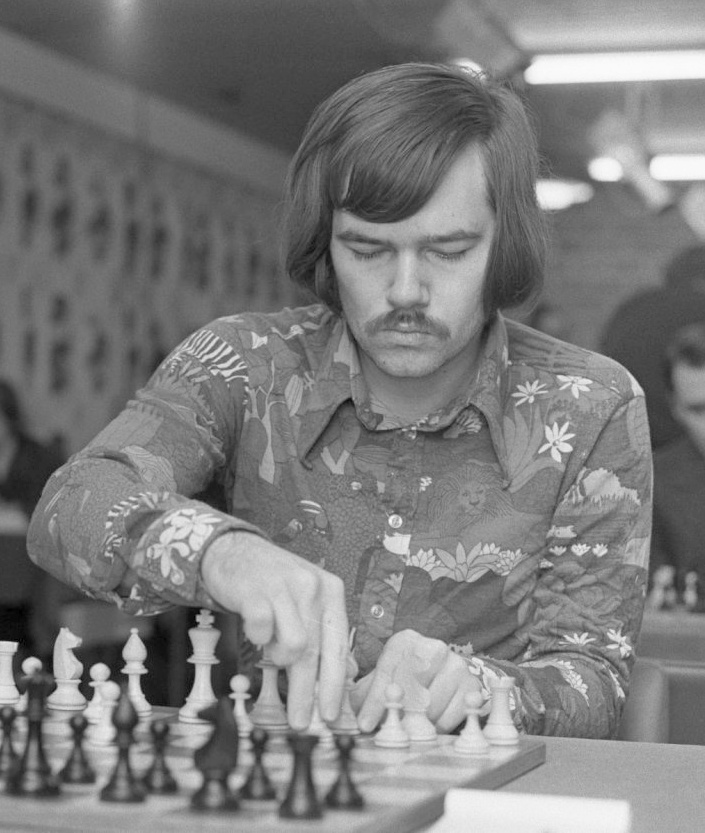
Browne in 1974

He won the U.S. Chess Championship six times. His victories were at Chicago 1974 with 9½/13, Oberlin 1975 with 8½/13, Mentor 1977 with 9/13, Greenville 1980 with 7½/12, South Bend 1981 with 9/14, and 1983 with 9/13. Of these six titles, three were shared, with three-way ties in 1980 and 1983, and a two-way split in 1981. His six titles have been exceeded only by the eight titles of Bobby Fischer, all won outright by at least a point, and Samuel Reshevsky.

== Interzonals ==
Browne qualified for three Interzonal tournaments, but never came close to qualification for the Candidates Tournament. At the Manila Interzonal 1976, Browne scored 8½/19 for 15th place. At the Las Palmas Interzonal 1982, he placed last of 14 contestants with 3/13. Finally, at the Taxco Interzonal 1985, he scored 6½/15 for a tied 9–13th place.

== Olympiads ==
Browne generally performed well at the Chess Olympiad in his six appearances. He represented Australia twice and the United States four times, winning a total of five medals, all bronze. He scored 55½/86 points (+40−15=31), for 64.5 percent. His detailed results, from olimpbase.org, follow.

- Siegen 1970, Australia board 1, 14/19 (+10–1=8);
- Skopje 1972, Australia board 1, 17½/22 (+15–2=5), board bronze;
- Nice 1974, United States board 3, 10½/17 (+7–3=7), team bronze;
- Buenos Aires 1978, United States board 2, 4½/9 (+3–3=3), team bronze;
- Lucerne 1982, United States board 1, 5½/10 (+4–3=3), team bronze;
- Thessaloniki 1984, United States board 4, 3½/9 (+1–3=5), team bronze.

== Other results ==
Browne was a dominant presence in American chess in the 1970s and 1980s. Aside from his U.S. Championship wins, he also won the National Open eleven times, the American Open seven times, the World Open three times, and the U.S. Open Chess Championship twice (1971 and 1972).

Browne also enjoyed many international successes from the early 1970s into the mid-1980s. His international firsts include Venice 1971, Wijk aan Zee 1974, Winnipeg 1974 (Pan American Championship), Lone Pine 1974, Mannheim 1975, Reykjavík 1978, Wijk aan Zee 1980, Chile 1981, Indonesia 1982 (shared with Ron Henley in a 26-player round-robin tournament), the 1983 New York Open, Gjøvik 1983, and Naestved 1985. His chess accomplishments earned him not one but two nicknames: "Six-time" and "King of the Swiss".

After dominating the U.S. Championship for a decade, however, Browne was unable to approach the same level in that event after 1983. In U.S. Championships, he scored just 7½/17 in 1984, 6½/13 in 1985, 6/15 in 1986, 6/13 in 1987, and 6/15 in 1989. He won the 1991 Canadian Open Chess Championship.

== Later life ==
Browne was inducted into the U.S. Chess Hall of Fame in 2003. He won the U.S. Senior Open in June 2005. In 2012 he published an autobiography and collection of his best games, The Stress of Chess ... and its Infinite Finesse.

In December 2014, he won the Pan-American Senior Championship in the 65+ age category, held in São Paulo, Brazil. On 22 June 2015, Browne played in the 50th Anniversary National Open Chess Championship at the Westgate Resort and Casino in Las Vegas. He tied for 9th–15th. At the 2015 Las Vegas International Chess Festival, Browne also gave a 25-board simultaneous exhibition, a lecture series, and taught a chess camp. That same weekend, Browne took byes in the National Open so he could play in the 2015 Senior Event at the World Series of Poker. He played well but did not win money.

After a week of chess and poker, Browne stayed at the home of a lifelong friend in Las Vegas, and died in his sleep on 24 June 2015. He was 66. He was survived by his wife of 42 years, Dr. Raquel Browne, a clinical psychologist.

== Books ==
- Browne, Walter (2012). The Stress of Chess ... and its Infinite Finesse: My Life, Career and 101 Best Games. Alkmaar: New In Chess. ISBN 978-90-5691-382-3.

== Playing style ==
If Bobby Fischer is the God of chess, I'm the Devil.

— Walter Browne

Browne tended to spend a lot of his allotted time during the opening moves and early middlegame; consequently, he often wound up in time trouble. This sometimes led to mistakes, even though Browne played well in time trouble, and good play during this phase could unsettle his opponents. A world-class speed chess player, Browne in 1988 formed the World Blitz Chess Association, but it ended in 2004 after encountering financial troubles.

As Browne's play improved through the 1970s, his deportment and demeanor at tournaments reportedly changed as well:

With this improvement in play there also came a marked improvement in tournament etiquette and behaviour. Always noted for his fighting spirit, there had been a number of occasions when his allegedly unsporting behaviour had offended both organizers and players alike. But the new Browne, while retaining his competitive and aggressive spirit, was more amenable to tournament discipline and in consequence a more formidable grandmaster.

== Notable games ==
- One of Browne's best games, a coruscating brilliancy against International Master Bernard Zuckerman:

Browne vs. Zuckerman, New York 1973
1.d4 d5 2.c4 e6 3.Nc3 Be7 4.Nf3 Nf6 5.Bg5 0-0 6.e3 Nbd7 7.Bd3 dxc4 8.Bxc4 c5 9.0-0 a6 10.a4 cxd4 11.exd4 Nb6 12.Bb3 Bd7 13.Ne5 Bc6 14.Bc2 Nbd5 15.Bb1 Nb4 16.Re1 g6 17.Bh6 Re8 18.Ra3 Qd6 19.Ne2 Rad8 20.Rh3 Qd5 21.Nf3 Qa5 22.Nc3 Nbd5 23.Ne5 Nxc3 24.bxc3 Bxa4 25.Qe2 Bd7 26.Bg5 Nd5 27.Nxf7 Bxg5 28.Rxh7 Nf6 29.Bxg6 Nxh7 30.Qh5 Qxc3 31.Qxh7+ Kf8 32.Rf1 Qxd4 33.Ne5 Qf4 34.Nxd7+ Rxd7 35.Qh8+ Ke7 36.Qxe8+ Kf6 37.Qxd7 Kxg6 38.Qxe6+ Bf6 39.Qe8+ Kh6 40.g3 Qb4 41.Re1 a5 42.Re6 Qb2 43.Qf7 Kg5 44.h4+ Kg4 45.Qg6+ Kh3 46.Qf5# 1–0

- Another brilliant win, this one against GM Larry Christiansen:

Browne vs. Christiansen, U.S. Championship 1977
1.d4 e6 2.c4 b6 3.d5 Ba6 4.e4 exd5 5.exd5 Nf6 6.Nc3 Bb4 7.Qe2+ Be7 8.Qc2 c6 9.Bd3 b5 10.cxb5 cxb5 11.Nge2 b4 12.Ne4 Nxd5 13.0-0 0-0 14.Rd1 Qa5 15.N2g3 g6 16.Bh6 Re8 17.Qd2 Nf6 18.Qf4 Qb6 19.Bxa6 Nxa6 20.Rd6 Bxd6 21.Nxf6+ Kh8 22.Bg7+ Kxg7 23.Ngh5+ gxh5 24.Qg5+ Kh8 25.Qh6 Bxh2+ 26.Kh1 Qxf6 27.Qxf6+ Kg8 28.Qg5+ Kh8 29.Qf6+ Kg8 30.Qg5+ Kh8 31.Kxh2 Re6 32.Rd1 Rg8 33.Qf4 Reg6 34.g3 f6 35.Rxd7 Nc5 36.Rd6 h4 37.Qxh4 a5 38.Qd4 1–0

== Poker ==
Browne was a professional poker player from the early 1970s. In 2007, he was runner up in the $2500 HORSE event of the World Series of Poker. Browne won $269,203 in live events.

Preceded by John Grefe and Lubomir Kavalek	United States Chess Champion; 1974–1978	Succeeded by Lubomir Kavalek
Preceded by Lubomir Kavalek	United States Chess Champion; 1980 (with Larry Evans and Larry Christiansen), 1981–1982 (with Yasser Seirawan), 1983 (with Larry Christiansen and Roman Dzindzichashvili)	Succeeded by Lev Alburt
