= Joel Benjamin =

American chess grandmaster (born 1964)

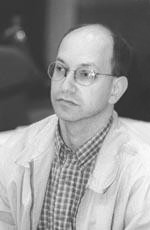

Personal information
- Born: Joel Lawrence Benjamin; March 11, 1964 (age 62) Brooklyn, New York, U.S.

Chess career
- Country: United States
- Title: Grandmaster (1986)
- FIDE rating: 2468 (November 2026)
- Peak rating: 2620 (July 1993)
- Peak ranking: No. 29 (July 1987)

Joel Lawrence Benjamin (born March 11, 1964) is an American chess player and author who holds the FIDE title of Grandmaster (GM). In 1998, he was voted "Grandmaster of the Year" by the U.S. Chess Federation.

== Life and career ==
Benjamin is a native of Brooklyn, New York City, and grew up in the Marine Park neighborhood, where he attended PS 207. He was in the class for "intellectually gifted children". He is now a New Jersey resident, married to Deborah, and they have two children, Aidan and Amy.

He graduated from Yale University with a major in history in 1985. He became the youngest-ever U.S. chess master at age 13, a record previously held by Bobby Fischer. This record was broken by Stuart Rachels and is now held by Samuel Sevian. As a junior, he won the National Elementary championship (1976), the National Junior High championship (1978), and the National High School championship (1980–81).

Other successes included the U.S. Junior Championship in 1980. In the same year he earned the International Master title. He won the U.S. Junior Championship again in 1982, and the U.S. Open Chess Championship in 1985. He earned the Grandmaster title in 1986. Benjamin was the U.S. Chess Champion in 1987 (sharing the title with Nick de Firmian), in 1997, and in 2000. He won the Saint John Open I in 1988, and the 2000 Canadian Open Chess Championship. In 1999, he placed first at the QVB Chess Festival in Sydney. He was inducted into the World Chess Hall of Fame in Miami on May 2, 2008. He is the youngest inductee.

Benjamin is known for playing offbeat openings such as the Black Knights' Tango, and for converting very small advantages into a win.

Benjamin tied for first place in the 1986 and 1987 U.S. Masters Chess Championships.

He co-authored Unorthodox Openings along with Eric Schiller, for Batsford publishers in 1987, is a frequent contributor to Chess Life magazine and other chess periodicals, and is a regular commentator on the Internet Chess Club, usually presenting its Game of the Week webcast. He was also the editor-in-chief and founder of the now defunct magazine Chess Chow from 1991 to 1994. His book American Grandmaster: Four Decades of Chess Adventures was a biographical work about his chess career. His latest book is Chessboard Combat: The Give and Take of Chess Tactics. He is also a frequent contributor to Chess Life Online articles on the USCF website.

Benjamin was hired as the official grandmaster consultant by IBM to help with the Deep Blue chess computer that defeated World Champion Garry Kasparov in 1997.

Benjamin appeared in the movies Searching for Bobby Fischer and Game Over: Kasparov and the Machine. He coaches the Columbia Grammar & Preparatory School chess team.

== Notable games ==
Benjamin vs. Gufeld, Hawaii 1998

Position: e8 black rook, f8 black rook, g8 black king, g7 black pawn, h7 black pawn, g6 white knight, h6 white queen, b5 black queen, d5 white rook, f5 black knight, a4 black pawn, b4 white pawn, e4 black pawn, a3 white pawn, g3 white pawn, a2 white bishop, b2 white bishop, f2 white pawn, h2 white pawn, g1 white king

Final position

Benjamin beat grandmaster Eduard Gufeld in the U.S. Open, Hawaii 1998:

Benjamin vs. Gufeld
1.e4 c5 2.Nf3 d6 3.d4 cxd4 4.Qxd4 a6 5.c4 Nf6 6.Nc3 Nc6 7.Qd2 e6 8.Be2 Be7 9.0-0 0-0 10.b3 Qa5 11.Bb2 Rd8 12.Rfd1 b5 13.cxb5 axb5 14.a3 Bb7 15.b4 Qb6 16.Qe1 Ba6 17.Qf1 Rab8 18.Rac1 d5 19.exd5 exd5 20.Na4 bxa4 21.Bxa6 Ne4 22.Bd3 Bd6 23.Rc2 Bf4 24.g3 Bh6 25.Re2 f5 26.Qh3 Rf8 27.Bb1 Rbe8 28.Ba2 Ne7 29.Ne5 Qb5 30.Rxe4 fxe4 31.Qe6+ Kh8 32.Qxh6 Nf5 33.Ng6+ Kg8 34.Rxd5 1–0

In January 2025, Benjamin played an 8-game match on Lichess receiving knight odds against the neural net chess engine Leela Chess Zero with a specially trained network for playing at this handicap. Benjamin won the match, scoring two wins, one loss, and five draws. Grandmaster Matthew Sadler contributed live commentary on Youtube as the match progressed.

== See also ==
- List of Jewish chess players

Achievements
Preceded by Yasser Seirawan	United States Chess Champion; 1987 (with Nick de Firmian)	Succeeded by Michael Wilder
Preceded by Alex Yermolinsky	United States Chess Champion; 1997	Succeeded by Nick de Firmian
Preceded by Boris Gulko	United States Chess Champion; 2000–2001 (with Alexander Shabalov and Yasser Seirawan)	Succeeded by Larry Christiansen
Preceded by Bobby Fischer	Youngest ever United States chessmaster 1977–1979	Succeeded by John Litvinchuk
