= Boris Gulko =

Soviet-American chess grandmaster (born 1947)

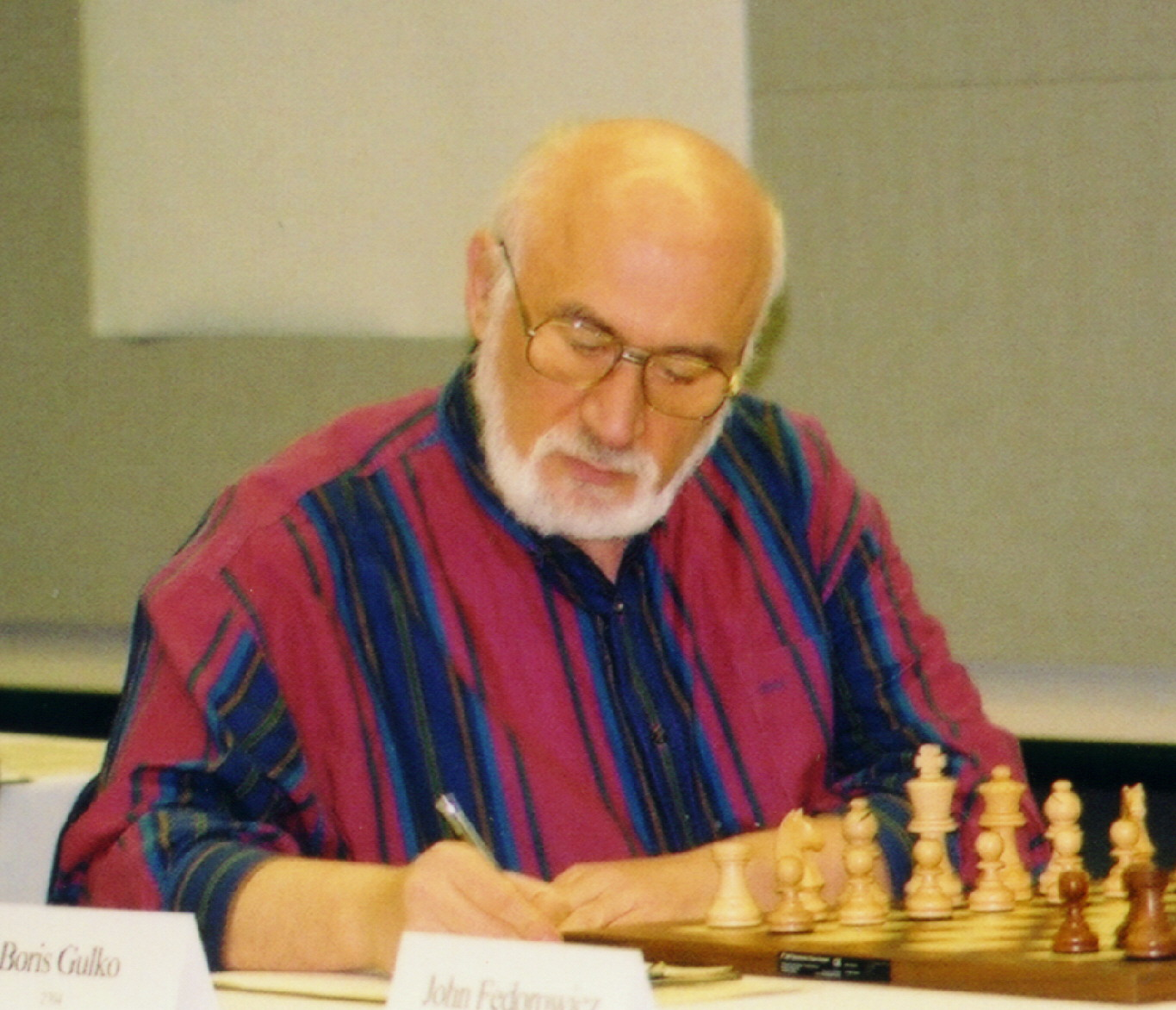
- 2002 U.S. Chess Championships

Personal information
- Born: Boris Franzevich Gulko; February 9, 1947 (age 79) Erfurt, Germany
- Spouse: Anna Akhsharumova

Chess career
- Country: Soviet Union (before 1986); Israel (1986–1987); United States (after 1987)
- Title: Grandmaster (1976)
- FIDE rating: 2542 (October 2026)
- Peak rating: 2644 (January 2000)
- Peak ranking: No. 14 (January 1989)

Boris Franzevich Gulko (Russian: Борис Францевич Гулько, IPA: [bɐˈrʲiz ɡʊlʲˈko]; born February 9, 1947) is a Soviet-American Grandmaster in chess. Notably, he is the only person to win both the Soviet Chess Championship and the U.S. Chess Championship, and one of the few players with a plus score against Garry Kasparov.

== Life and career ==
Boris Gulko was born in 1947 to a Jewish family. His father was a soldier of the Red Army and was stationed in Soviet-occupied Germany. His family returned to the Soviet Union after a few years. Gulko became an International Master in 1975, and a Grandmaster in 1976. He won the USSR Chess Championship at Leningrad in 1977 along with Iosif Dorfman. The Soviets usually would break ties for the title of Soviet Champion with a multi-game match, and 1977 was no exception. However, Gulko and Dorfman were even after the six game playoff, so they shared the title and prestige of Soviet Champion. They finished half a point ahead of a field that included three former World Champions. Shortly after, Gulko applied to leave the country, but permission was refused. He and his wife, Anna Akhsharumova, who is a Woman Grandmaster of chess, became prominent Soviet Refuseniks. As a vehement anti-Communist, he was once arrested and beaten by KGB agents.

They weren't allowed in top-level chess competition until the period of glasnost arrived, and Gulko was finally allowed to emigrate to the United States in 1986. "Thirty-nine is too old to start playing and training to reach the highest achievement in chess," said Gulko, "those seven years were a serious blow for my chess career, but I don't regret them."

After moving to the U.S. he won the U.S. Chess Championship in 1994 and 1999. He is the only chess player ever to have held both the American and Soviet championship titles. Gulko also holds an amazing positive score against Garry Kasparov, with three victories, four draws, and only one defeat, in games played from 1978 to 2001 (according to ChessGames.com). In 1998, Gulko won clear first place at the U.S. Masters Chess Championship.

Gulko was subject to anti-semitic discrimination 20 years later. He qualified to play at the 2004 World Chess Championship in Libya. The president of the Libyan Organizing Committee, dictator Gaddafi’s son, announced: "We did not and will not invite the Zionist enemies to this championship." Gulko and several other Jewish players withdrew from the tournament, and Gulko said in a letter to Kirsan Ilyumzhinov, the president of FIDE: "I implore you not to be the first president of FIDE to preside over the first world chess championship from which Jews are excluded. Our magnificent and noble game does not deserve such a disgrace."

Gulko played for Soviet Union in the Chess Olympiad of 1978 and for the United States in the Chess Olympiads of 1988–2004. He is still playing chess, although he does not participate in a large number of tournaments and has become a journalist and political commentator. After living in Fair Lawn, New Jersey for many years, the Gulkos moved to Jerusalem in 2019.

Gulko was the highest rated American player on the January 1988 (shared with Yasser Seirawan, January 1989 (again shared with Seirawan), July 1989, January 1990, and July 1990 FIDE rating lists.

== In Media ==
Gulko was featured on the cover of Chess Life Magazine, the official publication of the United States Chess Federation, in November 1998. Two articles within the issue detailed his win at the Saitek U.S. Masters Tournament held in Hawaii in late July, and his tie for first place with Judit Polgar at the U.S. Open Chess Championship held in Hawaii just a week later. Polgar and Gulko scored key wins in the last round, defeating reigning U.S. Champion Joel Benjamin and Grandmaster Pavel Blatny of Czechoslovakia, respectively.

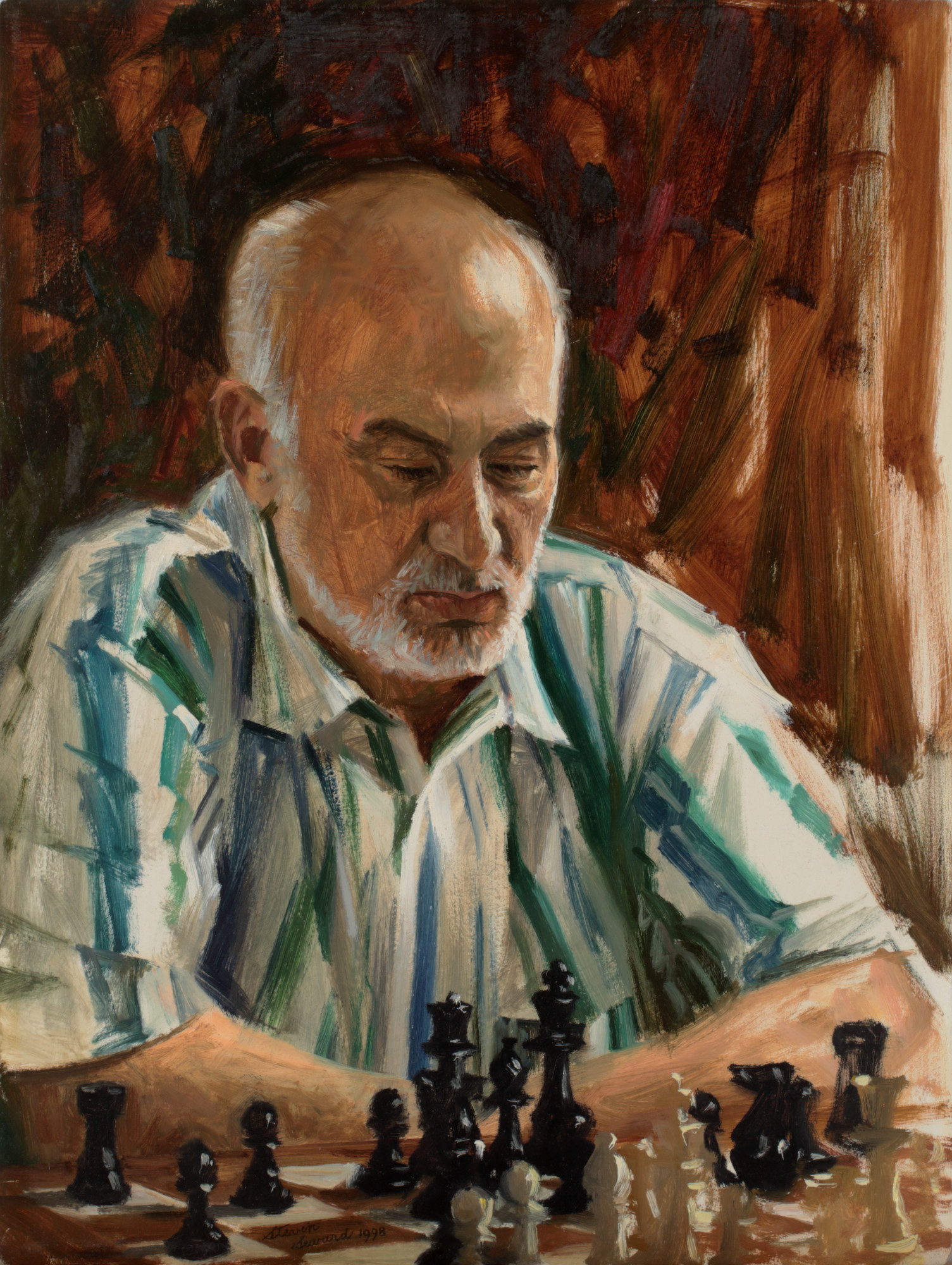
Original artwork created for the magazine cover, by Steven Seward

== Notable games ==
Kasparov vs. Gulko, Kislovodsk 1982

Position: g1 white king, a1 white rook, g2 white pawn, f2 white pawn, b2 white pawn, a2 white pawn, h3 white pawn, c3 white queen, d4 white rook, h5 black pawn, d5 black bishop, g6 black king, e6 black pawn, f7 black pawn, d7 black queen, c7 black bishop, h8 black rook, a8 black rook

Final position

Gulko has a plus record against Garry Kasparov (+3−1=4). He even beat Kasparov with the black pieces in Russia in 1982:

Kasparov vs. Gulko, Russia 1982
1.d4 d5 2.c4 dxc4 3.e3 Nf6 4.Bxc4 e6 5.Nf3 c5 6.0-0 a6 7.e4 b5 8.Bd3 Bb7 9.Bg5 cxd4 10.Nxd4 Nbd7 11.Nc3 Ne5 12.Ncxb5 Nxd3 13.Qxd3 axb5 14.Rfd1 Be7 15.Qxb5+ Qd7 16.Qb3 Bxe4 17.Nf5 Bd5 18.Nxg7+ Kf8 19.Qh3 h5 20.Qg3 Kxg7 21.Bxf6+ Kxf6 22.Rd4 Bd6 23.Qc3 Kg6 24.h3 Bc7 0–1

== Books ==
- Gulko, Boris; Sneed, Joel R. (2011). Lessons with a Grandmaster. Everyman Chess. ISBN 978-1-85744-668-5.
- Gulko, Boris; Felshtinsky, Yuri; Popov, Vladimir; Kortschnoi, Viktor (2011). The KGB Plays Chess: The Soviet Secret Police and the Fight for the World Chess Crown. Russell Enterprises. ISBN 978-1-888690-75-0.

| Preceded by Alexander Shabalov and Alex Yermolinsky | United States Chess Champion; 1994 | Succeeded by Nick de Firmian, Patrick Wolff, and Alexander Ivanov |
| Preceded by Nick de Firmian | United States Chess Champion; 1999 | Succeeded by Joel Benjamin, Alexander Shabalov, and Yasser Seirawan |
