= Larry Christiansen =

American chess grandmaster (born 1956)

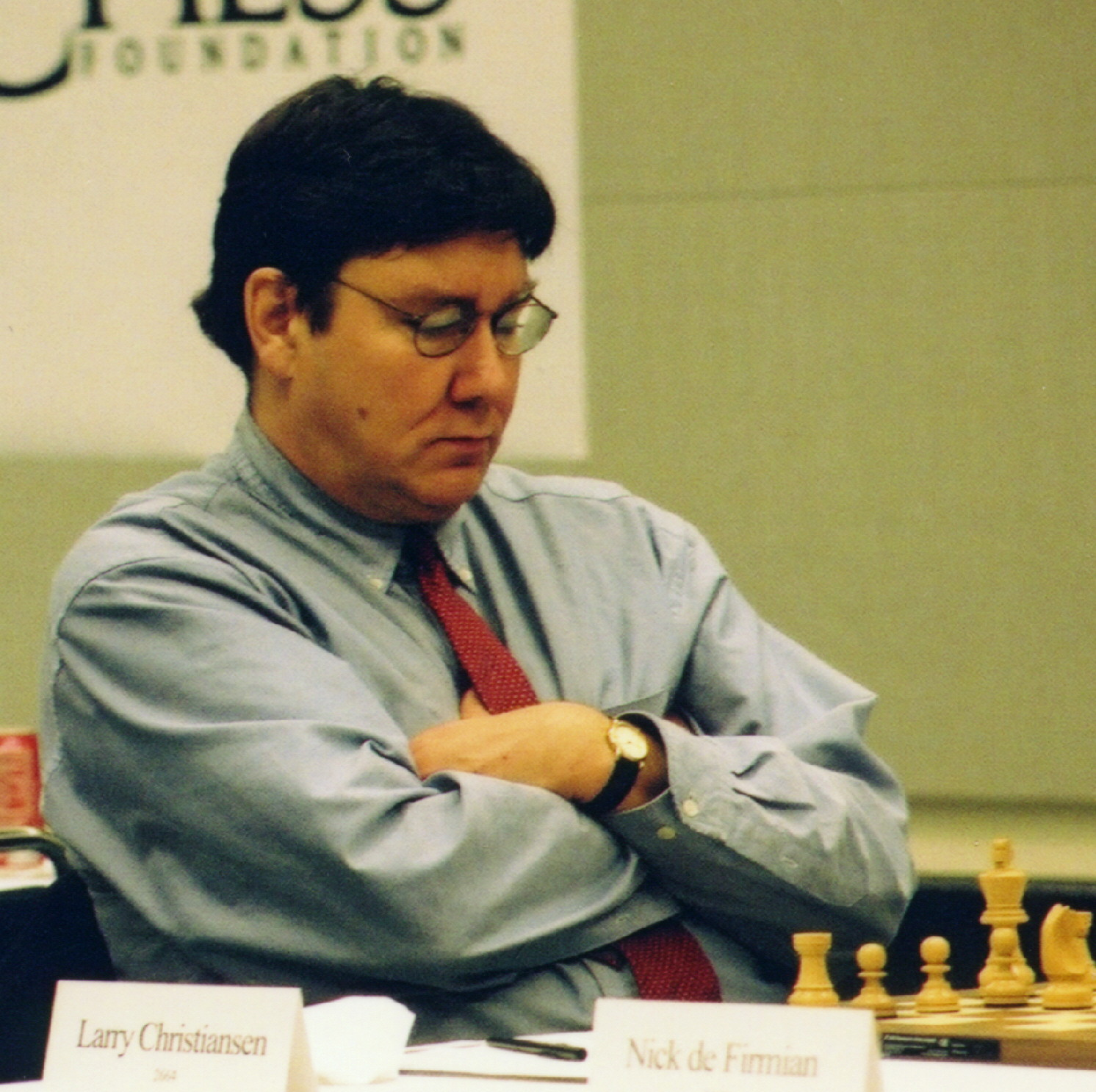
- Christiansen at the 2002 U.S. Chess Championships in Seattle, Washington

Personal information
- Born: Larry Mark Christiansen; June 27, 1956 (age 70) Riverside, California, U.S.
- Spouse: Natasha Christiansen

Chess career
- Country: United States
- Title: Grandmaster (1977)
- FIDE rating: 2563 (October 2026)
- Peak rating: 2625 (July 1992)
- Peak ranking: No. 21 (July 1992)

Larry Mark Christiansen (born June 27, 1956) is an American chess player. He was awarded the title Grandmaster by FIDE in 1977. Christiansen was the U.S. champion in 1980, 1983, and 2002. He competed in the FIDE World Championship in 1998 and 2002, and in the FIDE World Cup in 2013.

== Early life ==
Christiansen grew up in Riverside, California, United States. In 1971, he became the first junior high-school student to win the National High School Championship. He went on to win three invitational U.S. Junior Championships in 1973, 1974, and 1975.

== Chess career ==
In 1977, at age 21, he became a grandmaster without first having been an international master. He reached his final grandmaster norms by winning the Costa del Sol International Chess Tournament in 1977 in Torremolinos, Spain. In one of his strongest tournament finishes, Christiansen tied for first place with Anatoly Karpov at Linares 1981, a tournament that he had won outright two years earlier.

Christiansen has won the invitational United States Chess Championship three times, in 1980, 1983, and 2002. He won or tied for first in the U.S. Open Chess Championship in 1981, 1983, and 1986, along with the 2001 Canadian Open Chess Championship. He also won Munich 1991, Vienna 1991, Curaçao 2008, and the Bermuda Open 2011. He tied for first at the 1980 World Open, winning on tie-break. He also played for the Boston Blitz professional chess club in the United States Chess League.

Christiansen played on the United States teams in the Chess Olympiad in 1980, 1982, 1984, 1986, 1988, 1990, 1992, 1996, and 2002. He won the team silver medal in 1990 and the team bronze in 1982, 1984, 1986, and 1996.

Christiansen describes his playing style as "aggressive-tactical", and he lists his favorite opening as the Sämisch King's Indian.

== Personal life ==
Christiansen is married to attorney Natasha Christiansen and lives in Massachusetts. Earlier in his career he lived in Germany, Queens, New York, and Los Angeles.

== Notable games ==
- Larry Christiansen vs. Chessmaster 9000 (September 2002), annotated at GameKnot:
  - Game 1, Game 2, Game 3, Game 4

== Books ==
- Christiansen, Larry (2000). Storming the Barricades. Gambit Publications. ISBN 978-1-901983-25-8.
- Christiansen, Larry (2004). Rocking the Ramparts. Batsford. ISBN 0-7134-8776-3

== See also ==
- Deep Blue (chess computer)

Achievements
Preceded by Lubomir Kavalek	United States Chess Champion; 1980 (with Walter Browne and Larry Evans)	Succeeded by Walter Browne and Yasser Seirawan
Preceded by Walter Browne and Yasser Seirawan	United States Chess Champion; 1983 (with Walter Browne and Roman Dzindzichashvili)	Succeeded by Lev Alburt
Preceded by Joel Benjamin, Alexander Shabalov, and Yasser Seirawan	United States Chess Champion; 2002	Succeeded by Alexander Shabalov
