= Ray Robson =

American chess grandmaster (born 1994)

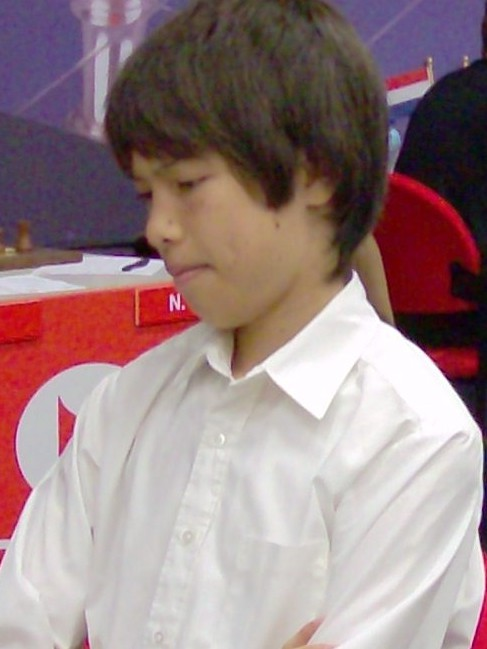
- Robson in 2010

Personal information
- Born: October 25, 1994 (age 32) Dededo, Guam

Chess career
- Country: United States
- Title: Grandmaster (2010)
- FIDE rating: 2649 (November 2026)
- Peak rating: 2704 (April 2023)
- Ranking: No. 69 (November 2026)
- Peak ranking: No. 32 (September 2024)

Ray Robson (born October 25, 1994) is an American chess grandmaster. He achieved the grandmaster title in 2010, at the time the youngest American player to be awarded the title by FIDE.

== Early life ==
Robson was born in Guam to American father Gary Robson, a professor at the college of education (applied linguistics) at St. Petersburg College, and Chinese mother Yee-chen, a kindergarten teacher at Country Day School. They later moved to Largo, Florida and then Clearwater, Florida. As an only child, he learned chess from his father at age three. He attended public school for kindergarten, then a public school for the gifted in first grade, then from grades 2-5 he was at a private Montessori school. He started homeschooling in grade 6.

Robson said as a child that he wanted to become a professional chess player, and his parents hoped for him to gain a chess scholarship to college. In April 2005, at the Super Nationals (the world's largest scholastic chess tournament) in Nashville, Tennessee, he won every match he played and emerged as the national champion in the elementary age (K-6) division. By winning this title, he earned a four-year scholarship covering full tuition and fees, along with a housing stipend, to the University of Texas at Dallas. The scholarship has a cash value of about $48,000 to non-Texas residents. The only stipulation is that the winner must meet the university's entrance requirements at matriculation. In 2009 Robson was the recipient of the Samford Fellowship. In early 2012, Robson decided to attend Webster University instead of UT Dallas.

In August 2012, Robson started his full-time study at Webster University in St. Louis under the SPICE Program, founded by former Women's World Champion Susan Polgar.

== Chess career ==
Robson has won seven national scholastic titles, including regulation events and blitz events. In addition, he has represented the United States in international scholastic events since 2004. Robson finished in the top ten at each of the World Youth Chess Championships from 2004 to 2007, and he tied for first place in the U12 section of the Pan American Youth Chess Festival in 2005 and 2006, taking the silver medal on tiebreak on both occasions.

Robson also plays in many of the major open tournaments in the United States. He finished in the top ten both at the 2006 National Chess Congress in Philadelphia and at the 2006 North American Open in Las Vegas. Robson's performance at the former event qualified him for the 2007 U.S. Chess Championship, making him the youngest player in the history of the event.

In 2004, at the age of nine, Robson defeated his first National Master in tournament play. In 2005, he defeated his first international master (IM), and in 2006 he defeated his first grandmaster (GM). He studied with GM Gregory Kaidanov for almost two years (2005–07), mainly via the phone and Internet. He has also studied with GM Alexander Onischuk.

Robson was awarded the title of FIDE Master (FM) in June 2005 after tying for first place at the Pan American Youth Festival in Brazil. He earned the USCF title of National Master (NM) in January 2006 by raising his Elo rating above 2200. Robson earned the three norms required for the IM title in only six weeks: the first at the 6th North American FIDE Invitational on November 3, 2007, in Chicago, Illinois; the second on November 27 at the World Youth Championships in Antalya, Turkey, and the third and final norm on December 10 at the University of Texas at Dallas (UTD) GM Invitational in Dallas, Texas, making him the youngest IM-elect in the United States, beating the previous record-holder Hikaru Nakamura by one month.

Robson tied for first place in the 2008 Florida championship. On July 16, 2009, he won the U.S. Junior Chess Championship. In August 2009, Robson tied for first at the Arctic Chess Challenge in Tromsø, Norway, garnering his first GM norm in the process. Later that same month, Robson then went on to earn his second GM norm by winning the 23rd North American FIDE Invitational in Skokie, Illinois. He earned his third and final GM norm in October 2009 by winning the Pan American Junior Chess Championship in Montevideo, Uruguay. He was formally awarded the title by FIDE in January 2010.

Robson played in his first FIDE World Cup in November 2009 in Russia. He competed again in this event two years later and was eliminated in the first round by Étienne Bacrot. Robson won the 2012 Webster University - SPICE Cup Open in St. Louis with an undefeated score of 7-2 . In 2014, he finished second in Millionaire Chess in Las Vegas, losing to Wesley So in the final round. In April 2015, Robson finished second in the 2015 U.S. Championship, held for the seventh consecutive year at the Chess Club and Scholastic Center of Saint Louis. He won five games, drew five, and lost one, scoring 7½/11 points.

Robson is a six-time Chess.com Puzzle Battle World Champion, holding the title from 2020 to 2024. He won the 2023 tournament while only losing a single individual battle. Robson lost the final in 2025 to Andy Woodward. In 2026, he claimed a sixth title.

He crossed FIDE classical rating of 2700 in November 2022.

Achievements
Preceded by Hikaru Nakamura	Youngest ever United States International Master; 2007–13	Succeeded by Samuel Sevian
Preceded by Fabiano Caruana	Youngest ever United States Grandmaster; 2009–14	Succeeded by Samuel Sevian
