= Jeffery Xiong =

American chess grandmaster (born 2000)

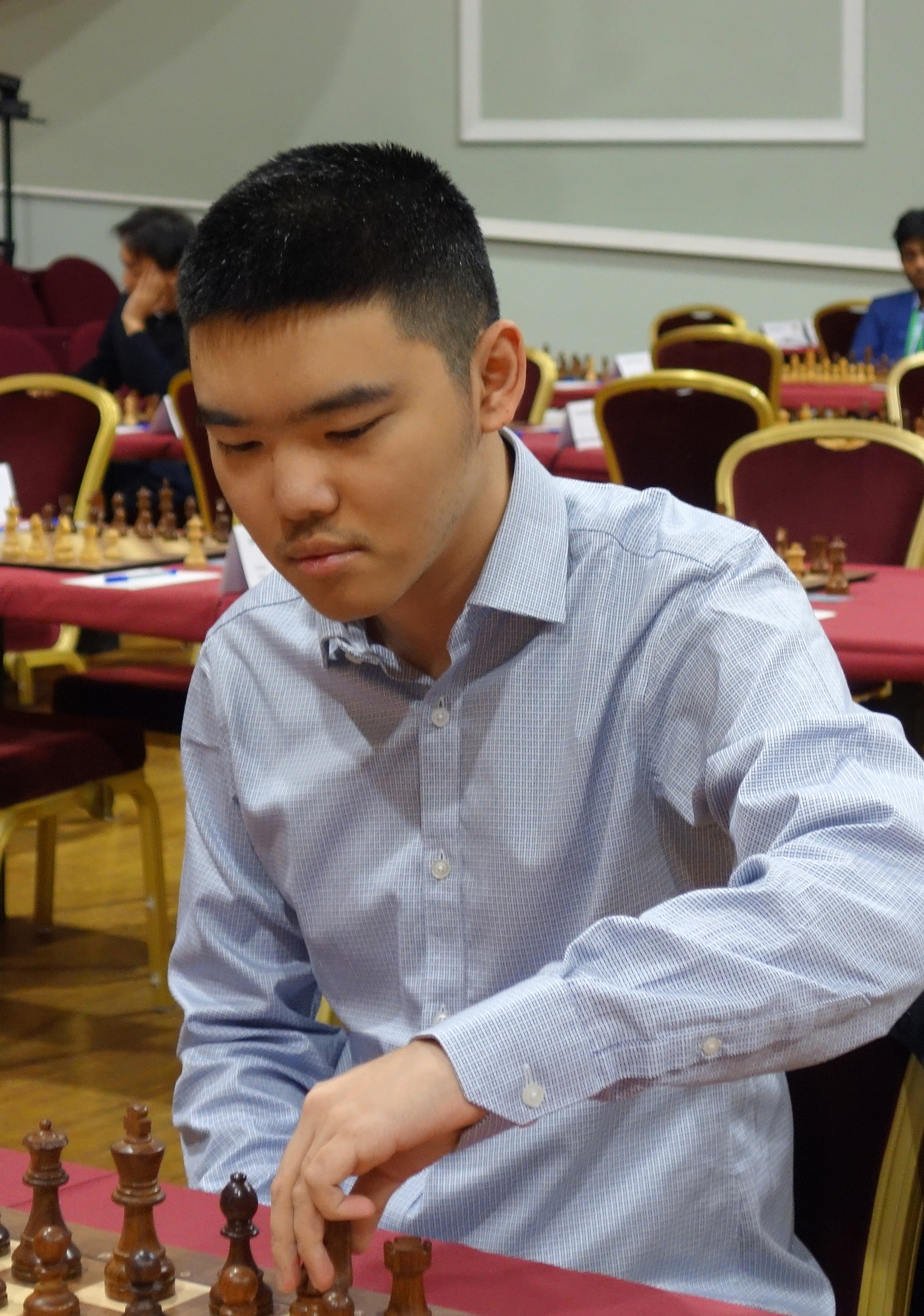
- Xiong in 2023

Personal information
- Native name: 熊奕韬
- Born: October 30, 2000 (age 25) Plano, Texas, U.S.

Chess career
- Country: United States
- Title: Grandmaster (2015)
- FIDE rating: 2656 (August 2026)
- Peak rating: 2712 (November 2019)
- Ranking: No. 58 (August 2026)
- Peak ranking: No. 30 (August 2021)

Twitch information
- Channel: gmjx
- Followers: 8,000
- Last updated: August 28, 2023

Jeffery Xiong (Chinese: 熊奕韬; pinyin: Xióng Yìtāo; born October 30, 2000) is an American chess grandmaster. He earned the Grandmaster title in September 2015 at the age of fourteen, the fourth youngest player to qualify in the US.

== Chess career ==
Xiong was aged seven when he played in his first tournament, quickly achieving the USCF title of expert on August 22, 2009. He was awarded the title FIDE Master a year later at the World Youth Chess Championships, where he was the runner-up to Jason Cao in the U10 category.

Xiong achieved his norms required for the title International Master by scoring 6/9 points at the 4th Annual Golden State Open in January 2013, 5/9 at the UT Dallas Spring FIDE Open and 5½/9 at the Annual Philadelphia Open, both in March 2013. His title was confirmed in 2014, when his FIDE rating reached 2400.

He achieved the norms for the Grandmaster title by scoring 6/9 points at the Chicago Open in 2014, 6/9 at the UT Dallas Open in November 2014, 7/9 at the Chicago Open in May 2015.

Xiong came second at the US Junior Closed Chess Championships in July 2015 with a score of 6½/9. He won the 7th Saint Louis Grandmaster Invitational 2015 with a score of 7/9. He became a Grandmaster in September 2015, the fourth youngest player to qualify for the title in the US, after Abhimanyu Mishra, Awonder Liang, and Samuel Sevian. He later received the organizer's wild card invitation to the 2016 US Chess Championship, where he finished 6th out of 12 players, with 1 win, 1 loss, and 9 draws.

In February 2016 he entered the top ten players in the world under age 20, and a month later he reached a FIDE rating of 2600 for the first time.

In July 2016, Xiong won the B group ("Premier") of the Capablanca Memorial and the US Closed Junior Championship. The following month, he won the World Junior Chess Championship, held in Bhubaneswar, India with a round to spare. He finished with an undefeated 10.5/13, a point ahead of Vladislav Artemiev.

In March 2018, Xiong won the St. Louis Spring Classic A group, a round-robin tournament of category XVII, with an unbeaten score of 6½ points (4 wins, 5 draws) out of 9, 1½ points clear of the field. His performance rating was 2819. One year later, he won again with an unbeaten 6/9 score (3 wins, 6 draws), half point clear of second-placed Illia Nyzhnyk. Later in 2018, Xiong tied for first place at the U.S. Masters Chess Championship.

In September 2019, Xiong participated in the FIDE World Cup. Seeded 31st in the tournament, he made it to the quarterfinals by beating Igor Lysyj, Parham Maghsoodloo, Anish Giri and Jan-Krzysztof Duda. Xiong was then eliminated by the eventual winner, Teimour Radjabov.

In October 2020, Xiong placed second (behind Wesley So) in the US chess championship, and also second (behind John Burke) in the US junior championship.

In April 2025, Xiong was a second of Tan Zhongyi in the Women's World Chess Championship 2025.

In September 2025, Xiong played in the FIDE Grand Swiss 2025 where he scored 6/11 with wins over Alexandra Goryachkina, Dennis Wagner, and Mateusz Bartel.

=== Bughouse ===
Xiong is also an accomplished Bughouse chess player. With partner Awonder Liang, he won the Bughouse World Championship in 2021 and 2022. As of January 27, 2025, he was ranked #9 worldwide in Bughouse on chess.com, with a rating of 2679.
