= US Chess Championship =

Annual invitational tournament

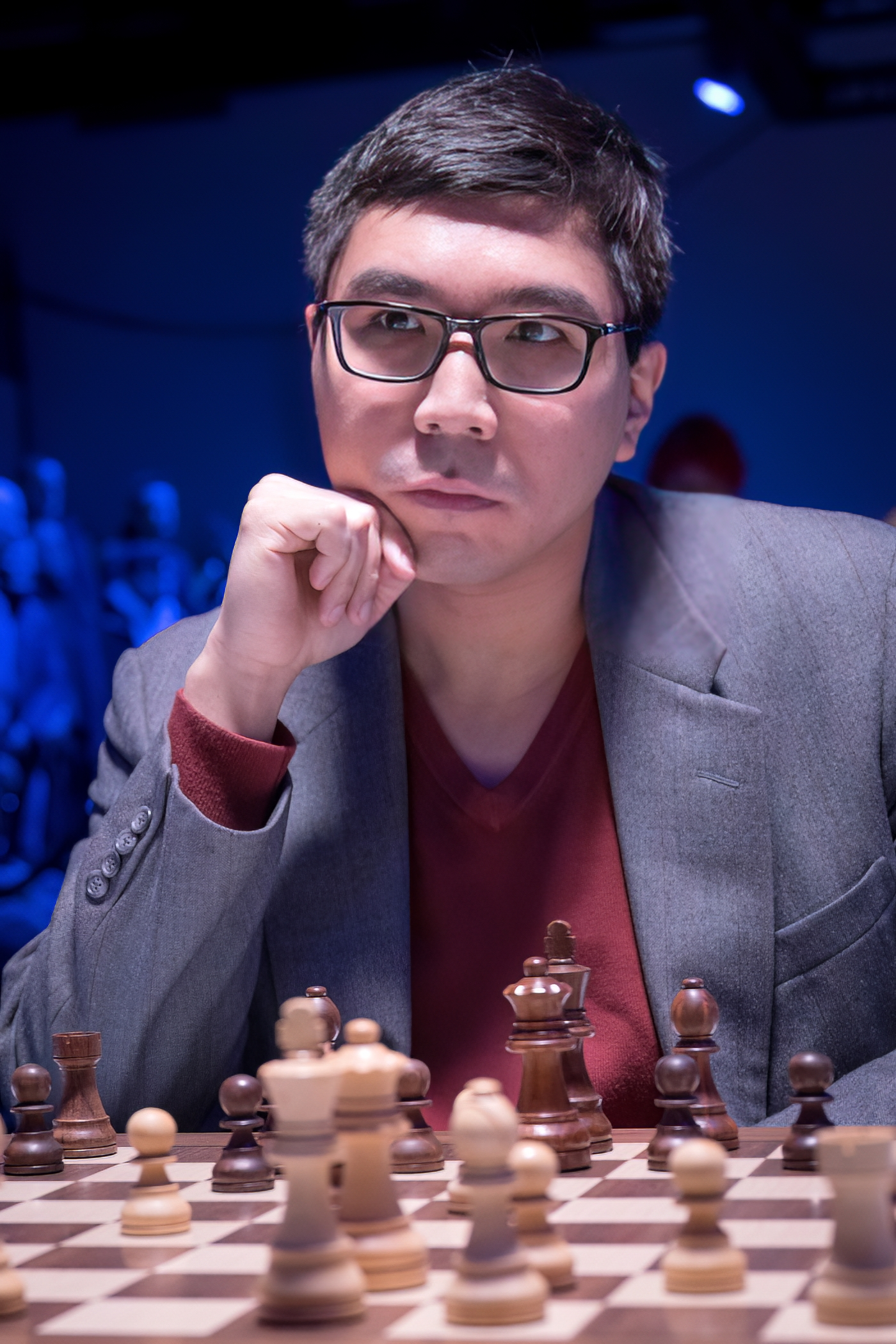
- Wesley So, the current US champion
- Awarded for: Winner of the US Championship
- Country: United States
- Presented by: United States Chess Federation

History
- First award: 1891
- Most recent: Wesley So (2026)

The US Chess Championship is an invitational tournament organized by the United States Chess Federation to determine the country's chess champion. It is the oldest national chess tournament. The event originated as a challenge match in 1845, but the champion has been decided by tournament play under the auspices of the USCF since 1936. The tournament has fluctuated between a round-robin tournament and a Swiss system. From 2000 to 2006, the championship was sponsored and organized by the Seattle Chess Foundation (later renamed America's Foundation for Chess); starting in 2002 it featured a larger body of competitors, made possible by the change to a Swiss-style format. After the Foundation withdrew its sponsorship, the 2007 and 2008 events were held in Stillwater, Oklahoma, still as a Swiss system, under tournament director Frank K. Berry. The Saint Louis Chess Club has hosted the championship since 2009. Since 2014, the championship has used a round-robin format. The event is often a Zonal tournament for the United States Chess Federation, providing qualifier spots to the Chess World Cup.

As of 2023, twelve players are invited to compete: the reigning US champion, as well as the respective winners of the US Open Chess Championship and the US Junior Championship. The remaining players are chosen by highest invitational rating, in addition to one organizer wildcard. Wesley So is the current US chess champion.

== By acclamation (1845–1891) ==
Years	Champion	Notes
1845–1857	Charles Stanley	Defeated Eugène Rousseau in a match in 1845
1857–1871	Paul Morphy	Won the first American Chess Congress in 1857
1871–1891	George Henry Mackenzie	Won the 2nd, 3rd and 5th American Chess Congress

== Match format (1891–1935) ==
George Henry Mackenzie died in April 1891 and, later that year, Max Judd proposed he, Jackson Showalter and S. Lipschütz contest a triangular match for the championship. Lipschütz withdrew so Judd and Showalter played a match which the latter won. A claim by Walter Penn Shipley that S. Lipschütz became US Champion as a result of being the top-scoring American at the Sixth American Chess Congress, New York 1889, is refuted in a biography of Lipschütz. The following US Champions until 1909 were decided by matches.

	Year	Winner	Loser	Result	Notes
1	1891‍–‍92	Jackson Showalter	Max Judd	+7−4=3	The final game was delayed until January 1892 because Judd was ill.
2	1892	Samuel Lipschütz	Jackson Showalter	+7−1=7	
3	1894	Jackson Showalter (2)	Albert Hodges	+7−6=4	Prior to the last game the players agreed to extend the match. Many sources classify this as the first of two matches instead of one extended match.
4	1894	Albert Hodges	Jackson Showalter	+5−3=1	Can be considered a match extension or a new match.
5	1895	Jackson Showalter (3)	S. Lipschütz	+7−4=3	
6	1896	Jackson Showalter (4)	Emil Kemény	+7−4=4	
7	1896	Jackson Showalter (5)	John Barry	+7−2=4	
8	1897	Harry Pillsbury	Jackson Showalter	+10−7=3	Pillsbury added to the conditions of the match : "... even if I should win, I shall leave Showalter the possession of his championship title".
9	1898	Harry Pillsbury (2)	Jackson Showalter	+7−2=2	Contrary to the 1897 match, the title of US champion was clearly at stake in 1898.
10	1909	Frank Marshall	Jackson Showalter	+7−2=3	Title reverted to Showalter after Pillsbury's death in 1906.
11	1923	Frank Marshall (2)	Edward Lasker	+5−4=9	Marshall declined to play in the invitational tournament that began in 1936.

== Round-robin format (1936–1998) ==
№	Year	Winner(s)	Notes
1	1936	Samuel Reshevsky	
2	1938	Samuel Reshevsky (2)	
3	1940	Samuel Reshevsky (3)	
-	1941	Samuel Reshevsky (4)	Match victory over I.A. Horowitz
4	1942	Samuel Reshevsky (5)	An erroneous ruling by the director allowed Reshevsky to tie for first with Isaac Kashdan. Reshevsky won a playoff match against Kashdan 6 months later.
5	1944	Arnold Denker	
-	1946	Arnold Denker (2)	Match victory over Herman Steiner
6	1946	Samuel Reshevsky (6)	
7	1948	Herman Steiner	
8	1951	Larry Evans	
-	1952	Larry Evans (2)	Match victory over Herman Steiner
9	1954	Arthur Bisguier	
10	1957/8	Bobby Fischer	At 14, the youngest champion ever
11	1958/9	Bobby Fischer (2)	
12	1959/0	Bobby Fischer (3)	
13	1960/1	Bobby Fischer (4)	
14	1961/2	Larry Evans (3)	Bobby Fischer did not enter
15	1962/3	Bobby Fischer (5)	
16	1963/4	Bobby Fischer (6)	The only perfect score in US Championship history
17	1965/6	Bobby Fischer (7)	
18	1966/7	Bobby Fischer (8)	A record eighth win (out of eight attempts)
19	1968	Larry Evans (4)	
20	1969	Samuel Reshevsky (7)	
21	1972	Robert Byrne	Playoff held 9 months after the tournament, with Byrne winning over Reshevsky and Kavalek
22	1973	Lubomir Kavalek; John Grefe	
23	1974	Walter Browne	
24	1975	Walter Browne (2)	
25	1977	Walter Browne (3)	
26	1978	Lubomir Kavalek (2)	
27	1980	Walter Browne (4); Larry Christiansen; Larry Evans (5)	
28	1981	Walter Browne (5); Yasser Seirawan	
29	1983	Walter Browne (6); Larry Christiansen (2); Roman Dzindzichashvili	
30	1984	Lev Alburt	
31	1985	Lev Alburt (2)	
32	1986	Yasser Seirawan (2)	
33	1987	Joel Benjamin; Nick de Firmian	
34	1988	Michael Wilder	
35	1989	Roman Dzindzichashvili (2); Stuart Rachels; Yasser Seirawan (3)	
36	1990	Lev Alburt (3)	Knockout tournament
37	1991	Gata Kamsky	Knockout tournament
38	1992	Patrick Wolff	
39	1993	Alexander Shabalov; Alex Yermolinsky	
40	1994	Boris Gulko	The only person to have held both the US and Soviet championships
41	1995	Nick de Firmian (2); Patrick Wolff (2); Alexander Ivanov	
42	1996	Alex Yermolinsky (2)	
43	1997	Joel Benjamin (2)	
44	1998	Nick de Firmian (3)	

== Swiss format (1999–2013) ==
№	Year	Winner(s)	Notes
45	1999	Boris Gulko (2)	
46	2000	Joel Benjamin (3); Alexander Shabalov (2); Yasser Seirawan (4)	
47	2002	Larry Christiansen (3)	
48	2003	Alexander Shabalov (3)	
49	2005	Hikaru Nakamura	Tournament was played in 2004, but called the 2005 Championship for legal reasons
50	2006	Alexander Onischuk	
51	2007	Alexander Shabalov (4)	
52	2008	Yury Shulman	
53	2009	Hikaru Nakamura (2)	
54	2010	Gata Kamsky (2)	Kamsky won an Armageddon tie-break playoff against Yury Shulman
55	2011	Gata Kamsky (3)	
56	2012	Hikaru Nakamura (3)	Switched to a round-robin tournament for this year only
57	2013	Gata Kamsky (4)	Kamsky won an Armageddon tie-break playoff against Alejandro Ramírez

== Round-robin format (2014–present) ==
№	Year	Winner(s)	Notes
58	2014	Gata Kamsky (5)	Kamsky won a playoff rapid against Varuzhan Akobian after Akobian qualified by beating Aleksandr Lenderman on an Armageddon tie-break
59	2015	Hikaru Nakamura (4)	
60	2016	Fabiano Caruana	
61	2017	Wesley So	Wesley So won a rapid playoff against Alexander Onischuk
62	2018	Samuel Shankland	
63	2019	Hikaru Nakamura (5)	
64	2020	Wesley So (2)	Tournament held online via Lichess due to the COVID-19 pandemic.
65	2021	Wesley So (3)	So won a rapid playoff against Fabiano Caruana and Samuel Sevian
66	2022	Fabiano Caruana (2)	
67	2023	Fabiano Caruana (3)	
68	2024	Fabiano Caruana (4)	
69	2025	Fabiano Caruana (5)	Caruana ties Fischer's record of 4 consecutive US Championship wins
70	2026	Wesley So (4)	So won a rapid playoff against Fabiano Caruana

== Players by number of championships ==
Name	Total Victories	Tournament Victories	Match Victories	Years
Bobby Fischer	8	8	0	1957/8 1958/9 1959/60 1960/1 1962/3 1963/4 1965/6 1966/7
Samuel Reshevsky	7	6	1	1936 1938 1940 1941 1942 1946 1969
Walter Browne	6	6	0	1974 1975 1977 1980 1981 1983
Larry Evans	5	4	1	1951 1952 1961/2 1968 1980
Gata Kamsky	5	5	0	1991 2010 2011 2013 2014
Hikaru Nakamura	5	5	0	2005 2009 2012 2015 2019
Jackson Showalter	5	0	5	1891–92 1894 1895 1896 1896
Fabiano Caruana	5	5	0	2016 2022 2023 2024 2025
Yasser Seirawan	4	4	0	1981 1986 1989 2000
Alexander Shabalov	4	4	0	1993 2000 2003 2007
Wesley So	4	4	0	2017 2020 2021 2026
Lev Alburt	3	3	0	1984 1985 1990
Joel Benjamin	3	3	0	1987 1997 2000
Larry Christiansen	3	3	0	1980 1983 2002
Nick de Firmian	3	3	0	1987 1995 1998
Arnold Denker	2	1	1	1944 1946
Roman Dzindzichashvili	2	2	0	1983 1989
Boris Gulko	2	2	0	1994 1999
Lubomir Kavalek	2	2	0	1973 1978
Frank Marshall	2	0	2	1909 1923
Harry Pillsbury	2	0	2	1897 1898
Patrick Wolff	2	2	0	1992 1995
Alex Yermolinsky	2	2	0	1993 1996
Arthur Bisguier	1	1	0	1954
Robert Byrne	1	1	0	1972
John Grefe	1	1	0	1973
Albert Hodges	1	0	1	1894
Alexander Ivanov	1	1	0	1995
Samuel Lipschütz	1	0	1	1892
Alexander Onischuk	1	1	0	2006
Stuart Rachels	1	1	0	1989
Samuel Shankland	1	1	0	2018
Yury Shulman	1	1	0	2008
Herman Steiner	1	1	0	1948
Michael Wilder	1	1	0	1988

== See also ==
- US Women's Chess Championship
- US Open Chess Championship
- US Women's Open Chess Championship
- American Chess Congress
