= Dariusz Świercz =

Polish-American chess grandmaster (born 1994)

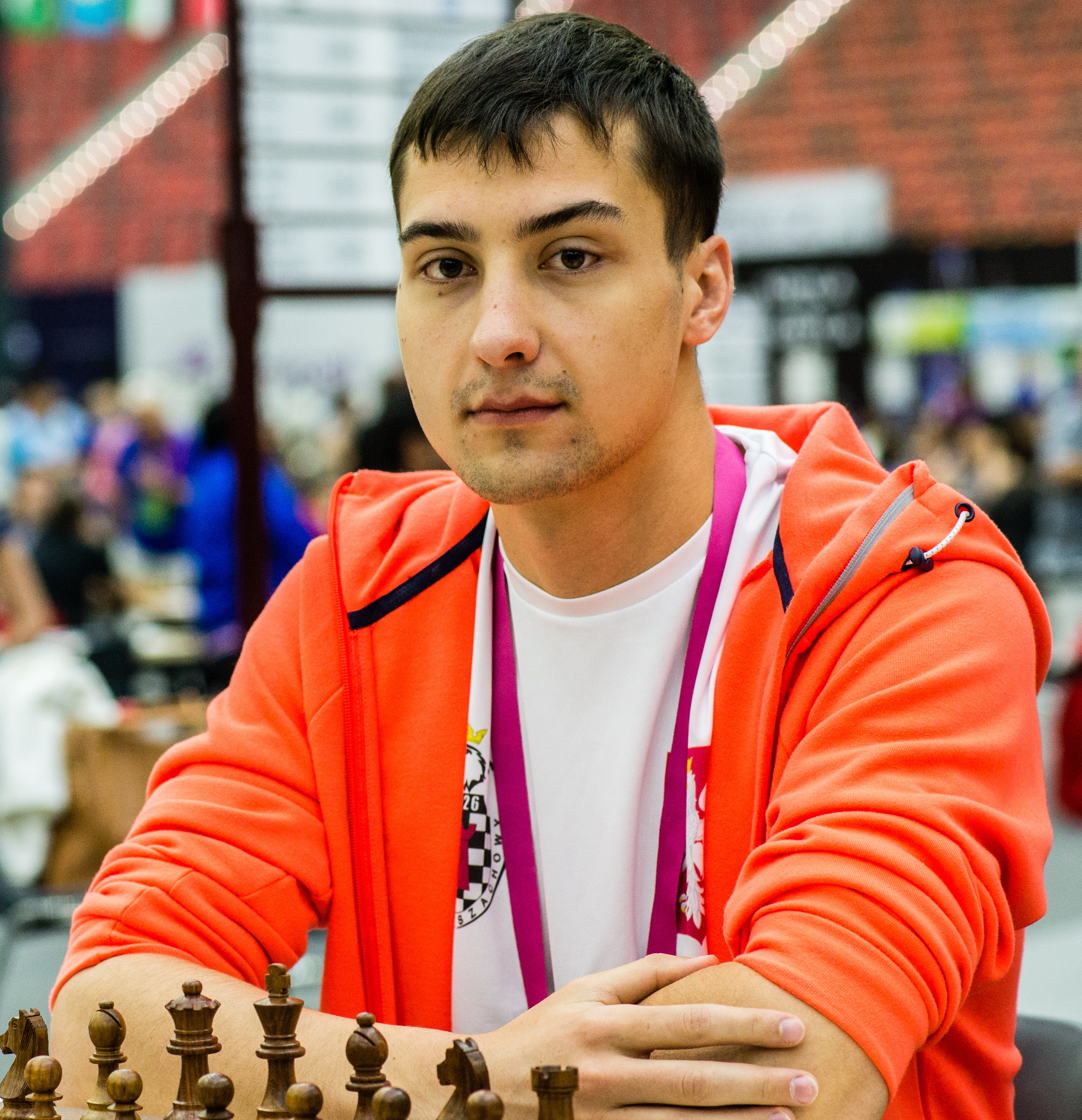
- Świercz in 2016

Personal information
- Born: 31 May 1994 (age 32) Tarnowskie Góry, Poland

Chess career
- Country: Poland (until 2018); United States (since 2018)
- Title: Grandmaster (2009)
- FIDE rating: 2579 (July 2026)
- Peak rating: 2670 (August 2019)
- Peak ranking: No. 71 (August 2019)

Dariusz Świercz (born 31 May 1994) is a Polish-American chess player playing for the United States. He was the youngest Polish player of all time to qualify for the title Grandmaster; he was 14 years and seven months when he achieved this title in 2009. In 2018 he switched his national federation to the United States.

Świercz won the 2011 World Junior Chess Championship at the age of 17 and is currently the only Polish male chess player to win this title. The following year he also won the Under 18 World Championship.

Świercz currently serves as assistant coach for the Saint Louis University chess team.

== Chess beginnings ==
Świercz learned how to play chess at the age of three from his grandfather. He became a FIDE Master in 2004 at the age of eleven, an International Master in 2008 at thirteen and a Grandmaster in 2009 at the age of 14.

== Team ==
Świercz had his first major debut as part of the Polish national team in 2012, competing on his home country's team on the 4th board at the 40th Chess Olympiad in Istanbul. With a result of 7 points from 10 games, and a rating performance of 2705, he took 5th place in the board evaluation.

== Clubs ==
Świercz plays for clubs in:

- Czech Republic Extraliga – TJ Tatran Litovel (2010–2014) | AD Mahrla Praha (2014–Present)
- France Top 12 – Rueil Malmaison (2013–present)
- Germany Bundesliga – Turm Emsdetten (2011–present)
- Italy CIS Masters - WorldTradingLab Club 64 Modena (2015–present)
- Turkey SATRANÇ LİGİ – T.S Alyans Spor Kulübü (2013–present)
- Poland Ekstraliga – KSz POLONIA VOTUM Wrocław

== Notable results ==
- In February 2002, he finished 1st in the Polish Boys Championship – U10
- In March 2003, he finished 1st in the Rubicon Cup European Chess Championships – U9
- In July 2004, he finished equal 1st (3rd on Buchholz System) in the European Boys Chess Championship – U10
- In November 2004, he finished equal 2nd (3rd on Buchholz System) in the World Chess Championships – U10
- In February 2005, he finished 1st in the Polish Boys Championship – U12
- In February 2006, he finished 1st in the Polish Boys Championship – U12
- In February 2007, he finished 1st in the Australian City Of Sydney Championships – Open
- In April 2007, he finished 1st in the Polish Boys Championship – U14
- In August 2007, he finished 1st in the 5th European Union Youth Championship – U14
- In October 2007, he finished 2nd in the 17th European Youth Chess Championship – Boys U14
- In October 2008, he finished 3rd in the World Youth Chess Championship – Open U14
- In July 2009, member of the Polish youth side that won the silver medal in the European youth team championship U18 – BOYS
- In August 2010, he finished 3rd at the World Junior Chess Championships – U20
- In November 2010, he finished 1st at The Cultural Village tournament which acted as a qualifier for remaining places in the GM Group C Tata Steel Chess tournament.
- In January 2011, he finished equal 4th in the Tata Steel Chess Tournament GM Group C
- In April 2011, playing on the 1st board his club (TJ Tatran Litovel) came 3rd in the Czech Extraliga 2010/2011
- In July 2011, he finished equal 1st (2nd on Buchholz System) in the Miguel Najdorf International Chess Festival Tournament A
- In August 2011, he finished 1st in the 50th World Junior Chess Championship
- In September 2012, he took 5th place on the 4th board in the board evaluation at the 40th Chess Olympiad in Istanbul
- In November 2012, he finished 1st in the World Youth Chess Championship U18 Open
- In April 2013 he helped his team TJ Tatran Litovel to 3rd place in the 2012/13 season of the Czech Extraliga
- In August 2013 he reached the 2nd Round being knocked out by the 4th seed in the Chess World Cup 2013
- In September 2013 he helped his team KSz Polonia Wrocław to 3rd place in the 2013 season of the Polish Ekstraliga
- In January 2014 he finished 1st in the XXIV Miedzynarodowy Festiwal Szachowy CRACOVIA - 2013, Blitz
- In April/May 2015 he helped his team WorldTradingLab Club 64 Modena to 2nd place in the 47th Italian Team Championship Where he also got the most points for the Tournament
- In October 2016 he finished 1st in the 3rd Millionaire Chess Open
- In October 2017 he finished equal 1st in the 11th Spice Cup Open
- In December 2017 he helped his team St. Louis University to 2nd place in the Pan American Intercollegiate Team Chess 2017
- In August 2025 he won the US Open and qualified for the US Championship.
