= Saint Louis Chess Club =

American chess venue in Missouri

- Formation: 2007; 19 years ago
- Type: Chess club
- Legal status: 501(c)(3) organization
- Headquarters: 4657 Maryland Avenue, St. Louis, Missouri, U.S.
- Coordinates: 38.6444°N 90.2611°W
- Website: saintlouischessclub.org
- Formerly called: Chess Club and Scholastic Center of Saint Louis

The Saint Louis Chess Club (previously, the Chess Club and Scholastic Center of Saint Louis) is a chess club in the Central West End in St. Louis, Missouri, United States. It was founded in 2008 by billionaire Rex Sinquefield as part of his effort to improve U.S. chess and turn St. Louis into an international chess center, an effort that also moved the World Chess Hall of Fame into a building across the street.

The club hosts the annual Sinquefield Cup tournament, the only U.S. stop on the Grand Chess Tour. Founded at the club in 2013, it is one of the world's strongest tournaments as measured by its competitors' world rankings.

The club drew national attention in 2023 when officials were accused of concealing the alleged sexual assaults of a grandmaster employee.

== History ==
In 2007, Rex Sinquefield, a billionaire and libertarian activist, founded the Chess Club and Scholastic Center of Saint Louis. It was the first major expenditure in his efforts to boost chess in Saint Louis and the United States; by 2018, he would spend an estimated $50 million on chess-related philanthropy.

It was reopened on July 17, 2008, as the St. Louis Chess Club, in facilities that had contained a tournament hall and a basement broadcast studio.

Backed by Sinquefield's largess, the club quickly grew to prominence in the United States' chess community. In 2009, the club began hosting the annual U.S. Championships and U.S. Women's Championships. The following year, it added the annual Junior Closed Championship.

The success of the 2009–2010 U.S. Championships led the United States Chess Federation to name the STLCC the 2010 Chess Club of the Year. The USCF also recognized STLCC Executive Director Tony Rich as Organizer of the Year for both years.

In August 2010, Sinquefield provided seed funding to move the World Chess Hall of Fame to St. Louis, citing the Chess Club's presence and reputation.

In 2013, Sinquefield and the club launched the Sinquefield Cup, a super-GM tournament consisting of many of the world's strongest grandmasters. In 2014, the tournament was the strongest in history (by rating), with an average rating of 2802.

The STLCC holds yearly tournaments in chess960 that they trademark as Chess 9LX.

On September 19, 2022, all Club operations temporarily moved to the adjacent space that housed the original incarnation of the chess-themed Kingside Diner. All tournaments in the interim are held at 308 N Euclid Ave, the old Kingside Diner space, the basement of The Chase Park Plaza Hotel, Il Monastero at Saint Louis University, or the World Chess Hall of Fame.

=== Allegations of sexual assaults ===
In 2020, club officials received allegations of sexual assaults by Alejandro Ramirez, a resident grandmaster who was the club's highest-paid employee for at least two years. Officials said they launched no formal investigation but "stopped engaging Ramirez in any capacity where he would come into contact with minors".

In 2022, two-time women's national champion Jennifer Shahade filed a formal complaint to the United States Chess Federation alleging that Ramirez had twice sexually assaulted her. In February 2023, Shahade, frustrated by the responses of club and federation officials, posted her allegations to social media. Within a month, seven more women came forward to accuse Ramirez of sexually assaulting them. In March 2023, the Wall Street Journal reported that club officials had known of allegations against Ramirez at least since 2015. Ramirez resigned from the club.

In August 2023, Shahade sued the U.S. federation, alleging that they had mishandled the allegations and tried to silence her. Officials denied the allegations. Leading chess platforms Chess.com and Lichess announced that they would no longer support the St. Louis club nor cover its tournaments because of how the club had handled the allegations.

Two months later, the club's board of directors released a statement in which they said the club "should have done more to address the allegations made by those who bravely came forward with information about his inexcusable behavior". They also said the club had hired a legal team led by Catherine Hanaway "to review all its guidelines, practices and procedures when it comes to ensuring the safety and security of everyone participating in chess". After this statement, Chess.com resumed its support and coverage of the club's tournaments, while Lichess did not. Lichess resumed their support on June 18th, 2025 after the club updated their policies.

== Grandmaster-in-Residence ==
The STLCC has a Grandmaster-in-Residence who provides lectures, lessons and camps for the community.

== See also ==
- Sinquefield Cup
