= Nijat Abasov =

Azerbaijani chess grandmaster (born 1995)

- Abasov at the 2026 Chess Olympiad

Personal information
- Born: Nijat Azad oğlu Abasov; 14 May 1995 (age 31) Baku, Azerbaijan

Chess career
- Country: Azerbaijan
- Title: Grandmaster (2011)
- FIDE rating: 2580 (September 2026)
- Peak rating: 2679 (October 2023)
- Peak ranking: No. 53 (November 2023)

Nijat Azad oglu Abasov (Azerbaijani: Nicat Azad oğlu Abasov; born 14 May 1995) is an Azerbaijani chess grandmaster. In September 2023, he reached his all-time-highest rating of 2679 and in October 2023 was ranked No. 53 in the world. He competed in the Candidates Tournament 2024, obtaining last place.

== Early years ==
Abasov was awarded the title of International Master in 2009. He gained his third and final norm required for the title of Grandmaster in the Azerbaijanian Solidarity Day event in late December 2010, in which he placed first. FIDE awarded him the title in February 2011.

== Professional career ==
In November 2015, Abasov won the Cultural Village tournament in Wijk aan Zee to qualify for the 2016 Tata Steel Challengers tournament. In this latter he scored 6½ points out of 13. Abasov played on team Azerbaijan 2 in the 42nd Chess Olympiad in Baku. In late December 2016, he won the Zurich Christmas Open on tiebreak from Viktor Láznička, Dennis Wagner, Christian Bauer and Mateusz Bartel. In 2017, Abasov won both the Azerbaijani Chess Championship and the Baku Open tournament.

In October 2019, Nijat earned 6.5 points (+2=9-0) in the FIDE Grand Swiss Tournament, finishing 15th out of 154 players. In November that year, Abasov climbed to #93 in the world rankings and entered the FIDE Top 100 for the first time in his career.

In the Chess World Cup 2023, 69th seed Abasov upset 5th seed Anish Giri in the third round. He went on to make it to the semi-finals by defeating 37th seed Peter Svidler in the fourth round, 53rd seed Salem Saleh in the fifth round, and 20th seed Vidit Gujrathi in the quarterfinals. In the semi-finals he lost to world #1 Magnus Carlsen, and he lost the third place playoff to world #3 Fabiano Caruana, meaning he finished fourth. Carlsen announced that he would not participate in the Candidates Tournament 2024, and therefore Abasov, as one of the top three finishers at the World Cup (excluding Carlsen), qualified for the Candidates.

Abasov's second for the Candidates was Shakhriyar Mamedyarov. He finished last out of eight players, on 3.5/14.

In April 2026, Abasov participated in the European Individual Chess Championship 2026. He scored 8.5/11 (+6=5-0) and finished second on tiebreaks.
