= Tata Steel Chess Tournament 2014 =

Chess tournament 2014

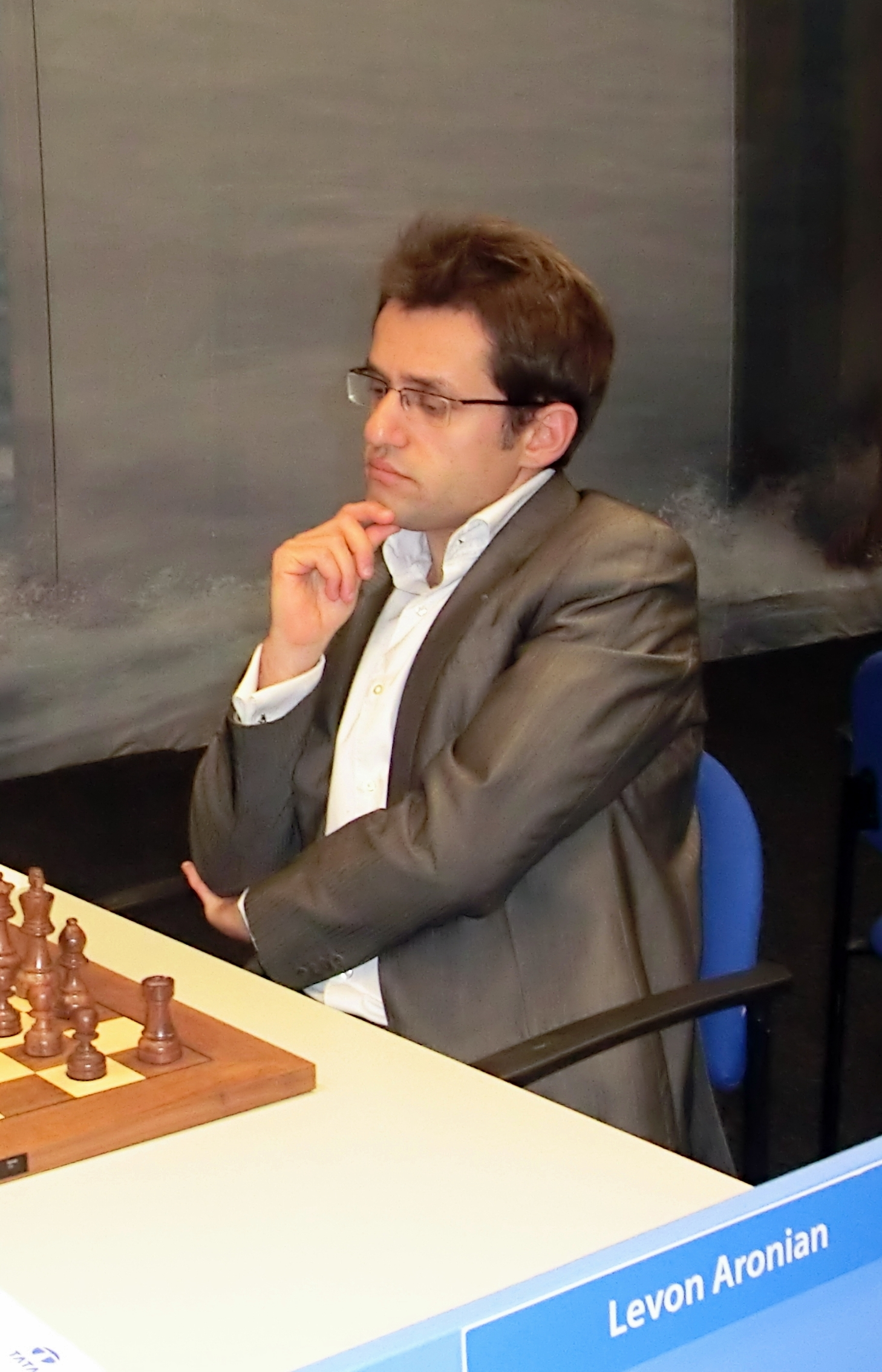
- Levon Aronian pictured at Tata Steel 2013.
- Location: Wijk aan Zee, Netherlands
- Dates: 11–26 January 2014
- Competitors: 28
- Winning score: 8 points of 11

Champion
- (Armenia) Levon Aronian (Masters) (Croatia) Ivan Šarić (Challengers)

The Tata Steel Chess Tournament 2014 was the 76th edition of the Tata Steel Chess Tournament. It was held in Wijk aan Zee (with away days in Eindhoven and Amsterdam) from 11 to 26 January 2014.

The tournament was won by Levon Aronian who finished on 8/11, winning the title for the fourth time with a round to spare, ensuring his blunder in the final game did not cost him victory.

76th Tata Steel Masters, 11–26 January 2014, Wijk aan Zee — Eindhoven — Amsterdam, Cat. XX (2743)
	Player	Rating	1	2	3	4	5	6	7	8	9	10	11	12	Total	SB	TPR
1	Levon Aronian (Armenia)	2812		½	1	1	1	1	½	0	1	½	½	1	8		2911
2	Anish Giri (Netherlands)	2734	½		½	½	½	½	1	½	½	½	½	1	6½	34.25	2809
3	Sergey Karjakin (Russia)	2759	0	½		0	½	½	½	1	½	1	1	1	6½	31.00	2806
4	Fabiano Caruana (Italy)	2782	0	½	1		0	½	½	1	½	1	1	0	6	31.00	2775
5	Leinier Domínguez (Cuba)	2754	0	½	½	1		1	0	½	½	½	1	½	6	31.00	2778
6	Wesley So (Philippines)	2719	0	½	½	½	0		½	1	½	1	1	½	6	29.50	2781
7	Pentala Harikrishna (India)	2706	½	0	½	½	1	½		½	1	0	0	1	5½		2746
8	Loek van Wely (Netherlands)	2672	1	½	0	0	½	0	½		1	0	½	1	5	27.25	2713
9	Hikaru Nakamura (United States)	2789	0	½	½	½	½	½	0	0		½	1	1	5	24.75	2703
10	Boris Gelfand (Israel)	2777	½	½	0	0	½	0	1	1	½		0	½	4½		2675
11	Richárd Rapport (Hungary)	2691	½	½	0	0	0	0	1	½	0	1		0	3½	19.75	2614
12	Arkadij Naiditsch (Germany)	2718	0	0	0	1	½	½	0	0	0	½	1		3½	17.75	2612

2014 Tata Steel Challengers, 11–26 January 2014, Wijk aan Zee, Netherlands, Category XIV (2579)
	Player	Rating	1	2	3	4	5	6	7	8	9	10	11	12	13	14	Total	SB	TPR
1	GM Ivan Šarić (Croatia)	2637		½	½	½	1	½	1	1	1	½	1	1	½	1	10		2785
2	GM Jan Timman (Netherlands)	2607	½		½	½	1	½	0	1	½	1	½	1	½	1	8½	51.50	2686
3	GM Baadur Jobava (Georgia)	2710	½	½		½	0	1	1	½	1	0	½	1	1	1	8½	49.50	2679
4	GM Anna Muzychuk (Slovenia)	2566	½	½	½		½	½	0	1	½	1	1	½	½	1	8	47.75	2667
5	GM Dimitri Reinderman (Netherlands)	2593	0	0	1	½		½	1	0	1	0	1	1	1	1	8	44.00	2665
6	IM Benjamin Bok (Netherlands)	2560	½	½	0	½	½		1	½	½	1	½	0	1	½	7	43.50	2609
7	GM Yu Yangyi (China)	2677	0	1	0	1	0	0		1	½	0	½	1	1	1	7	38.75	2600
8	GM Jan-Krzysztof Duda (Poland)	2553	0	0	½	0	1	½	0		½	1	1	½	1	1	7	37.00	2610
9	GM Radosław Wojtaszek (Poland)	2711	0	½	0	½	0	½	½	½		1	½	1	1	1	7	36.50	2597
10	GM Sabino Brunello (Italy)	2602	½	0	1	0	1	0	1	0	0		½	½	1	½	6		2548
11	IM Kayden Troff (United States)	2457	0	½	½	0	0	½	½	0	½	½		½	1	0	4½	27.25	2478
12	GM Zhao Xue (China)	2567	0	0	0	½	0	1	0	½	0	½	½		½	1	4½	23.25	2470
13	IM Merijn van Delft (Netherlands)	2430	½	½	0	½	0	0	0	0	0	0	0	½		1	3		2379
14	IM Etienne Goudriaan (Netherlands)	2431	0	0	0	0	0	½	0	0	0	½	1	0	0		2		2294
