= Corus Chess Tournament 2008 =

Chess tournament in the Netherlands

- Venue: Wijk aan Zee

The Corus Chess Tournament 2008 was the 70th edition of the Corus Chess Tournament.

It took place in the De Moriaan Community Centre in Wijk aan Zee in January 2008. The format of each of the three Grandmaster groups remained a 14 player single round robin. The participants in group A included eight of the world's top ten players (country, October 2007 rating and rank in brackets): Viswanathan Anand (India, 2801, 1), Vasyl Ivanchuk (Ukraine, 2787, 2), Vladimir Kramnik (Russia, 2785, 3), Veselin Topalov (Bulgaria, 2769, 4), Peter Leko (Hungary, 2755, 5=), Shakhriyar Mamedyarov (Azerbaijan, 2752, 7), Teimour Radjabov (Azerbaijan, 2742, 8) and Levon Aronian (Armenia, 2741, 9). The remaining players were Boris Gelfand (Israel, 2736, 11), Michael Adams (England, 2729, 13), Magnus Carlsen (Norway, 2714, 16=), Judit Polgár (Hungary, 2708, 20), Pavel Eljanov (Ukraine, 2691, 26) and Loek van Wely (Netherlands, 2679, 31). The average rating of 2742 made it a Category 20 tournament. The only top ten players not participating were Alexander Morozevich (Russia, 2755, 5=) and Alexei Shirov (Spain, 2739, 10).

The tournament was won by Levon Aronian and Magnus Carlsen (both scoring 8 out of 13).

Grandmaster group B was won by Sergei Movsesian of Slovakia with 9½ points, and group C by Italy's Fabiano Caruana with 10, two points ahead of his nearest rival. The Honorary group, a new category consisting of four former A group champions playing a double round robin, was won by Ljubomir Ljubojević with 4 points out of 6, ahead of Jan Timman, Viktor Korchnoi and Lajos Portisch.

The tournament was also notable for the "handshake incident", in which Nigel Short was awarded a win by forfeit after his opponent, Ivan Cheparinov, refused to shake his hand.

70th Corus Chess Tournament, grandmaster group A, 12–27 January 2008, Wijk aan Zee, Cat. XX (2742)
	Player	Rating	1	2	3	4	5	6	7	8	9	10	11	12	13	14	Total	SB	TPR
1	Levon Aronian (Armenia)	2739		½	½	1	½	½	½	0	1	½	½	½	1	1	8	50.00	2830
2	Magnus Carlsen (Norway)	2733	½		0	½	0	½	½	1	½	1	1	1	1	½	8	48.50	2830
3	Viswanathan Anand (India)	2799	½	1		0	½	½	½	½	1	1	½	½	½	½	7½	48.00	2795
4	Teimour Radjabov (Azerbaijan)	2735	0	½	1		½	½	½	½	½	½	½	1	½	1	7½	46.50	2800
5	Peter Leko (Hungary)	2753	½	1	½	½		½	½	½	0	½	1	½	½	½	7	46.00	2770
6	Vasyl Ivanchuk (Ukraine)	2751	½	½	½	½	½		½	½	½	½	½	1	½	½	7	44.50	2771
7	Michael Adams (England)	2726	½	½	½	½	½	½		½	½	0	½	½	1	½	6½	41.75	2744
8	Vladimir Kramnik (Russia)	2799	1	0	½	½	½	½	½		0	½	½	1	½	½	6½	41.75	2738
9	Veselin Topalov (Bulgaria)	2780	0	½	0	½	1	½	½	1		½	½	0	0	1	6	39.00	2710
10	Judit Polgár (Hungary)	2707	½	0	0	½	½	½	1	½	½		½	0	½	1	6	38.00	2716
11	Shakhriyar Mamedyarov (Azerbaijan)	2760	½	0	½	½	0	½	½	½	½	½		½	1	½	6	37.50	2712
12	Pavel Eljanov (Ukraine)	2692	½	0	½	0	½	0	½	0	1	1	½		½	0	5	32.00	2659
13	Loek van Wely (Netherlands)	2681	0	0	½	½	½	½	0	½	1	½	0	½		½	5	31.75	2660
14	Boris Gelfand (Israel)	2737	0	½	½	0	½	½	½	½	0	0	½	1	½		5	31.75	2656

70th Corus Chess Tournament, grandmaster group B, 12–27 January 2008, Wijk aan Zee, Cat. XV (2618)
	Player	Rating	1	2	3	4	5	6	7	8	9	10	11	12	13	14	Total	SB	TPR
1	GM Sergei Movsesian (Slovakia)	2677		½	½	½	½	½	1	1	1	1	½	½	1	1	9½		2789
2	GM Nigel Short (England)	2645	½		½	½	½	1	1	1	0	½	½	1	1	½	8½	52.50	2726
3	GM Étienne Bacrot (France)	2700	½	½		½	½	½	½	1	1	½	½	½	1	1	8½	51.75	2722
4	GM Pentala Harikrishna (India)	2664	½	½	½		½	1	½	0	1	½	½	½	½	1	7½		2672
5	GM Ian Nepomniachtchi (Russia)	2600	½	½	½	½		0	½	0	½	1	½	1	½	1	7		2648
6	GM Ivan Cheparinov (Bulgaria)	2713	½	0	½	0	1		0	0	½	1	½	½	1	1	6½		2611
7	GM Erwin l'Ami (Netherlands)	2581	0	0	½	½	½	1		½	1	½	1	½	0	0	6	38.00	2592
8	GM Jan Smeets (Netherlands)	2573	0	0	0	1	1	1	½		0	½	1	½	½	0	6	37.50	2593
9	WGM Hou Yifan (China)	2527	0	1	0	0	½	½	0	1		½	½	1	½	½	6	36.50	2596
10	GM Daniël Stellwagen (Netherlands)	2625	0	½	½	½	0	0	½	½	½		½	½	1	1	6	35.50	2589
11	GM Humpy Koneru (India)	2612	½	½	½	½	½	½	0	0	½	½		½	1	0	5½		2562
12	GM Gabriel Sargissian (Armenia)	2676	½	0	½	½	0	½	½	½	0	½	½		0	1	5	31.75	2527
13	GM Michał Krasenkow (Poland)	2636	0	0	0	½	½	0	1	½	½	0	0	1		1	5	28.25	2530
14	IM Wouter Spoelman (Netherlands)	2424	0	½	0	0	0	0	1	1	½	0	1	0	0		4		2492

70th Corus Chess Tournament, grandmaster group C, 12–27 January 2008, Wijk aan Zee, Cat. X (2494)
	Player	Rating	1	2	3	4	5	6	7	8	9	10	11	12	13	14	Total	SB	TPR
1	GM Fabiano Caruana (Italy)	2598		½	1	1	0	1	1	1	1	0	½	1	1	1	10		2696
2	GM Dimitri Reinderman (Netherlands)	2533	½		½	1	½	½	½	0	½	1	½	½	1	1	8	48.00	2577
3	GM Parimarjan Negi (India)	2526	0	½		0	1	0	1	0	½	1	1	1	1	1	8	44.25	2578
4	GM Pontus Carlsson (Sweden)	2501	0	0	1		0	1	½	1	½	½	½	½	1	1	7½		2550
5	WGM Irina Krush (United States)	2473	1	½	0	1		1	1	0	½	0	0	½	½	1	7	45.25	2524
6	IM Arik Braun (Germany)	2536	0	½	1	0	0		½	1	1	½	0	1	1	½	7	42.00	2519
7	GM John van der Wiel (Netherlands)	2490	0	½	0	½	0	½		1	½	1	1	½	1	½	7	41.25	2523
8	GM Friso Nijboer (Netherlands)	2578	0	1	1	0	1	0	0		0	1	½	½	1	1	7	40.75	2516
9	IM Mark van der Werf (Netherlands)	2389	0	½	½	½	½	0	½	1		1	1	½	0	½	6½		2502
10	GM Li Shilong (China)	2502	1	0	0	½	1	½	0	0	0		1	½	1	½	6	38.00	2464
11	GM Efstratios Grivas (Greece)	2509	½	½	0	½	1	1	0	½	0	0		1	0	1	6	36.75	2463
12	GM Peng Zhaoqin (Netherlands)	2461	0	½	0	½	½	0	½	½	½	½	0		0	1	4½	26.50	2386
13	WGM Anna Ushenina (Ukraine)	2484	0	0	0	0	½	0	0	0	1	0	1	1		1	4½	22.50	2384
14	Dennis Ruijgrok (Netherlands)	2329	0	0	0	0	0	½	½	0	½	½	0	0	0		2		2210

70th Corus Chess, honorary group, 12–27 January 2008, Wijk aan Zee, Cat. XIII (2560)
	Player	Rating	1	2	3	4	Total	SB	TPR
1	Ljubomir Ljubojević (Serbia)	2565		0 1	½ 1	½ 1	4		2683
2	Jan Timman (Netherlands)	2559	1 0		½ 1	½ 0	3	9.50	2560
3	Viktor Korchnoi (Switzerland)	2545	½ 0	½ 0		1 1	3	7.50	2565
4	Lajos Portisch (Hungary)	2570	½ 0	½ 1	0 0		2		2431
