= Tata Steel Chess Tournament 2016 =

Chess tournament 2016

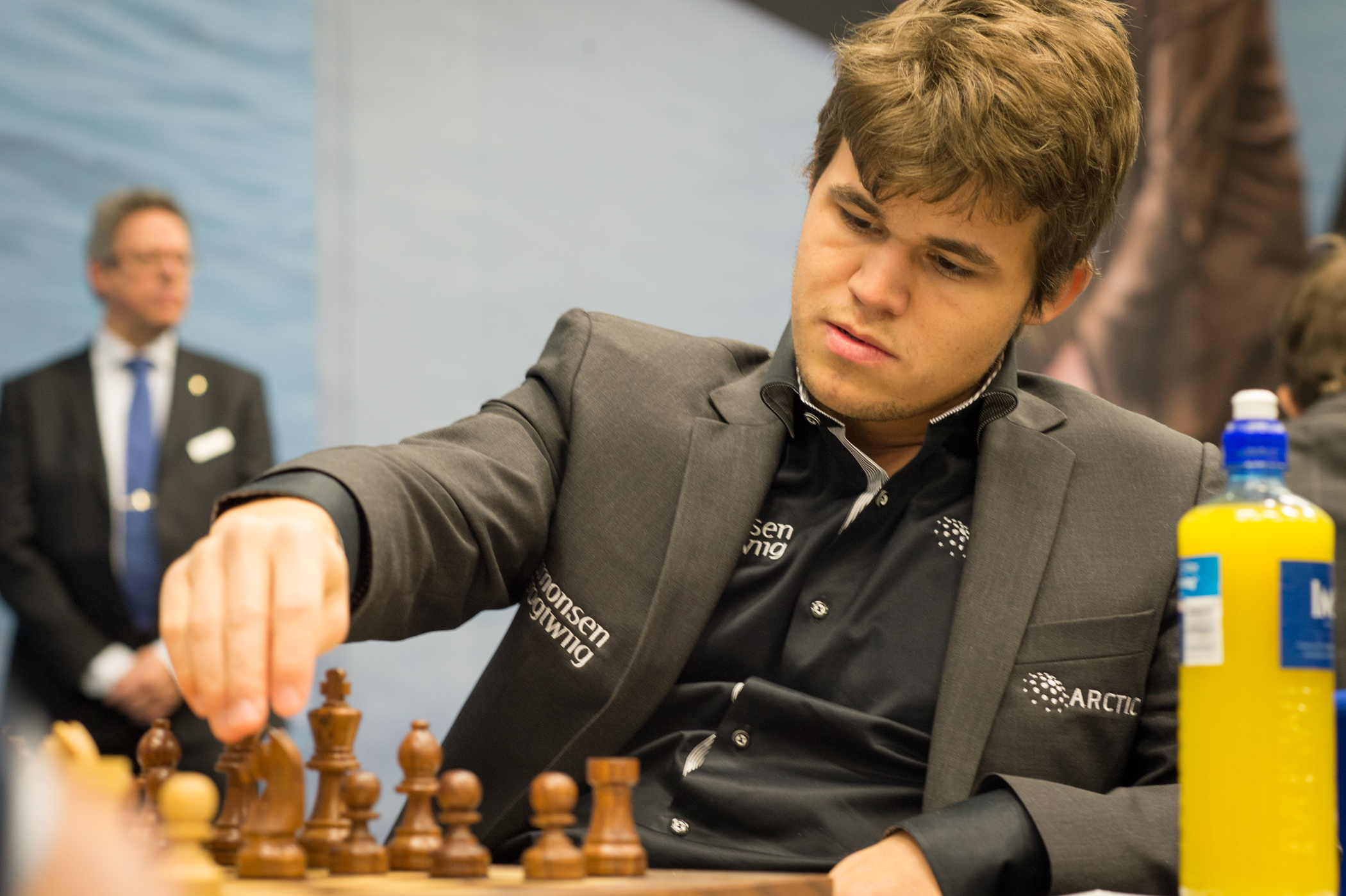
- Magnus Carlsen, pictured at the 2013 event
- Location: Wijk aan Zee, Netherlands
- Dates: 16–31 January 2016
- Competitors: 28
- Winning score: 9 points of 13

Champion
- (Norway) Magnus Carlsen (Masters) (India) Adhiban Baskaran (Challengers)

The Tata Steel Chess Tournament 2016 was the 78th edition of the Tata Steel Chess Tournament. It was held in Wijk aan Zee (with away days in Amsterdam and Utrecht) from 16 to 31 January 2016.

The tournament was won by Magnus Carlsen who finished on 9/13 and earned his fifth victory, drawing level with Viswanathan Anand for most wins in the event.

78th Tata Steel Masters, 16–31 January 2016, Wijk aan Zee — Amsterdam — Utrecht, Netherlands, Category XX (2748)
	Player	Rating	1	2	3	4	5	6	7	8	9	10	11	12	13	14	Total	SB	TPR
1	Magnus Carlsen (Norway)	2844		½	½	½	½	1	½	½	½	½	1	1	1	1	9		2881
2	Fabiano Caruana (United States)	2787	½		1	½	½	1	1	½	½	0	0	½	1	1	8	51.75	2831
3	Ding Liren (China)	2766	½	0		½	½	1	½	½	1	½	1	½	1	½	8	49.25	2833
4	Wesley So (United States)	2773	½	½	½		1	½	½	½	½	½	½	½	½	½	7	45.50	2775
5	Anish Giri (Netherlands)	2798	½	½	½	0		½	½	1	½	½	½	½	½	1	7	44.25	2773
6	Pavel Eljanov (Ukraine)	2760	0	0	0	½	½		½	1	½	1	½	1	½	1	7	40.50	2776
7	Wei Yi (China)	2706	½	0	½	½	½	½		½	½	1	½	½	½	½	6½	41.00	2751
8	Shakhriyar Mamedyarov (Azerbaijan)	2747	½	½	½	½	0	0	½		½	½	½	1	1	½	6½	40.25	2748
9	Sergey Karjakin (Russia)	2769	½	½	0	½	½	½	½	½		½	1	½	0	½	6		2716
10	David Navara (Czech Republic)	2730	½	1	½	½	½	0	0	½	½		½	0	½	½	5½	37.50	2692
11	Evgeny Tomashevsky (Russia)	2728	0	1	0	½	½	½	½	½	0	½		½	½	½	5½	35.25	2692
12	Hou Yifan (China)	2673	0	½	½	½	½	0	½	0	½	1	½		½	0	5	32.00	2666
13	Michael Adams (England)	2744	0	0	0	½	½	½	½	0	1	½	½	½		½	5	30.25	2661
14	Loek van Wely (Netherlands)	2640	0	0	½	½	0	0	½	½	½	½	½	1	½		5	30.00	2669

2016 Tata Steel Challengers, 16–31 January 2016, Wijk aan Zee, Netherlands, Category XIII (2569)
	Player	Rating	1	2	3	4	5	6	7	8	9	10	11	12	13	14	Total	SB	TPR
1	GM Adhiban Baskaran (India)	2653		1	1	½	½	½	0	1	½	½	1	½	1	1	9	56.25	2704
2	GM Eltaj Safarli (Azerbaijan)	2653	0		½	1	1	½	1	½	½	1	½	1	½	1	9	53.50	2704
3	GM Alexey Dreev (Russia)	2644	0	½		1	1	½	½	½	½	1	1	1	½	1	9	53.25	2705
4	GM Benjamin Bok (Netherlands)	2607	½	0	0		½	½	0	½	1	½	1	½	1	1	7	39.25	2595
5	GM Mikhail Antipov (Russia)	2567	½	0	0	½		½	1	½	1	0	0	1	1	1	7	39.00	2598
6	GM Liviu-Dieter Nisipeanu (Germany)	2679	½	½	½	½	½		½	½	½	½	½	1	½	0	6½	43.75	2561
7	IM Jorden van Foreest (Netherlands)	2541	1	0	½	1	0	½		0	1	1	0	0	½	1	6½	41.00	2571
8	GM Nijat Abasov (Azerbaijan)	2556	0	½	½	½	½	½	1		½	0	1	0	½	1	6½	39.25	2570
9	GM Erwin l'Ami (Netherlands)	2627	½	½	½	0	0	½	0	½		1	½	½	1	1	6½	38.50	2565
10	GM Samuel Sevian (United States)	2578	½	0	0	½	1	½	0	1	0		1	1	0	1	6½	37.75	2569
11	GM Ju Wenjun (China)	2548	0	½	0	0	1	½	1	0	½	0		½	1	1	6		2542
12	IM Nino Batsiashvili (Georgia)	2485	½	0	0	½	0	0	1	1	½	0	½		1	0	5		2489
13	IM Miguoel Admiraal (Netherlands)	2441	0	½	½	0	0	½	½	½	0	1	0	0		1	4½		2469
14	WGM Anne Haast (Netherlands)	2391	0	0	0	0	0	1	0	0	0	0	0	1	0		2		2287
