= Tata Steel Chess Tournament 2015 =

Chess tournament 2015

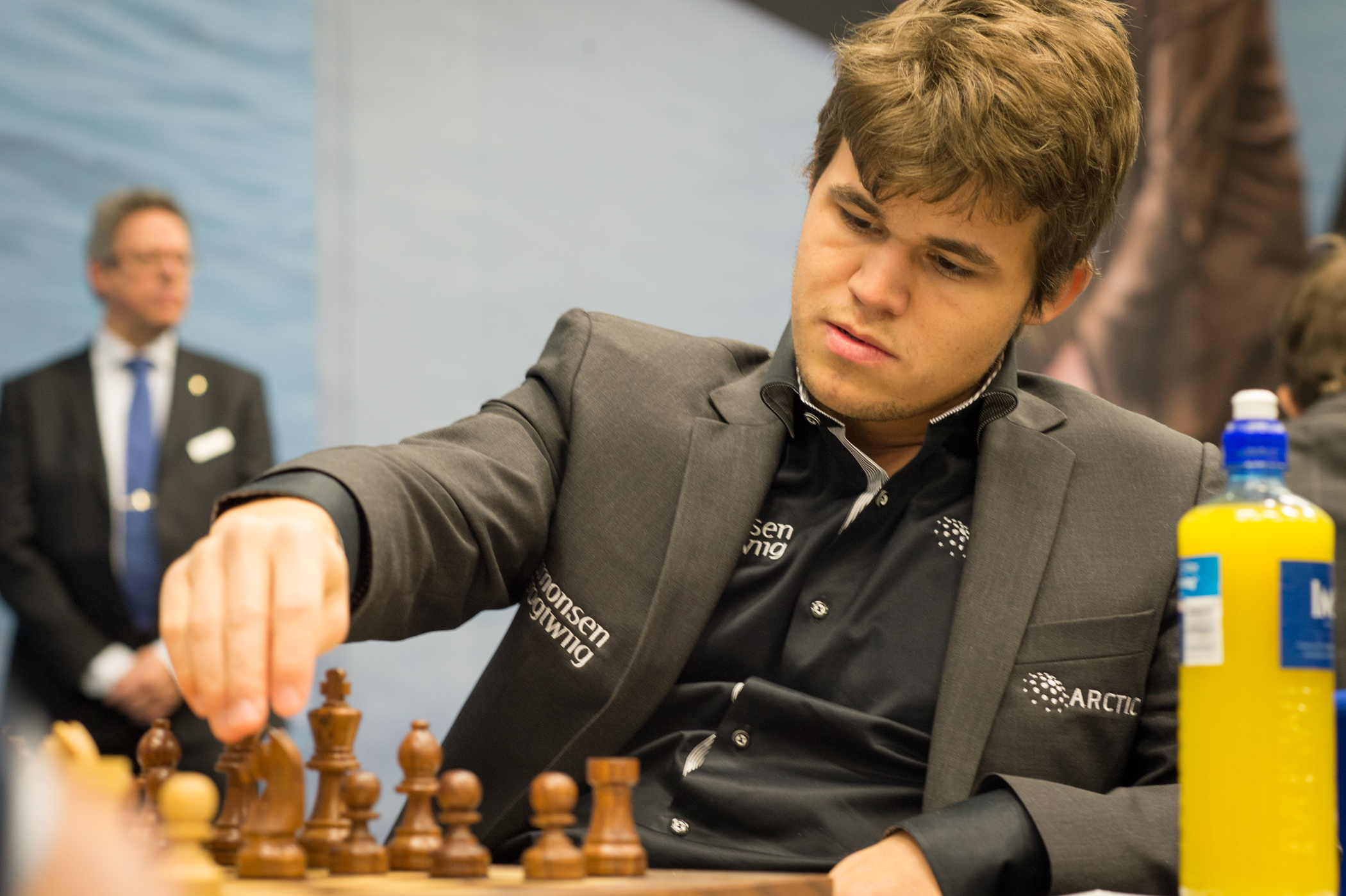
- Magnus Carlsen, pictured at the 2013 event
- Location: Wijk aan Zee, Netherlands
- Dates: 10–25 January 2015
- Competitors: 28
- Winning score: 9 points of 13

Champion
- (Norway) Magnus Carlsen (Masters) (China) Wei Yi (Challengers)

The Tata Steel Chess Tournament 2015 was the 77th edition of the Tata Steel Chess Tournament. It was held in Wijk aan Zee (with away days in Rotterdam and The Hague) from 10 to 25 January 2015.

The tournament was won by Magnus Carlsen who finished on 9/13, winning the title for the fourth time.

77th Tata Steel Masters, 10–25 January 2015, Wijk aan Zee — Rotterdam — The Hague, Netherlands, Category XX (2746)
	Player	Rating	1	2	3	4	5	6	7	8	9	10	11	12	13	14	Total	SB	TPR
1	Magnus Carlsen (Norway)	2862		½	½	½	½	½	1	1	0	1	1	½	1	1	9		2878
2	Maxime Vachier-Lagrave (France)	2757	½		1	½	1	0	1	½	½	½	1	1	½	½	8½	54.25	2855
3	Anish Giri (Netherlands)	2784	½	0		1	1	½	½	½	½	½	½	1	1	1	8½	51.25	2853
4	Wesley So (United States)	2762	½	½	0		½	1	½	½	½	1	½	1	1	1	8½	49.25	2854
5	Ding Liren (China)	2732	½	0	0	½		½	0	1	1	1	1	1	1	1	8½	46.00	2857
6	Vasyl Ivanchuk (Ukraine)	2715	½	1	½	0	½		½	½	½	½	½	½	1	1	7½		2805
7	Fabiano Caruana (Italy)	2820	0	0	½	½	1	½		½	0	½	½	1	1	1	7		2769
8	Teimour Radjabov (Azerbaijan)	2734	0	½	½	½	0	½	½		1	½	½	1	½	0	6		2718
9	Radosław Wojtaszek (Poland)	2744	1	½	½	½	0	½	1	0		½	½	0	½	0	5½	39.75	2689
10	Levon Aronian (Armenia)	2797	0	½	½	0	0	½	½	½	½		½	½	½	1	5½	31.25	2685
11	Hou Yifan (China)	2673	0	0	½	½	0	½	½	½	½	½		½	0	1	5		2664
12	Ivan Šarić (Croatia)	2666	½	0	0	0	0	½	0	0	1	½	½		½	1	4½		2642
13	Loek van Wely (Netherlands)	2667	0	½	0	0	0	0	0	½	½	½	1	½		½	4		2611
14	Baadur Jobava (Georgia)	2727	0	½	0	0	0	0	0	1	1	0	0	0	½		3		2536

2015 Tata Steel Challengers, 10–25 January 2015, Wijk aan Zee, Netherlands, Category XIII (2561)
	Player	Rating	1	2	3	4	5	6	7	8	9	10	11	12	13	14	Total	SB	TPR
1	GM Wei Yi (China)	2675		½	½	½	½	1	1	1	1	1	1	1	½	1	10½		2804
2	GM David Navara (Czech Republic)	2729	½		½	1	1	½	½	½	½	1	1	1	1	1	10		2760
3	GM Sam Shankland (United States)	2652	½	½		1	½	½	½	1	½	1	1	1	½	½	9		2695
4	GM Robin van Kampen (Netherlands)	2615	½	0	0		0	1	1	½	1	1	½	1	1	1	8½		2667
5	GM Salem Saleh (United Arab Emirates)	2603	½	0	½	1		½	½	0	0	1	1	½	1	1	7½	43.00	2615
6	GM Samuel Sevian (United States)	2511	0	½	½	0	½		1	½	1	0	1	1	½	1	7½	41.75	2622
7	GM Vladimir Potkin (Russia)	2608	0	½	½	0	½	0		½	1	½	1	1	½	1	7		2587
8	GM Erwin l'Ami (Netherlands)	2613	0	½	0	½	1	½	½		0	1	½	½	1	½	6½		2557
9	GM Valentina Gunina (Russia)	2538	0	½	½	0	1	0	0	1		½	0	0	½	1	5		2476
10	GM Bart Michiels (Belgium)	2563	0	0	0	0	0	1	½	0	½		0	1	1	½	4½	22.50	2451
11	GM David Klein (Netherlands)	2517	0	0	0	½	0	0	0	½	1	1		½	½	½	4½	22.25	2455
12	WIM Anne Haast (Netherlands)	2485	0	0	0	0	½	0	0	½	1	0	½		½	1	4		2437
13	IM Ari Dale (Australia)	2291	½	0	½	0	0	½	½	0	½	0	½	½		0	3½		2407
14	GM Jan Timman (Netherlands)	2593	0	0	½	0	0	0	0	½	0	½	½	0	1		3		2348
