= Fabiano Caruana =

Italian and American chess grandmaster (born 1992)

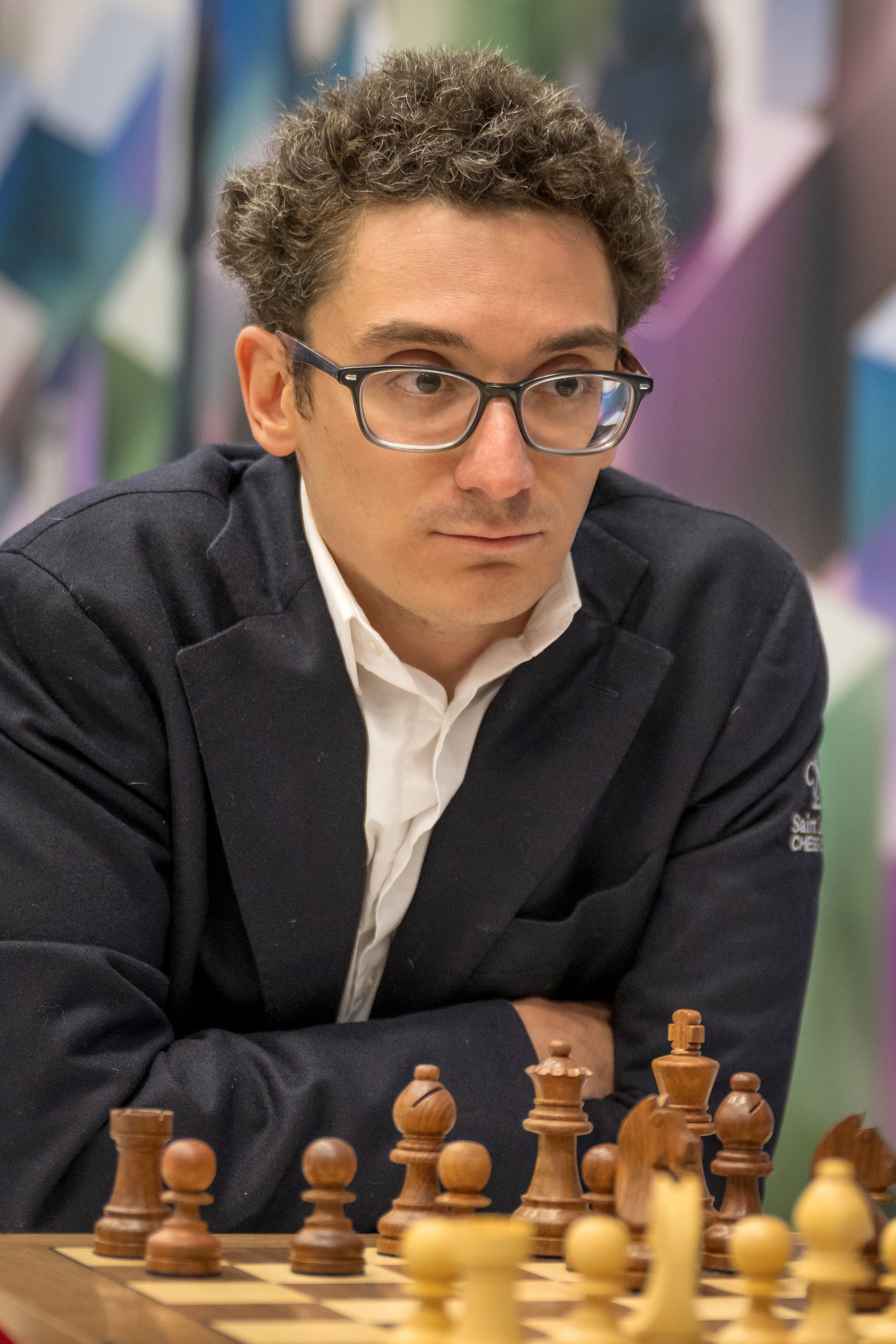
- Caruana at the 2025 Tata Steel Masters

Personal information
- Born: Fabiano Luigi Caruana; July 30, 1992 (age 34) Miami, Florida, U.S.

Chess career
- Country: United States (pre-2005; since 2015); Italy (2005–2015)
- Title: Grandmaster (2007)
- FIDE rating: 2783 (November 2026)
- Peak rating: 2844 (October 2014)
- Ranking: No. 3 (November 2026)
- Peak ranking: No. 2 (October 2014)

Fabiano Luigi Caruana (born July 30, 1992) is an Italian and American chess grandmaster. A five-time United States Chess Champion, two-times Grand Chess Tour champion and a World Championship runner up. With a peak rating of 2844, Caruana is the third-highest-rated player in history only behind Garry Kasparov and Magnus Carlsen.

Born in Miami to Italian parents, Caruana grew up in Brooklyn. A chess prodigy, Caruana played for the United States until 2005, when he transferred his national federation affiliation to Italy. He earned his grandmaster title in 2007 at the age of 14, and in the same year won his first Italian Chess Championship, a feat he repeated in 2008, 2010, and 2011. In 2014, Caruana won the Sinquefield Cup, recording a 3098 performance rating, the highest in history at the elite level. He transferred his national federation affiliation back to the United States in 2015, and in 2016, won the US Chess Championship.

By winning the FIDE Grand Prix 2014–15, Caruana qualified for the Candidates Tournament 2016, where he placed second after Sergey Karjakin. He won the following Candidates Tournament 2018, becoming the first American challenger for the undisputed World Chess Championship since Bobby Fischer in 1972. In the run-up to the championship match, he won the Grenke Chess Classic, Norway Chess, and shared first in the Sinquefield Cup. Caruana lost the World Chess Championship to Magnus Carlsen in the rapid tiebreaks after drawing all twelve of the classical games. He proceeded to qualify and participate in all following Candidates Tournaments: 2020, 2022, 2024, and 2026. In 2025, he signed to esports organization Team Liquid. Caruana also finished runner-up in the 2026 FIDE Freestyle Chess World Championship to Carlsen.

Caruana represented the United States on board one at the 42nd Chess Olympiad, winning team gold and individual bronze. In addition to classical chess, Caruana is highly ranked in rapid and blitz.

== Personal life and chess beginnings ==
Caruana was born on July 30, 1992, in Miami, Florida, to Italian parents, Lou and Santina Caruana. He is a dual citizen of Italy and the United States. When he was four, his family relocated from Miami to the Park Slope neighborhood of Brooklyn in New York City. When he was five, his chess talent was discovered in an after-school chess program at Congregation Beth Elohim, a reform Jewish congregation in Park Slope. That year he played his first tournament at the Polgar Chess Center in Kew Gardens, Queens.

Until the age of twelve, he lived and played in the United States, occasionally traveling to Europe and South America to participate in tournaments. His first chess coach, from age six to eight, was National Master (NM) Bruce Pandolfini, and from age eight to twelve, he studied with GM Miron Sher. In 2004, he relocated with his family from Brooklyn to Madrid, Spain to pursue a professional chess career, playing for Italy from 2005 to 2015. He trained with International Master (IM) Boris Zlotnik in Madrid, and in 2007 he moved to Budapest to train with grandmaster Alexander Chernin. In 2010, he moved to Lugano, Switzerland, and, at the end of that year, started to train with grandmaster Vladimir Chuchelov. He moved to St. Louis, Missouri, in 2014.

== Chess career ==
=== 2007 ===
In July, Caruana won the "First Saturday" GM tournament in Budapest with seven points out of nine games. He obtained his final GM norm and at age 14 years, 11 months, and 20 days, became the youngest grandmaster of both the United States and Italy, surpassing the US record set by Hikaru Nakamura. Caruana played the strong Vlissingen chess tournament in the Netherlands in August. His last round opponent was former FIDE world champion Rustam Kasimdzhanov. Caruana, playing black, drew the game in 82 moves, and won the tournament with a performance of 2715. In November and December, Caruana participated in the Italian Championship. In 2006, he was the co-champion of Italy by tying with Michele Godena but losing the fifth rapid play-off game. In 2007, he won with a score of +8 (9½/11) to become the youngest ever Italian champion.

=== 2008 ===
In January, Caruana had his first experience at Corus C and throughout much of the tournament he was the clear leader. His last round opponent was Parimarjan Negi, and Caruana needed ½ point to win the tournament. Caruana won the game in 61 moves and the tournament with a final score of +7 (10/13) and performance of 2696. April saw him playing in the Ruy Lopez Festival which included a seven-round closed tournament, and a two-day rapid open tournament. In the seven round closed tournament, Caruana had a disappointing result of −2 (2½/7) with performance of 2513. The two-day rapid open tournament that followed was won by Caruana with a score of +6 (7½/9) followed by Michael Adams, Julio Granda Zuniga, and Djurabek Khamrakulov all with a score of +5 (7/9). In June Caruana played first board for Italy at the Mitropa Cup, which is a four-board team competition amongst 10 "middle" European nations. He scored +6 (7½/9) winning the first board prize with performance of 2810. In August the NH Chess Tournament "Rising Stars vs. Experienced" was played with Scheveningen format which is a double round team match of five "Rising Stars" against five "Experienced" players. Caruana played against Evgeny Bareev, Viktor Korchnoi, Artur Jussupow, Simen Agdestein, and Ljubomir Ljubojević. He scored +3 (6½/10) with performance of 2706. In October and November: Caruana played at Eighth Cap d'Agde Rapid Chess Tournament, held in Cap d'Agde, a knock-out closed rapid tournament organized into two round robin groups of eight players each, with the top four scorers of each group proceeding to the quarter-finals, the semi-finals, and then the finals. The time control was 25 minutes with a 10-second increment. In his group, Caruana placed first with a score of +4 (5½/7) winning against Maxime Vachier-Lagrave, Xiangzhi Bu, Alexandra Kosteniuk, Marie Sebag, and drawing against Vasyl Ivanchuk, Ivan Cheparinov, and Kateryna Lagno. Caruana's performance was 2866 and he had qualified to enter the quarter-finals. His quarter-final match, which was against Anatoly Karpov, was closely fought. Karpov won the first game, and Caruana won the second. Then tie-break games with time control of 15 minutes were played. The first four games were all drawn. The fifth game Karpov won, and Caruana was knocked out. In November Caruana played at 38th Olympiad, his first Olympiad. On the first board for Italy he played against Levon Aronian in the first round, Viktor Korchnoi in the fourth round, Michael Adams in the fifth round, Emanuel Berg in the seventh round, and Peter Leko in the eighth round. He lost to Aronian and Leko, and won against Adams, Korchnoi, and Berg. His final score was 7½/11 with performance of 2696. When winter rolled around in November and December, Caruana successfully defended his title winning the Italian Championship for the second consecutive year with a score of +5 (8/11).

=== 2009 ===
In February, Caruana—having won Corus C 2008—received and accepted invitation to Corus B 2009 which was of category 16 with average Elo of 2641. Throughout the tournament his standings ranged from first to third place. Going into the last round he was tied for second and his opponent was Nigel Short who was in clear first. The game lasted 67 moves. Caruana won the game and the tournament with a score of +4 (8½/13) and performance of 2751. Caruana is the first player ever to win both Corus C and Corus B in consecutive years placing clear first in both. In April he played in the Russian Team Championship at Sochi with the "Club 64" of Moscow, scoring 5 points out of 6; his team placed second after Tomsk. In May he played with the Italian team in the "Mitropa Cup" at Rogaska Slatina in Slovenia, scoring 6 points out of 8 and winning the individual gold medal on first board. By November Caruana was entered in and played in the Chess World Cup 2009 at Khanty-Mansiysk in Russia. In the first two rounds he beat the Cuban grandmasters Lázaro Bruzón and Leinier Domínguez (Elo 2719), in the third the Russian Evgeny Alekseev (Elo 2715); in round four he lost, only in the rapid games, to Vugar Gashimov (Elo 2759 and 7th in the world). This performance allowed him to reach 2675 Elo points.

=== 2010 ===
In July, Caruana won the Young Grandmaster Section of Biel 2010 after a playoff with the others two leaders Maxime Vachier-Lagrave and Nguyễn Ngọc Trường Sơn. In December he won the Italian Championship for the third time with a score of 9 points out of 11 games. In the period from December 2010–January 2011 Caruana played in the 53rd Reggio Emilia Tournament. He placed 6th out of 10 and tied 7 out of his 9 games (only winning, again, against Nigel Short).

=== 2011 ===
In January, at the Gibraltar Masters, he finished on place 5 behind Ivanchuk, Short, Külaots and Roiz. In July, he won with 7 points out of 10 at the AAI tournament in New Delhi (category 17). In December he won the Italian National Championship for the fourth time with a score of 10 points out of 11 games. He had previously won the 2007 and 2008 national championships, and did not play the 2009 national championship due to a calendar conflict with the FIDE World Cup.

=== 2012 ===
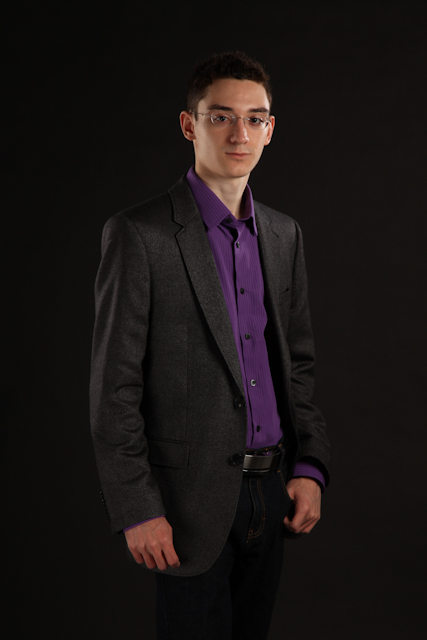
Caruana in 2012

In January, at the 74th Tata Steel Chess Tournament A in Wijk aan Zee (previously known as Corus Chess), he finished on place second together with Magnus Carlsen and Teimour Radjabov, behind the winner Levon Aronian. In March at the 27th Reykjavik Open in Reykjavík, Iceland, he finished first with 7½/9. In May he won the 20th Sigeman & Co Chess Tournament, an eight-player round-robin tournament, in Malmö, Sweden, with 5½/7, half point ahead of Peter Leko. June saw him at the 7th Tal Memorial where he finished second with a score of 5½/9 after tiebreak with Teimour Radjabov behind Magnus Carlsen. By July, at the 40th Dortmund Sparkassen Chess Meeting, he was victorious once again with a score of 6/9 after tiebreak with Sergey Karjakin. In the fall, in the period from September–October, he played in the Grand Slam Chess Final in São Paulo and Bilbao, Caruana won 4 games, drew 5 and lost 1, tying for 1st with Magnus Carlsen, but eventually losing both blitz tiebreak games and thus ending 2nd. In November at the 6th Kings Tournament, organized in Bucharest by the Romanian capital chess club, Caruana tied all the games to get third in a shortlist, yet strong tournament (average Elo 2747) behind Vasyl Ivanchuk, winner, and Veselin Topalov, runner-up.

=== 2013 ===
In February–March, Caruana won with four points out of six games the Zurich Chess Challenge. In April at the third stage of the FIDE Grand Prix Series 2012–2013 held in Zug, Switzerland, with six points out of 11 games, Caruana shared third place with Ruslan Ponomariov, behind the winner, Veselin Topalov, and the runner-up, Hikaru Nakamura. In May–June at the fourth stage of the "FIDE Grand Prix Series 2012–2013" held in Thessaloniki, Greece, Caruana shared second place with Gata Kamsky, behind the winner, Leinier Domínguez Pérez. In June at the eighth edition of the Tal Memorial Chess Tournament, held in Moscow, Caruana, with five points out of nine games, finished third after tiebreak with Shakhriyar Mamedyarov and Dmitry Andreikin, behind the winner, Boris Gelfand, and the runner-up, Magnus Carlsen. In September–October he shared first place with Boris Gelfand with 5 points out 9 games at the sixth leg of the FIDE Grand Prix, held in Paris. In the final game against Dominguez Perez, Caruana had to win with the black pieces to hope to win the tournament solo and qualify for the Candidate's Tournament, but he repeated moves early in the opening finishing with a fast draw. In October he won the seventh edition of the Kings Tournament in Bucharest, Romania, with five points out of eight games.

=== 2014 ===
In January, at the Tata Steel Chess Tournament in Wijk aan Zee, Netherlands, Caruana finished fourth with 6 points out 11 games. In the end of January into early February, at the Zurich Chess Challenge in Zürich, Switzerland, Caruana won the rapid section with four points out of five games and shared second place with Levon Aronian in combined final results (classical and rapid time controls), behind the winner Magnus Carlsen. In April at Shamkir Chess 2014, a six-player double round-robin tournament held in Shamkir, Azerbaijan, in memory of Vugar Gashimov, Caruana finished second with 5½ points out of 10 games, behind the winner Magnus Carlsen. In June at Norway Chess 2014, a ten-player tournament, Caruana finished fourth with 4½ points out of 9 games. In June at the FIDE World Rapid Championship held in Dubai, Caruana finished second with 10½ points out of 15 games, after tiebreaks with Viswanathan Anand, Levon Aronian and Alexander Morozevich, half point behind the winner Magnus Carlsen. With this result Caruana in July topped the FIDE rapid ranking with 2858 points. In FIDE World Blitz Championship, also held in Dubai, Caruana finished in the middle of the group, confirming some difficulties with short time control. In July, Caruana won with 5½ points out of 7 games the Dortmund Sparkassen Chess Meeting, breaking for the first time the 2800 Elo points bar. By August Caruana was playing on the first board for Italy at the 41st Chess Olympiad in Tromsø, Norway, finishing with 6½ points out of 9 games. In the period from August–September, Caruana won with 8½ points out of 10 games the Sinquefield Cup in Saint Louis, Missouri, one of the strongest tournaments ever held, featuring six of the world's top ten players, including the world champion Magnus Carlsen. With seven consecutive wins from the start, 3 draws and 0 losses, Caruana ultimately achieved a performance rating of 3098, the best tournament result in history at that time, beating out Magnus Carlsen in the 2009 Nanjing Pearl Spring tournament and Anatoly Karpov in the 1994 Linares chess tournament. This helped him reach his peak rating of 2844. In October he won along with Boris Gelfand the Baku stage of the FIDE Grand Prix 2014–15, a 12-player round-robin, with 6½ points out of 11 games. The loss at round 7 against Dmitry Andreikin ended a streak of 22 points out of 27 games and no losses started in August. In the period of late October through early November, Caruana shared fourth place with six points out of 11 games at the Tashkent leg of the FIDE Grand Prix. December saw him at the 6th London Chess Classic, a six-player round-robin; he shared last place with four draws and one loss in five games.

=== 2015 ===
In January, Caruana played in the Tata Steel Chess Tournament, a 14-player round-robin, where he finished seventh, with seven points out 13 games, behind the winner Magnus Carlsen. In February he was at the 2015 Grenke Chess Classic in Baden-Baden, an eight-player round-robin. He shared third and fourth positions, with four points out seven games, behind the winner Magnus Carlsen. In February at 2015 Zurich Chess Challenge, a 6 players tournament, Caruana shared second place in Blitz Section with 3½ points out 5 games, shared the last place with 2 points out of 5 games in Classical Section, finished last with 1½ points out 5 games in Rapid Section and finished fifth in Combined Final Results (Classical & Rapid TC) behind the winner Hikaru Nakamura. In April at the Shamkir Chess 2015, a 10 players tournament, Caruana finished fourth with five points out of nine games behind the winner Magnus Carlsen. In May, Caruana won along with Hikaru Nakamura and Dmitry Jakovenko the FIDE Grand Prix Khanty-Mansiysk 2015, a 12-player round-robin, with 6½ points out of 11 games. With this result Caruana won the FIDE Grand Prix 2014–15 and qualified for the 2016 Candidates Tournament. In June he played in the Norway Chess 2015, a 10-player tournament, where he finished fifth with 4 points out of 9 games behind the winner Veselin Topalov. In June–July: Caruana won the Dortmund Sparkassen Chess Meeting, an eight-player single-round robin tournament, with 5½ points out of 7 possible points, ending the tournament with a 5-game win-streak. In August–September he finished 8th at the 2015 Sinquefield Cup with 3½ out of nine possible points. In September, at the Chess World Cup 2015, a 128-player single-elimination tournament, Caruana was eliminated in the fourth round by Shakhriyar Mamedyarov. In December, Caruana competed in the final leg of the Grand Chess Tour, the London Chess Classic. He achieved the arguably boring result of nine draws out of nine games (+0-0=9).

=== 2016 ===
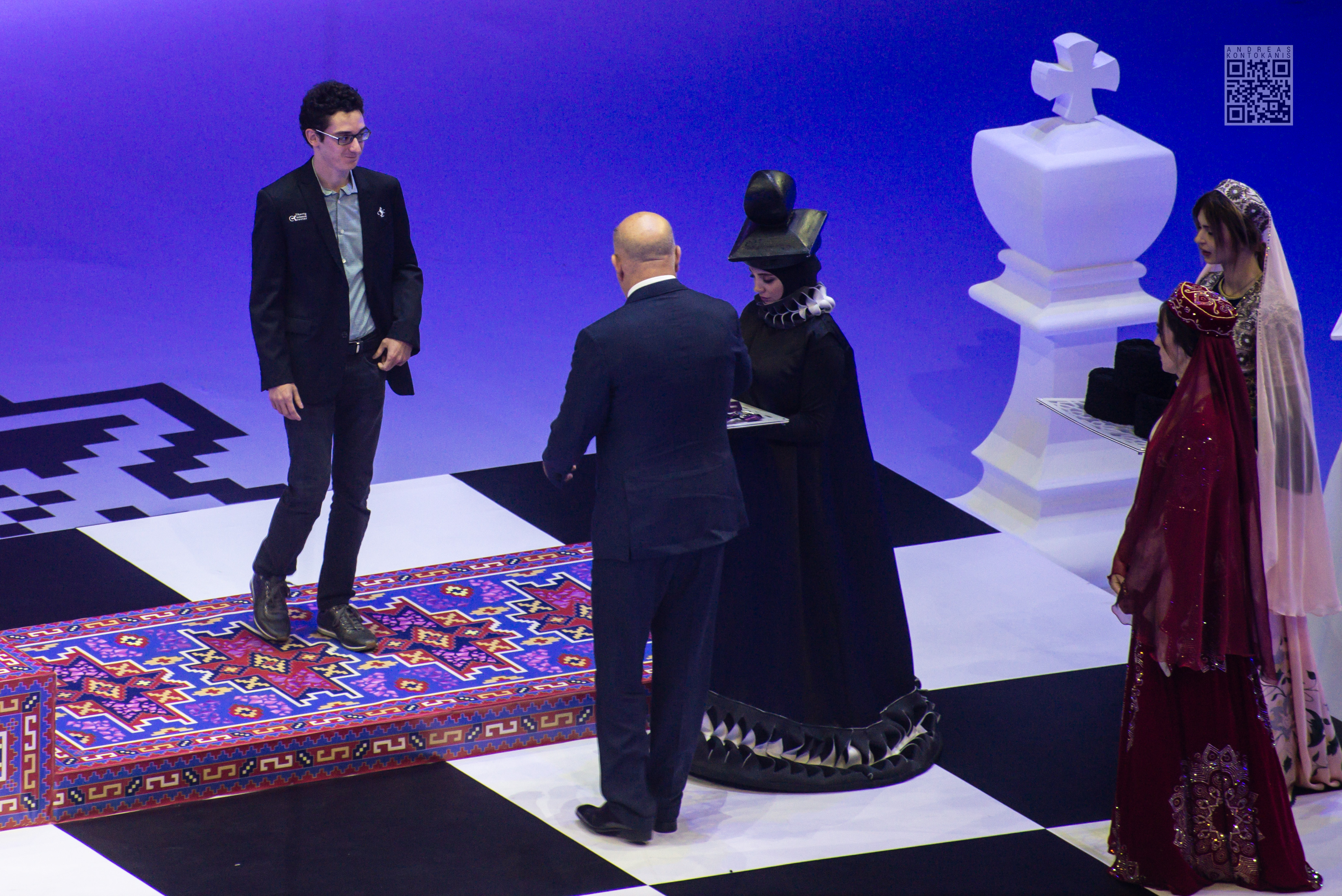
Caruana receives the bronze medal for Board 1 at the Chess Olympiad.

In January, at the Tata Steel Chess Tournament, Caruana shared second (along with Ding Liren) with a score of 8 points out of 13 (+5-2=6), defeating Michael Adams, Wei Yi, Loek Van Wely, Pavel Eljanov, and Ding Liren, and losing to David Navara and Evgeny Tomashevsky. Had he defeated Tomashevsky, he would have at least tied for 1st place with Magnus Carlsen. Through this tournament, he gained 7 rating points and moved to #3 in the world. By March, as part of the qualification cycle for the World Chess Championship 2016, Caruana participated in the Candidates Tournament 2016, held in Moscow, Russia, from March 10–30 in the Central Telegraph (Центральный телеграф) Building. The lineup of the tournament included Viswanathan Anand, Hikaru Nakamura, Sergey Karjakin, Peter Svidler, Veselin Topalov, Anish Giri, and Levon Aronian. In the final round Caruana had Black against Sergey Karjakin in a winner-takes-all game. A complex position developed in which he made a mistake and was eventually defeated, making Karjakin the official challenger. Caruana eventually finished with a +1 score. On April 25, Caruana became US Chess Champion for the first time, after defeating IM Akshat Chandra in the last round of the US Chess Championship. He finished the tournament with 8.5 points out of 11 games, and went undefeated. The field consisted of world top ten players Hikaru Nakamura and Wesley So; top 100 players Ray Robson, Sam Shankland, Gata Kamsky, and Alexander Onischuk; GMs Alexander Shabalov, Varuzhan Akobian, Jeffery Xiong and Aleksandr Lenderman; and IM Akshat Chandra. In September, he played first board of the US Team at the 42nd Chess Olympiad. The US team won the gold medal, while Caruana won the bronze medal for first board.

=== 2017 ===
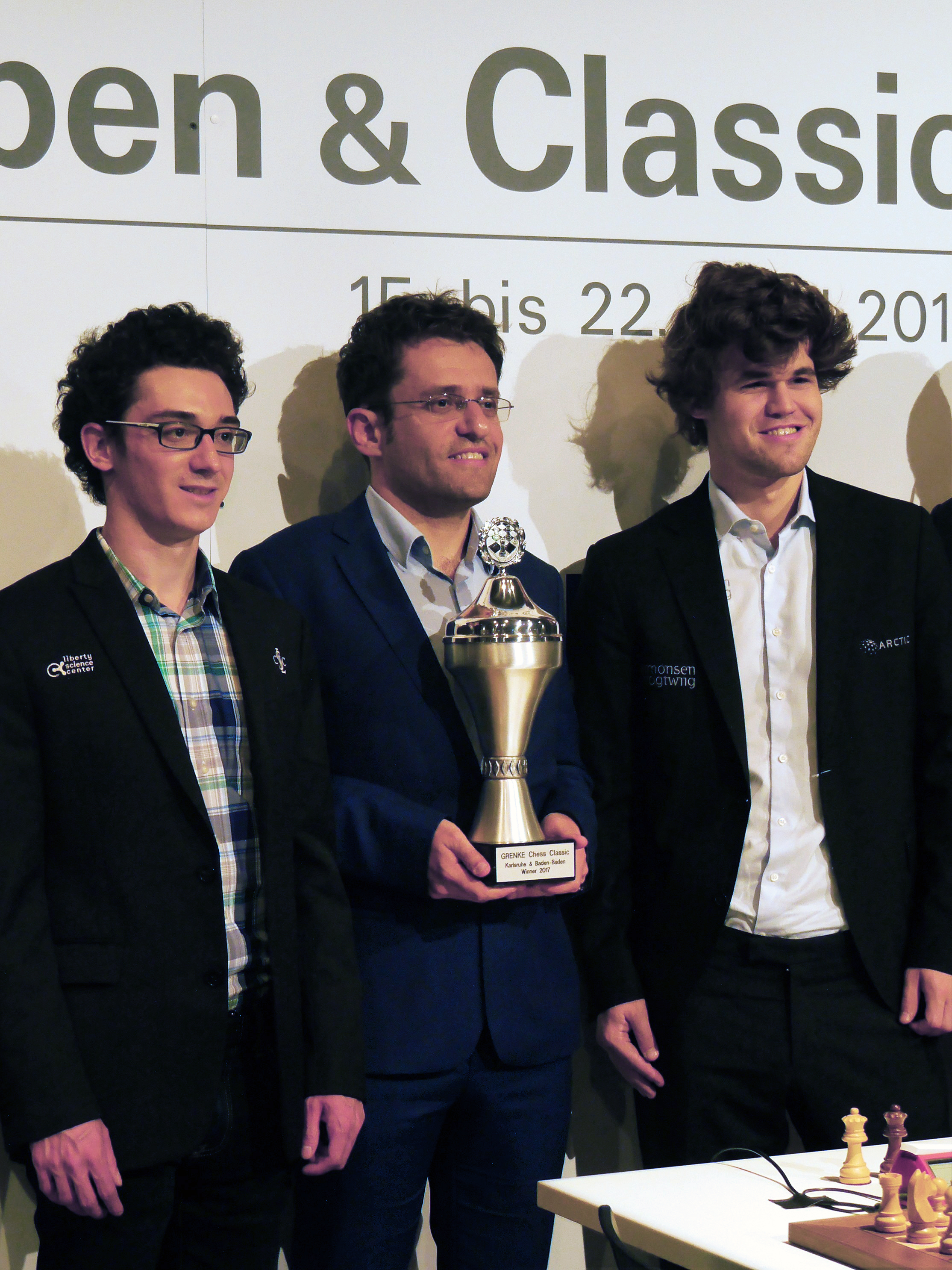
The top 3 finishers at the Grenke Chess Classic, Fabiano Caruana, Levon Aronian, and Magnus Carlsen

Caruana began the year rated 2827, ranked No. 2 in the world. However, his rating would slip in the coming months. He played the Tradewise Gibraltar Chess Festival in March and finished with a score of 7/10, suffering one loss to Nigel Short in Round 6. At the US Championships, Caruana finished T-3rd with 6/11. He lost two games during the tournament and needed to win his last two games just to finish with a positive score, which he did. At the conclusion, his ranking dropped to No. 4. He finished T-2nd at the Grenke Chess Classic, but was 1½ points behind the winner Levon Aronian. Caruana next played in the Norway Chess event, where he finished in the middle of the standings with 4½/9. His lone win came against Hikaru Nakamura and his lone loss came against Vishwanathan Anand.

Caruana continued to struggle through the middle of the year. He finished the Sinquefield Cup in July towards the bottom of the standings with a score of 4/9 (+1-2=6). His last round loss to Peter Svidler knocked his August rating below 2800 for the first time since April 2016. At the World Cup, Caruana made it to the third round. Evgeniy Najer eliminated him in the rapid tiebreak rounds by winning with the black pieces. The World Cup tightened the race between Caruana, Wesley So, and Vladimir Kramnik for the two ratings qualification spots to the 2018 Candidates Tournament to within a few points. However, Kramnik's loss in a classical game against Ivanchuk during the tournament left him in a distant third with only two months remaining.

The World Cup set the stage for the next major tournament, the Isle of Man Open, which both Caruana and Kramnik were playing. The first round pairings were decided by the players drawing names out of a raffle tumbler. Kramnik, choosing second because he was the 2nd-highest rated player at the event, chose Caruana as his first round opponent. With the white pieces, Caruana defeated Kramnik to put himself and So in a good position to qualify for the Candidates Tournament. Kramnik's surprise loss to James Tarjan, who quit chess for a few decades to become a librarian, further helped solidify Caruana and So as the ratings qualifiers. Furthermore, Kramnik ended up receiving a wild card into the Candidates event, officially clinching the qualifications for Caruana and So.

In December 2017 with the Candidates qualification already decided, Caruana rebounded and won his only tournament of the year at the London Chess Classic in tiebreaks. He won three games and drew the remaining six (+3-0=6). Ian Nepomniachtchi had the sole lead entering the final round after winning three consecutive games in rounds six through eight. However, Caruana was able to come from behind by defeating Michael Adams in his last game. After drawing the rapid tiebreaks, Caruana won one of the two blitz games to clinch the tournament.

=== 2018 ===
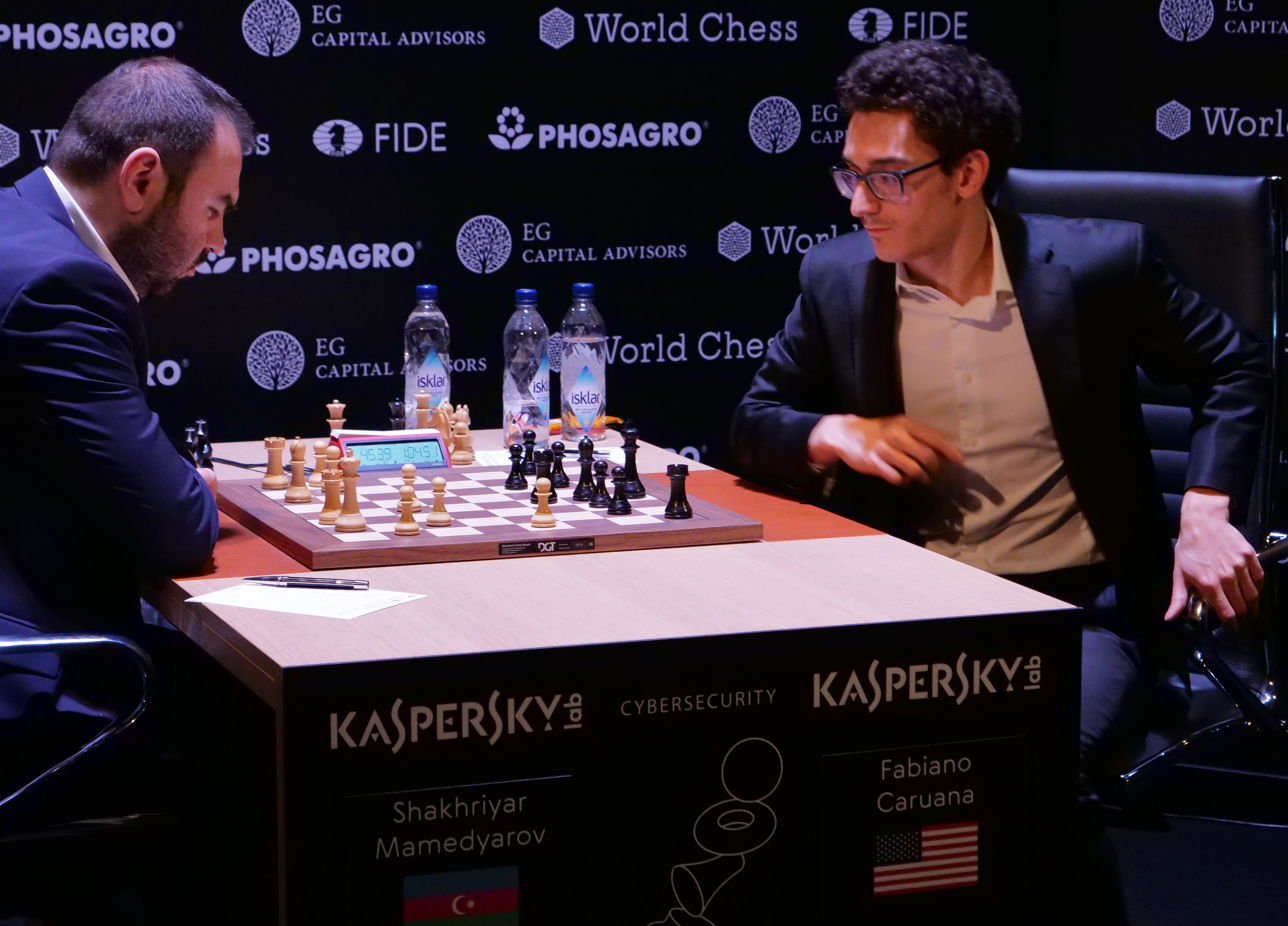
Caruana vs. Mamedyarov at the Candidates Tournament

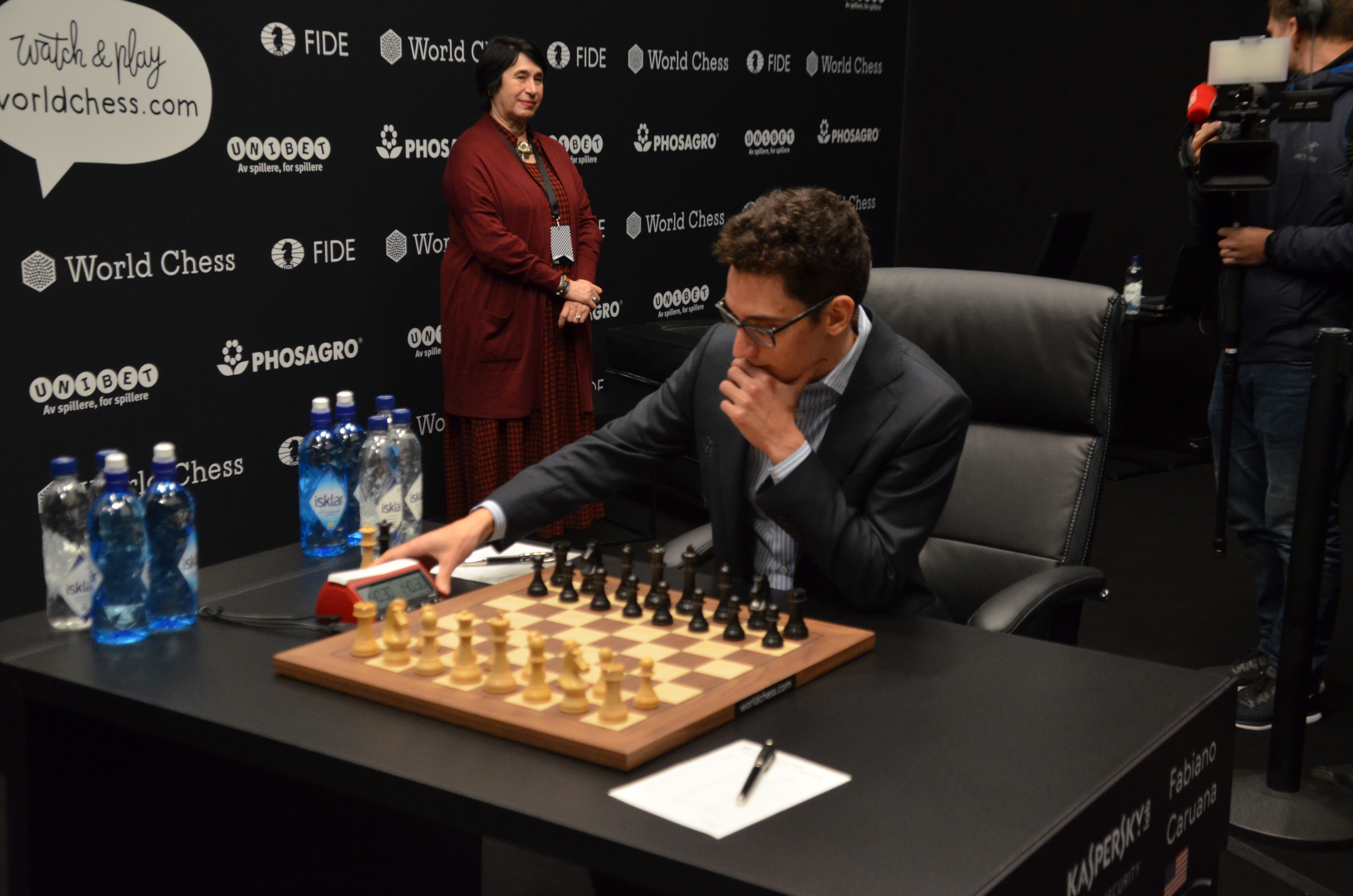
Caruana at the World Chess Championship 2018

In January, Caruana finished 11th with a score of 5/13 at the Tata Steel Masters. In March, he won the Candidates Tournament 2018 with a score of 9/14, thus winning the right to challenge Magnus Carlsen in the World Chess Championship 2018 in London in November 2018.

From 31 March to 9 April, Caruana competed in the 5th Grenke Chess Classic. He won the event with a score of 6½/9 (+4–0=5), a point ahead of runner-up Carlsen. With this result he moved to No. 2 in the live world rankings. From 17 to 30 April, he competed in 2018 U.S. Chess Championship, placing second with 8/11 (+6–1=4), half a point behind champion Sam Shankland.

In June, he won the 6th edition of Norway Chess, finishing clear first with a score of 5/8 (+3–1=4), despite having lost to Carlsen in the first round. In August, he jointly won the 6th Sinquefield Cup with Carlsen and Aronian. He also defeated So in a playoff for a place at the London Chess Classic being held in December.

Caruana faced Carlsen in the World Chess Championship 2018 from November 9 to 28. All 12 classical time control games were drawn. Carlsen then won the rapid tiebreak games 3–0. During game four of the 2018 World Chess Championships, a video containing Caruana's preparation files was released onto the Saint Louis Chess Club YouTube channel. In an interview much later, Caruana admitted that he had been only made aware of this, by his second Cristian Chirilă, before the Round 4 press conference.

=== 2019 ===
From May to November, Caruana competed in the Grand Chess Tour as one of 12 regular participants. He finished in joint-10th place after the first 7 events, thus failing to qualify for the finals at the London Chess Classic.

=== 2020 ===
In January, he won the Category 20 Tata Steel Masters with a round to spare, scoring 10/13 (+7–0=6), two points ahead of second-placed Magnus Carlsen. As a result, he reached a rating of 2842 on the February FIDE rating list, his highest since October 2014. As the runner-up of the 2018 World Championship, Caruana automatically qualified for the 2020 Candidates Tournament, which began 17 March 2020. The tournament was suspended halfway through due to the COVID-19 pandemic. At the time of the postponement, Caruana was tied for third place out of eight players with a score of 3.5 out of 7. The Candidates resumed on April 19, 2021, and ended on April 28, 2021. Caruana ended with 7½/14 points (3 wins, 9 draws, and 2 losses). Caruana tied for third place but due to tie-breaks placed fourth out of eight.

=== 2021 ===
Caruana played in the continuation of Candidates Tournament 2020–2021 from April 19 to April 28 and finished in fourth place on tiebreaks with a score of 7.5/10 (+3-2=9) (Note: 3 wins, 2 losses, 9 draws. This includes: 3 wins against GM Kirill Alekseenko in round 2, GM Maxime Vachier-Lagrave in round 8, and GM Wang Hao in round 13; 2 losses against GM Ding Liren in round 3 and GM Anish Giri in round 12.) His win against MVL in round 8 was considered an impressive show of preparation and play, where he sacrificed 3 pawns and a piece (a novelty) in the Poisoned Pawn variation of the Najdorf Sicilian.

Following the Candidates, from July 12 to July 20, Caruana played in the Chess World Cup, but was eliminated in the third round by Rinat Jumabayev.

From August 9 to August 16, Caruana played in the 2021 St Louis Rapid and Blitz taking second behind Hikaru Nakamura. Following that, from August 16 to August 28, he played in the Sinquefield Cup tying for second behind winner MVL with 5.5/9 points (+3-1=5) (Note: 3 wins, 1 loss, 5 draws. This includes: 3 wins against GM Sam Shankland (2709), GM Shakhriyar Mamedyarov (2782), and GM Dariusz Swiercz (2655); 1 loss against GM Jeffrey Xiong (2710); 5 draws against GM Maxime Vachier-Lagrave (2751), GM Lenier Dominguez (2758), GM Wesley So (2772), GM Richard Rapport (2763) and GM Peter Svidler (2714). The numbers in brackets represent the opponent's elo rating.) and a tournament performance rating of 2824, which earned him $45,000 and 8.3 GCT points. In the Grand Chess Tour, he placed fourth overall behind MVL, Wesley So and Mamedyarov.

From October 5 to October 19, Caruana then participated in the 2021 US Chess Championship held at the Saint Louis Chess Club in Missouri, where he scored 2nd place with a score of 6.5/11 after losing to GM Wesley So in the rapid tiebreaks.

In November, Caruana was runner-up in the FIDE Grand Swiss Tournament 2021 with a score of 7.5/11 (+4-0=7) (Note: 4 wins, 0 losses, 7 draws. This includes: 4 wins against GM Maksim Chigaev (2639), GM David Howell (2658), GM Nils Grandelius (2662) and the winner of the tournament GM Alireza Firouzja (2770); 7 draws against GM Nihal Sarin (2652), GM Ivan Šarić (2644), GM Dariusz Swiercz (2647), GM Evgeniy Najer (2654), GM Samuel Sevian (2654), GM Maxime Vachier-Lagrave (2763), and GM Alexandr Predke (2666). The numbers in brackets represent the opponent's elo rating.) and a tournament performance rating of 2807, behind Alireza Firouzja, which qualified him for the Candidates Tournament 2022.

Between December 18 and December 23, Caruana also participated in the 2021 Vugar Gashimov Memorial, where he edged out Richard Rapport in an armaggedon playoff to win first place.

Three days later, from December 26 to December 28, 2021, Caruana participated in the 2021 FIDE World Rapid Championship, where he ended up as one of the joint leaders with 9.5/13 points, but ultimately finished 4th place as he could not advance to the playoffs due to controversial tiebreak rules. Subsequently, on the 28th and 29th, he played the FIDE World Blitz Championship, ranking 39th.

In 2021, Caruana split with his long time coach/second, Rustam Kasimdzhanov, with Kasimdzhanov citing that the pandemic affected their relationship and opportunities to work together.

Apart from the events he played, Caruana also participated in the coverage of the World Chess Championship 2021 in November and December 2021, along with Daniel Rensch and Robert Hess, for Chess.com.

=== 2022 ===
From the 14th to the 30th of January, Caruana participated in the Tata Steel Chess Tournament, placing 8th with a score of 6.5/13.

From February 12 to August 21, Caruana competed in the Chess.com RCC (Note: Rapid Chess Championship) and placed 3rd with 64 points, behind runner-up Dmitry Andreikin (73 points) and tournament winner Hikaru Nakamura (102 points).

In April 2022, he won the inaugural American Cup, a double-elimination tournament in Missouri, ahead of Levon Aronian, Wesley So, and Lenier Dominguez.

From June 16 to July 5, Caruana participated in the Candidates Tournament held in Madrid, having qualified to play by being the runner-up in the Grand Swiss in 2021 behind Alireza Firouzja. Caruana finished 5th with a score of 6.5/14 (+3-4=7) (Note: 3 wins, 4 losses, 7 draws. This includes: 3 wins against GM Hikaru Nakamura in round 1, GM Alireza Firouzja in round 6, and GM Teimour Radjabov in round 7; 4 losses against Nakamura in round 8, GM Jan-Krzysztof Duda in round 10, GM Ding Liren in round 11, and Firouzja in round 14.) despite being 2nd behind tournament leader Ian Nepomniachtchi after the end of the first half of the tournament.

From July 28 to August 9, Caruana played board 1 for the US at the 44th Chess Olympiad in Chennai where his team finished 5th despite being seeded 1st. He finished the event with a score of 5/10 (+3-3=4) (Note: 3 wins, 3 losses, 4 draws. This includes: 3 wins against GM Parham Maghsoodloo (2701), GM Dimitrios Mastrovasilis (2599), and GM Mustafa Yilmaz (2634); 3 losses against GM Nodirbek Abdusattorov (2688), GM Gabriel Sargissian (2698), and GM Gukesh D (2684); 4 draws against GM Axel Bachmann (2588), GM Baadur Jobava (2585), GM Avital Boruchovsky (2551), and GM Pentala Harikrishna (2720). The numbers in brackets represent the opponent's elo rating.) and a tournament performance rating of 2645.

From August 26 to August 30, Caruana participated in the Saint Louis Rapid & Blitz tournament, as part of the Grand Chess Tour and finished in third place, after Alireza Firouzja and Hikaru Nakamura. The next month, Caruana participated in the Sinquefield Cup, finishing tied 3rd alongside compatriot Wesley So with 4.5/8 points (Note: 2 wins against Maxime Vachier-Lagrave and Hans Niemann; 1 loss against Wesley So; 5 draws against Alireza Firouzja, Ian Nepomniachtchi, Leinier Domínguez Pérez, Levon Aronian and Shakhriyar Mamedyarov.) and behind runner-up Ian Nepomniachtchi and winner Alireza Firouzja. His two consecutive third-place finishes earned him enough points to finish in fourth place in the Grand Chess Tour – just 1 point short of 3rd place. Caruana followed this up with a victory in the Champions Showdown: Chess 9LX, a rapid chess 960 tournament held in Saint Louis, after defeating Alireza Firouzja in the playoffs for the title. His first-place finish earned him $31,250.

From October 5 to October 19, Caruana participated in the 2022 US Chess Championship, winning ahead of Wesley So, Levon Aronian, and Lenier Dominguez, among others.

Caruana finished third in World Rapid Chess Championship 2022 by defeating Vladislav Artemiev, Vladimir Fedoseev and drawing against Magnus Carlsen, he finished with score of (9.5/13).

=== 2023 ===
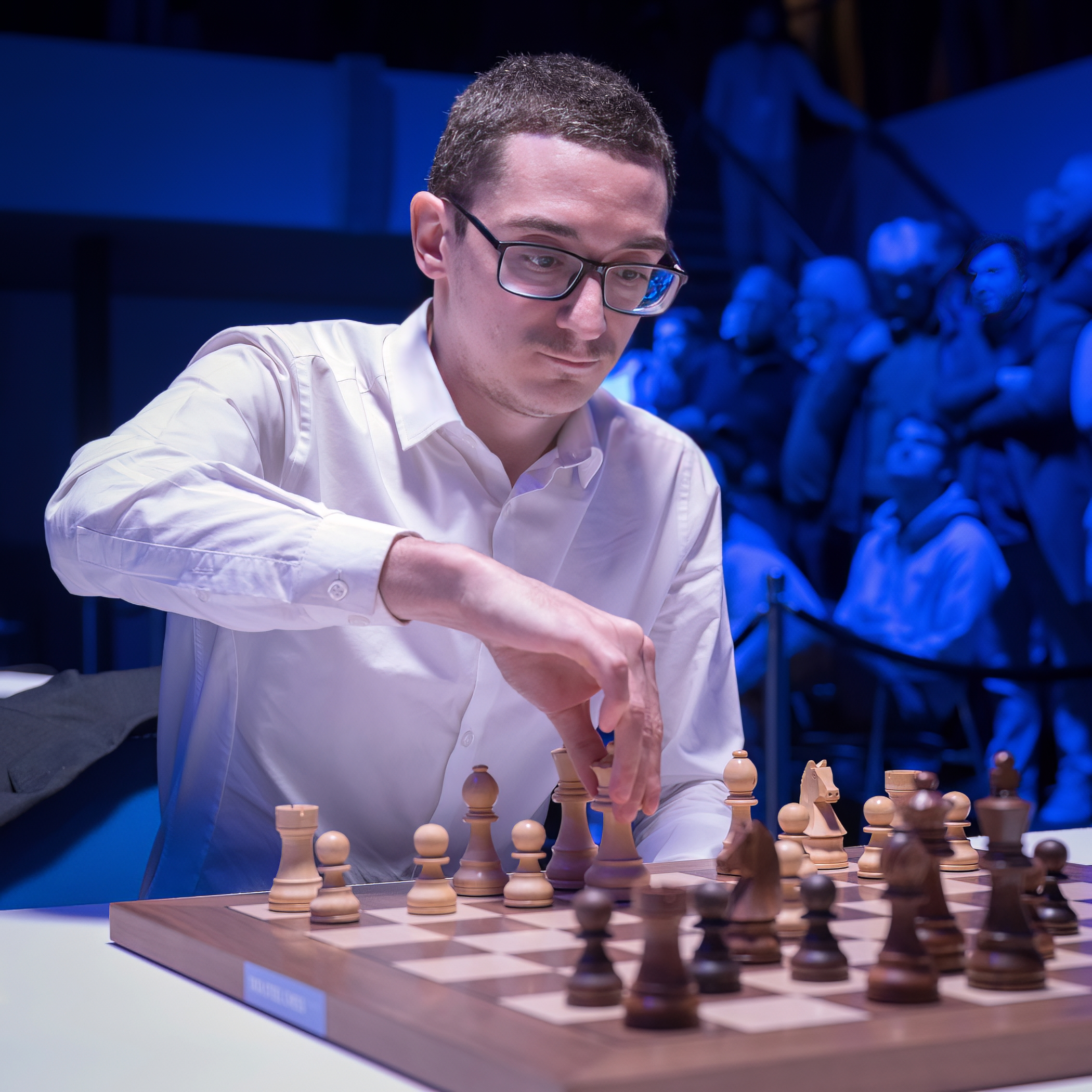
Caruana at the Tata Steel Chess Tournament 2023

From May 6 to May 15, Caruana participated in the Superbet Chess Classic held in Bucharest. He would win games against Maxime Vachier-Lagrave and Ian Nepomniachtchi and would go undefeated allowing him to claim 1st place with a score of 5.5/9.

In the Chess World Cup 2023, Caruana defeated reigning champion Jan-Krzysztof Duda, among others, to reach the semifinals. This result has earned him qualification to the Candidates Tournament 2024.

In the 2023 US Chess Championship, Caruana clinched victory with a round to spare to defend his title as US champion. He would earn wins against Hans Niemann and Abhimanyu Mishra, among others, en route to his victory.

From November 14 to November 18, Caruana competed in the Saint Louis Rapid & Blitz. He would edge out second-place finisher Maxime Vachier-Lagrave by half a point to win the event. Caruana earned 13 Grand Chess Tour 2023 points and $40,000 from his victory.

Caruana won the 2023 Sinquefield Cup, scoring 5.5 points out of 8. He scored wins against Alireza Firouzja, Wesley So, and Richárd Rapport en route to his victory, where he earned $100,000 and 13 Grand Chess tour points.

Caruana won the 2023 Grand Chess Tour with a score of 46 points of a possible 52, which is the highest point total in the Tour's history since switching to a 4-tournament event. Caruana scored 1st place in the Superbet Chess Romania, 4th in the SuperUnited Rapid & Blitz Croatia, 1st in the Saint Louis Rapid & Blitz, and 1st in the Sinquefield Cup. Caruana earned $175,000 for his victory in the Grand Chess Tour.

=== 2024 ===
Caruana successfully defended his title at the 2024 Superbet Chess Classic held in Bucharest, Romania. Victories over Alireza Firouzja and Bogdan-Daniel Deac in early rounds had Caruana poised to win the event, until Anish Giri defeated him in the final round. In rapid tie-breaks, Caruana scored 3/3 against Alireza, R Praggnanandhaa, and Gukesh D to ultimately win the tournament. Caruana claims 9.25 Grand Chess Tour points and $68,750 for his first-place finish. Just a few days later Caruana won the 2024 SuperUnited Rapid & Blitz in Zagreb, Croatia with five rounds to spare. Caruana went undefeated in the rapid portion, with a score of 15/18, and an aggregate 27/38 to tie Magnus Carlsen for the most points in a Grand Chess Tour Rapid & Blitz event. With this tournament victory, Caruana claimed 13 Grand Chess Tour points, which moved him to 1st place in the tour standings.

Caruana placed second at the 2024 Sinquefield Cup - the final Grand Chess Tour event of the year. Following a first-round defeat to eventual champion Alireza Firouzja, Caruana went on to defeat Nodirbek Abdusattorov, Ian Nepomniachtchi, and Anish Giri. With 36.75 Grand Chess Tour points, Caruana placed second in the tour standings, again falling short of Firouzja. Caruana earns $234,250 and automatic qualification to the 2025 Tour from his second-place finish.

Caruana won the 2024 US Chess Championship, giving him his 3rd consecutive US champion title, and 4th title overall (2016, 2022, 2023, 2024). Caruana finished with a score of 7/10, securing victories over Ray Robson, Grigoriy Oparin, Abhimanyu Mishra, and Sam Shankland. Although Caruana also defeated Christopher Yoo, Yoo was subsequently disqualified from the tournament and banned from the Saint Louis Chess Club for striking a staff member in frustration after losing to Caruana. Caruana's victory, and all other of Yoo's matches, were annulled as a result of the disqualification. With Carissa Yip winning the 2024 U.S. Women's Chess Championship, both open and women's champion defended their 2023 title. Caruana also won the 2024 U.S. Masters Chess Championship with a 8/9 score, and a $7500 prize. The first place finish granted Caruana 17.11 points for the 2024 FIDE Circuit. Just days later, Caruana shared first place in the St. Louis Masters. Caruana earned 16.39 circuit points from the event, which brought him to first place in the circuit. He would keep this lead for the rest of the year and qualify for the 2026 Candidates Tournament.

=== 2025 ===
Caruana finished 8th with 6 points in the Tata Steel Chess Tournament. On February 13, 2025, he signed with the esports organization Team Liquid, opening their chess division. Caruana represented the organization during the Champions Chess Tour 2025 and the 2025 Esports World Cup.

In March, Caruana won the Champions Showdown: The Kings in St. Louis.

In June, Caruana finished second in the Norway Chess 2025.

Caruana claimed the second Grand Chess Tour title of his career by defeating Levon Aronian in the Semifinals and Maxime Vachier-Lagrave in the finals. He earned $150,000 and automatic qualification to the 2026 Grand Chess Tour.

In October, Caruana claimed his 5th US championship, and 4th consecutive title, which ties Bobby Fischer for the most consecutive US championships in history. Caruana scored 8/11, narrowly edging out 2nd-place-finisher Wesley So who scored 7½.

=== 2026 ===
In February, Caruana finished runner-up to Magnus Carlsen in the FIDE Freestyle Chess World Championship 2026.

In March-April, Caruana participated in the Candidates Tournament, finishing 3rd with a score of 7.5/14 (+4−3=7).

In July, Caruana participated in the Naroditsky Memorial 2026, placing 16th in the rapid section and 24th in the blitz section.

Caruana qualified for the Grand Chess Tour 2026 finals by placing 3rd in the tour rankings, He finished 2nd in Rapid & Blitz Poland, 2nd in Chess Classic Romania (+2-0=7) , tied 5-7th in Saint Louis Rapid & Blitz and tied 5-8th in the Sinquefield Cup (+2-2=5). He defeated Wesley So in the semifinals with the scoreline (18–12) and subsequently lost to R Praggnanandhaa in the finals (13–15). By finishing as the runner-up, he also qualified for the Grand Chess Tour 2027.

In November, Caruana finished 3rd in the Total Chess World Championship 2026 pilot event. He finished 8th in the Blitz Swiss with score 5½/9 (+4–2=3), which served as the tiebreaker for the group stage. Caruana won Group B with 17 points (+4–1=5) and qualified to the top knockout bracket, he scored 4 wins of his first 5 games and was just two wins away from ending Carlsen's 15 year streak of being world no.1 in classical ratings. He lost to Alireza Firouzja in their semifinal match with the match going to armageddon and defeated Maxime Vachier-Lagrave in the 3rd place match.

== Playing style ==
As a youth, Caruana had an aggressive style of play. He later said:

I preferred to attack all the time and really loved sacrificing pieces to get at the enemy king. I played like that for quite a long time, but when I moved up it turned out that you can far from always win with a direct attack; ... I had to become universal, to learn to manoeuvre and defend and so on.

Caruana's playing style is now universal, based on opening preparation and calculation:

I wouldn't assess it in such categories [tactical or strategic]. It seems to me I'm a good fighter. I enjoy playing different types of position, both tactical and strategic. I can't say there's anything I avoid. I can attack on a board full of pieces or manoeuvre in a roughly even position, and I've got nothing against the endgame.

Caruana has been hailed by Magnus Carlsen as a player who has an edge in calculations and opening preparation over most of his contemporaries (bar Carlsen himself). Carlsen has also described him as "undogmatic", but someone who may not play as well in simpler positions. This sentiment has been echoed largely in the chess world, with Caruana having earned himself a nickname of "The Machine".

Caruana is known as a hardworking player, having once said: "Hundreds of games are played each day all around the world, and a lot of them are important. They're all available online, but you have to put in the time to look at them all. And you need to analyze, find new trends, keep trying to find new ideas to use against specific opponents."

== Federations and national championships ==
=== National Chess Federation membership ===
- Caruana is a "Benefactor" Life Member of the United States Chess Federation (USCF), and has been a member of the federation since the age of 5 in 1998.

=== National Chess Federation ranking ===
- United States Chess Federation: first-highest ranked player

=== National Championships ===
- Italy – Caruana won the Italian National Championship in 2007, 2008, 2010, and 2011. He did not play the championship in 2009 and 2012–2014.
- United States – Caruana won the U.S. Chess Championship in 2016 (his first participation), 2022, 2023, 2024 and 2025.

=== World Chess Federation (FIDE) affiliation ===
Caruana possesses dual citizenship of Italy and the United States, so he has the option of FIDE affiliation with either the Italian Chess Federation or the United States Chess Federation.

Caruana played for Italy from 2005 to 2015. On May 12, 2015, the USCF announced that he would be changing federations, to play for the United States.

== Bibliography ==
- Caruana's Ruy Lopez: A White Repertoire for Club Players ISBN 978-90-5691-944-3
- Fabiano Caruana: Navigating the Ruy Lopez – A world-class player explains (DVD) Vol. 1-3 ISBN 978-3-86681-735-7
- Fabiano Caruana: 60 Memorable Games – Andrew E. Soltis ISBN 978-1-84994-721-3
- Caruana: Move by Move – Cyrus Lakdawala ISBN 978-1-78194-479-0

== Notes ==
Achievements
Preceded by Hikaru Nakamura	Youngest ever United States Grandmaster; 2007–2009	Succeeded by Ray Robson
Preceded by Michele Godena	Italian Chess Champion; 2007–2008	Succeeded by Lexy Ortega
Preceded by Lexy Ortega	Italian Chess Champion; 2010–2011	Succeeded by Alberto David
Preceded by Magnus Carlsen	Sinquefield Cup Champion; 2014	Succeeded by Levon Aronian
Preceded by Maxime Vachier-Lagrave	Sinquefield Cup Champion (with Levon Aronian and Magnus Carlsen); 2018	Succeeded by Ding Liren
Preceded by Vladimir Kramnik	Dortmund Sparkassen Champion; 2012	Succeeded by Michael Adams
Preceded by Michael Adams	Dortmund Sparkassen Champion; 2014–2015	Succeeded by Maxime Vachier-Lagrave
Preceded by Hikaru Nakamura	United States Chess Champion; 2016	Succeeded by Wesley So
Preceded by Wesley So	United States Chess Champion; 2022–Present	Succeeded by Incumbent
Preceded by Created	FIDE Circuit Champion; 2023–2024	Succeeded by R Praggnanandhaa
