= Tata Steel Chess Tournament 2018 =

Chess tournament 2018

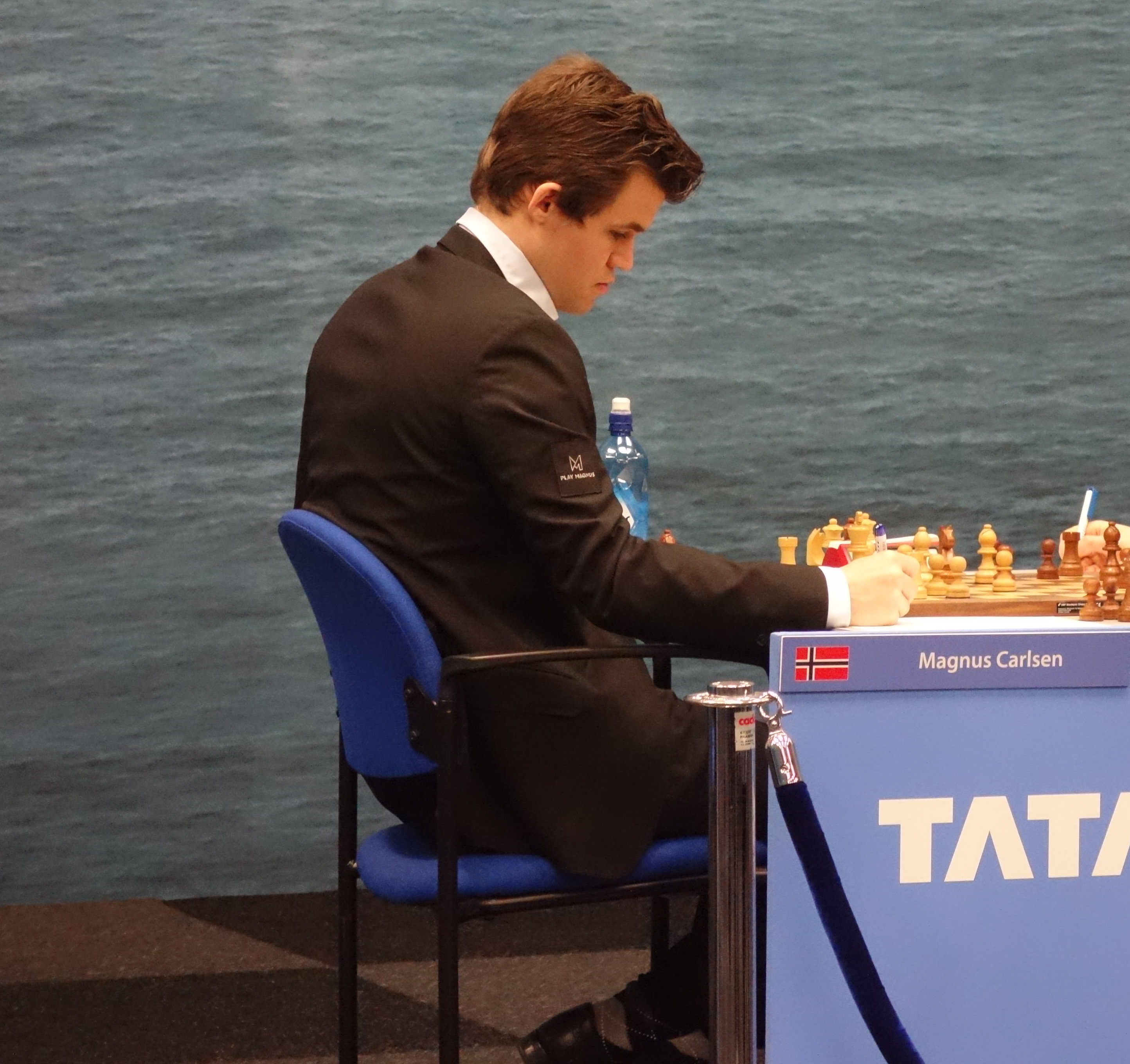
- Carlsen in 2018
- Location: Wijk aan Zee, Netherlands
- Dates: 13–28 January 2018
- Competitors: 28
- Winning score: 9 points of 13

Champion
- (Norway) Magnus Carlsen (Masters) (India) Vidit Gujrathi (Challengers)

The Tata Steel Chess Tournament 2018 was the 80th edition of the Tata Steel Chess Tournament. It was held in Wijk aan Zee (with away days in Hilversum and Groningen) from 13 to 28 January 2018. The tournament was won by Magnus Carlsen.

Carlsen's won the event for a record sixth time, ahead of Viswanathan Anand, who has won five times. It was also the first Tata Steel event to be decided by tiebreak. Both Carlsen and Anish Giri finished on 9/13, but Carlsen won the tiebreak after winning the first blitz game, and drawing the second. Carlsen had not lost a tiebreak since 2007.

80th Tata Steel Masters, 13–28 January 2018, Wijk aan Zee — Groningen — Hilversum, Netherlands, Category XX (2750)
| | Player | Rating | 1 | 2 | 3 | 4 | 5 | 6 | 7 | 8 | 9 | 10 | 11 | 12 | 13 | 14 | Total | TB | SB | TPR |
|---|---|---|---|---|---|---|---|---|---|---|---|---|---|---|---|---|---|---|---|---|
| 1 | Magnus Carlsen (Norway) | 2834 | | ½ | ½ | ½ | ½ | 1 | ½ | ½ | ½ | 1 | ½ | 1 | 1 | 1 | 9 | 1½ | | 2885 |
| 2 | Anish Giri (Netherlands) | 2752 | ½ | | 1 | 1 | ½ | ½ | ½ | ½ | ½ | ½ | ½ | 1 | 1 | 1 | 9 | ½ | | 2891 |
| 3 | Vladimir Kramnik (Russia) | 2787 | ½ | 0 | | ½ | 1 | ½ | 0 | 1 | 1 | ½ | 1 | 1 | 1 | ½ | 8½ | | 49.50 | 2857 |
| 4 | Shakhriyar Mamedyarov (Azerbaijan) | 2804 | ½ | 0 | ½ | | ½ | ½ | ½ | 1 | 1 | ½ | 1 | ½ | 1 | 1 | 8½ | | 48.00 | 2856 |
| 5 | Viswanathan Anand (India) | 2767 | ½ | ½ | 0 | ½ | | ½ | ½ | ½ | ½ | 1 | 1 | 1 | ½ | 1 | 8 | | 46.00 | 2836 |
| 6 | Wesley So (United States) | 2792 | 0 | ½ | ½ | ½ | ½ | | ½ | ½ | 1 | 1 | ½ | ½ | 1 | 1 | 8 | | 45.25 | 2834 |
| 7 | Sergey Karjakin (Russia) | 2753 | ½ | ½ | 1 | ½ | ½ | ½ | | ½ | ½ | ½ | 1 | ½ | ½ | ½ | 7½ | | | 2807 |
| 8 | Peter Svidler (Russia) | 2768 | ½ | ½ | 0 | 0 | ½ | ½ | ½ | | ½ | ½ | ½ | ½ | ½ | 1 | 6 | | | 2720 |
| 9 | Wei Yi (China) | 2743 | ½ | ½ | 0 | 0 | ½ | 0 | ½ | ½ | | 1 | ½ | ½ | ½ | ½ | 5½ | | | 2694 |
| 10 | Gawain Jones (England) | 2640 | 0 | ½ | ½ | ½ | 0 | 0 | ½ | ½ | 0 | | ½ | ½ | 1 | ½ | 5 | | 29.50 | 2672 |
| 11 | Fabiano Caruana (United States) | 2811 | ½ | ½ | 0 | 0 | 0 | ½ | 0 | ½ | ½ | ½ | | ½ | ½ | 1 | 5 | | 28.00 | 2659 |
| 12 | Maxim Matlakov (Russia) | 2718 | 0 | 0 | 0 | ½ | 0 | ½ | ½ | ½ | ½ | ½ | ½ | | ½ | 1 | 5 | | 27.00 | 2666 |
| 13 | Adhiban Baskaran (India) | 2655 | 0 | 0 | 0 | 0 | ½ | 0 | ½ | ½ | ½ | 0 | ½ | ½ | | ½ | 3½ | | | 2583 |
| 14 | Hou Yifan (China) | 2680 | 0 | 0 | ½ | 0 | 0 | 0 | ½ | 0 | ½ | ½ | 0 | 0 | ½ | | 2½ | | | 2505 |

- Final blitz tie-break: Magnus Carlsen def. Anish Giri, 1½–½.

2018 Tata Steel Challengers, 13–28 January 2018, Wijk aan Zee, Netherlands, Category XV (2612)
| | Player | Rating | 1 | 2 | 3 | 4 | 5 | 6 | 7 | 8 | 9 | 10 | 11 | 12 | 13 | 14 | Total | SB | Black | TPR |
|---|---|---|---|---|---|---|---|---|---|---|---|---|---|---|---|---|---|---|---|---|
| 1 | GM Vidit Santosh Gujrathi (India) | 2718 | | ½ | ½ | 1 | ½ | 1 | ½ | ½ | ½ | ½ | ½ | 1 | 1 | 1 | 9 | | | 2745 |
| 2 | GM Anton Korobov (Ukraine) | 2652 | ½ | | ½ | 0 | 1 | 0 | 1 | ½ | 1 | 1 | ½ | ½ | ½ | 1 | 8 | | | 2696 |
| 3 | GM Jeffery Xiong (United States) | 2634 | ½ | ½ | | ½ | ½ | ½ | 1 | 1 | ½ | 0 | 1 | ½ | ½ | ½ | 7½ | 47.75 | | 2667 |
| 4 | GM Bassem Amin (Egypt) | 2693 | 0 | 1 | ½ | | ½ | 1 | ½ | ½ | ½ | ½ | 0 | 1 | ½ | 1 | 7½ | 46.75 | | 2663 |
| 5 | GM Jorden van Foreest (Netherlands) | 2629 | ½ | 0 | ½ | ½ | | ½ | 0 | ½ | ½ | 1 | 1 | 1 | 1 | ½ | 7½ | 45.50 | | 2668 |
| 6 | GM Dmitry Gordievsky (Russia) | 2622 | 0 | 1 | ½ | 0 | ½ | | ½ | ½ | 1 | ½ | 1 | ½ | ½ | 1 | 7½ | 45.00 | | 2668 |
| 7 | GM Matthias Blübaum (Germany) | 2640 | ½ | 0 | 0 | ½ | 1 | ½ | | ½ | ½ | ½ | 1 | ½ | 1 | 0 | 6½ | | | 2610 |
| 8 | GM Erwin l'Ami (Netherlands) | 2634 | ½ | ½ | 0 | ½ | ½ | ½ | ½ | | ½ | ½ | ½ | ½ | ½ | ½ | 6 | 38.75 | | 2581 |
| 9 | GM Benjamin Bok (Netherlands) | 2607 | ½ | 0 | ½ | ½ | ½ | 0 | ½ | ½ | | ½ | 1 | ½ | ½ | ½ | 6 | 37.50 | 7 | 2583 |
| 10 | GM Aryan Tari (Norway) | 2599 | ½ | 0 | 1 | ½ | 0 | ½ | ½ | ½ | ½ | | 0 | ½ | ½ | 1 | 6 | 37.50 | 6 | 2584 |
| 11 | IM Lucas van Foreest (Netherlands) | 2481 | ½ | ½ | 0 | 1 | 0 | 0 | 0 | ½ | 0 | 1 | | ½ | ½ | 1 | 5½ | 33.75 | | 2565 |
| 12 | GM Michał Krasenkow (Poland) | 2671 | 0 | ½ | ½ | 0 | 0 | ½ | ½ | ½ | ½ | ½ | ½ | | ½ | 1 | 5½ | 32.50 | | 2550 |
| 13 | GM Harika Dronavalli (India) | 2497 | 0 | ½ | ½ | ½ | 0 | ½ | 0 | ½ | ½ | ½ | ½ | ½ | | ½ | 5 | | | 2534 |
| 14 | WGM Olga Girya (Russia) | 2489 | 0 | 0 | ½ | 0 | ½ | 0 | 1 | ½ | ½ | 0 | 0 | 0 | ½ | | 3½ | | | 2446 |
