= 2016 US Chess Championship =

2016 Chess tournament

United States Championship 2016
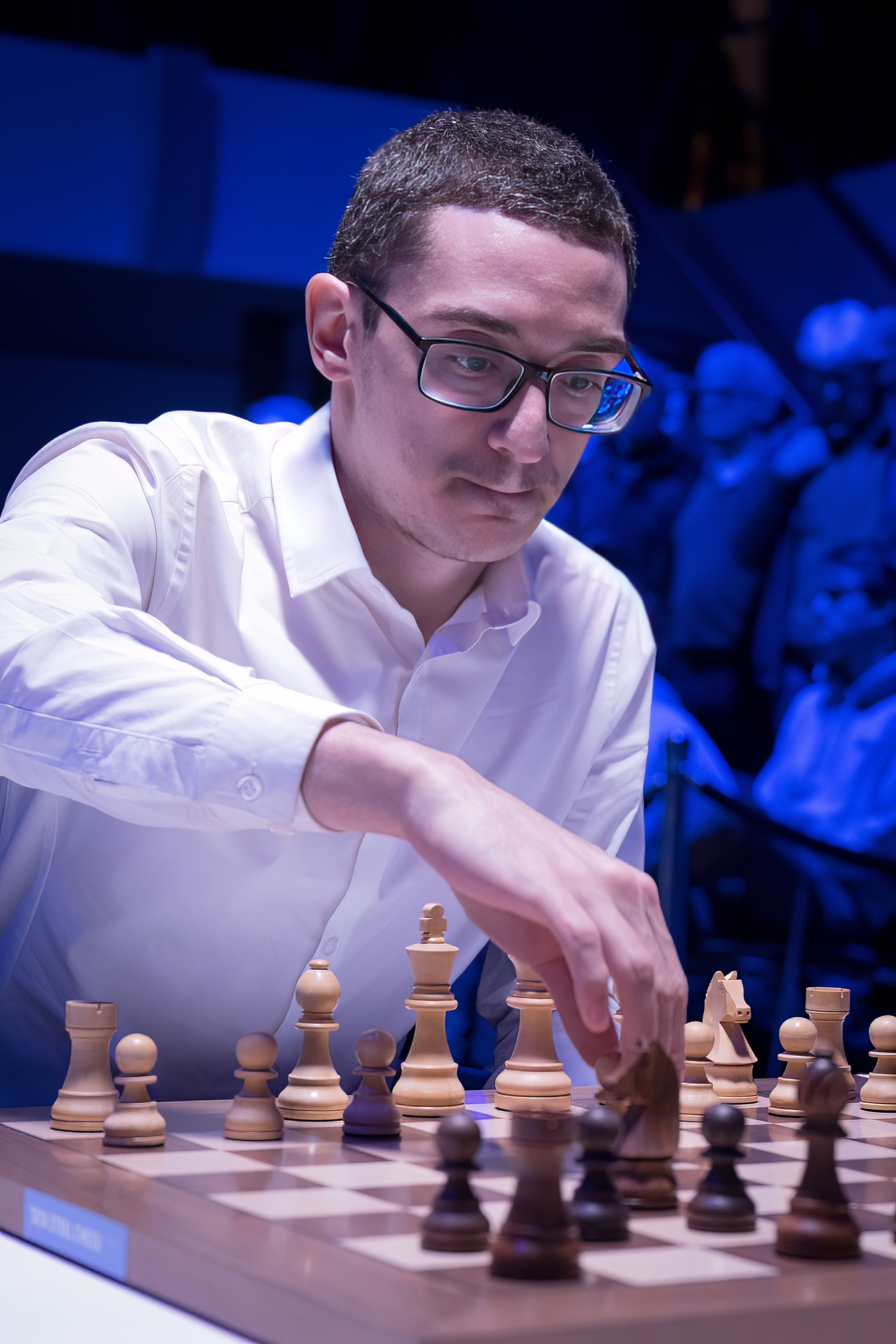
- Fabiano Caruana, the winner of the tournament, earned his first title as the United States Chess Champion
- Venue: Saint Louis Chess Club
- Location: St. Louis, Missouri
- Dates: April 13 - April 30, 2016
- Competitors: 12
- Winning score: 8.5 points of 11
- Total prize money: $194,000

Champion
- (United States) Fabiano Caruana

The 2016 US Chess Championship was played between April 13 and 30, 2016 at the Chess Club and Scholastic Center of Saint Louis in Saint Louis, Missouri. The main tournament consisted of the top-3 US players in terms of FIDE ranking, Wesley So, Hikaru Nakamura, and Fabiano Caruana. The other tournament participants included Gata Kamsky, Varuzhan Akobian, Alexander Shabalov, Alexander Onischuk, Aleksandr Lenderman, Samuel Shankland, Ray Robson, and juniors Akshat Chandra and Jeffery Xiong.

== Results ==
Fabiano Caruana won the championship with 8.5 points out of a maximum 11 (+6-0=5).

Pl.	Player	Rating	1	2	3	4	5	6	7	8	9	10	11	12	Points	TPR
1	Fabiano Caruana (USA)	2795	—	½	1	½	1	½	½	1	1	1	½	1	8.5	+59
2	Wesley So (USA)	2773	½	—	½	½	½	½	1	½	½	1	1	1	7.5	+1
3	Hikaru Nakamura (USA)	2787	0	½	—	½	½	1	½	1	1	1	1	½	7.5	-16
4	Ray Robson (USA)	2663	½	½	½	—	1	½	½	½	½	½	1	1	7.0	+86
5	Alexander Onischuk (USA)	2664	0	½	½	0	—	½	½	1	1	½	½	1	6.0	+20
6	Jeffery Xiong (USA)	2618	½	½	0	½	½	—	1	½	½	½	½	½	5.5	+71
7	Gata Kamsky (USA)	2678	½	0	½	½	½	0	—	½	½	½	½	1	5.0	-46
8	Sam Shankland (USA)	2656	0	½	0	½	0	½	½	—	½	1	0	1	4.5	-57
9	Aleksandr Lenderman (USA)	2618	0	½	0	½	0	½	½	½	—	½	½	1	4.5	-30
10	Varuzhan Akobian (USA)	2615	0	0	0	½	½	½	½	0	½	—	1	1	4.5	-16
11	Alexander Shabalov (USA)	2528	½	0	0	0	½	½	½	1	½	0	—	½	4.0	+48
12	Akshat Chandra (USA)	2477	0	0	½	0	0	½	0	0	0	0	½	—	1.5	-154

== Ultimate Blitz Challenge ==
In addition to the main tournament, the 2016 U.S. Chess Championship also hosted the "Ultimate Blitz Challenge", a special exhibition blitz tournament. Former world champion Garry Kasparov played against the top three finishers of the 2016 U.S. Chess Championship. The top three finishers turned out to be the top three seeds, Fabiano Caruana, Wesley So, and Hikaru Nakamura. All three were ranked among the top 10 in the world at the time, so this tournament represents the first time Kasparov played against top chess players since his retirement in 2005. The total prize fund for the tournament was $50,000, with individual prize breakdowns of $20,000, $15,000, $10,000, and $5,000 depending on the final score.

=== Results ===
Pl.	Player	Rating	1	2	3	4	Points
1	Hikaru Nakamura (USA)	2883	—	0 1 ½ 1 1 ½	½ 0 1 ½ ½ 0	1 0 1 ½ 1 1	11
2	Wesley So (USA)	2726	1 0 ½ 0 0 ½	—	0 1 1 1 ½ ½	0 ½ 1 1 ½ 1	10
3	Garry Kasparov (RUS)	2812	½ 1 0 ½ ½ 1	1 0 0 0 ½ ½	—	½ ½ 1 1 0 1	9½
4	Fabiano Caruana (USA)	2665	0 1 0 ½ 0 0	1 ½ 0 0 ½ 0	½ ½ 0 0 1 0	—	5½

== See also ==
- U.S. Chess Championship
