= Cyrus Lakdawala =

American chess player (born 1960)

Personal information
- Born: October 10, 1960 (age 65) Mumbai, Maharashtra, India

Chess career
- Country: United States of America
- Title: International Master (2002)
- FIDE rating: 2413 (July 2026)
- Peak rating: 2442 (October 2001)

Cyrus Lakdawala is an American chess International Master (IM) and journalist who has written more than 60 books on chess. Born in Mumbai, Maharashtra, India in 1960, his father taught him chess at the age of 8. He grew up in Montreal, Canada and moved to San Diego, California, where he currently resides, in 1978. In his personal life, he practices both yoga and Buddhist meditation.

== Best Results ==
During his tournament chess career (which he ended due to a bad back) he was co-champion of the 19th National Open in 1987, tied with Maxim Dlugy*, Joel Benjamin, Walter Browne, and Sergey Kudrin (Dlugy was awarded the title on tiebreaks); co-champion of the 34th American Open in 1998, tied with GM Pavel Blatny of the Czech Republic while Lakdawala was still a FIDE Master (FM); US G/60, and US G/30 Championships; he is also the six-time California state champion. and two-time Southern California Open Chess Champion, in 1995 and 2003.

== Writings ==
He has won the Chess Journalists Association's award for Instructional Book of the Year 2020 for In the Zone: Winning Streaks. He won the Chess Journalists Association's award for Best Chess Column in 2016, Cracked Grandmaster Tales / Why Do Grandmasters Blunder?, written on chess.com. His most recent work, From Boy to Challenger: The Toughest Battles of Gukesh D was published in August 2024, four months before the subject became the World Chess Champion.

== Books ==
- The Slav: Move by Move, 2011, Everyman Chess, ISBN 978-1-85744-678-4.
- The Caro-Kann: Move by Move, 2012, Everyman Chess, ISBN 978-1-85744-687-6.
- Larsen: Move by Move, 2014, Everyman Chess, ISBN 978-1-78194-201-7.
- 1...d6: Move by Move, 2011, Everyman Chess, ISBN 978-1-85744-683-8.
- The Colle: Move by Move, 2013, Everyman Chess, ISBN 978-1-85744-996-9.
- Play the London System, 2010, Everyman Chess, ISBN 978-1-85744-639-5.
- From Boy to Man to Challenger: The Fiercest Battles of Gukesh D, 256 pages, 2024, ELK and RUBY, ISBN 978-1-91683-948-9.
- In the Zone: Winning Streaks, 400 pages, 2020, New in Chess, ISBN 978-9-05691-877-4.
