= Lexy Ortega =

Cuban-Italian chess grandmaster (born 1960)

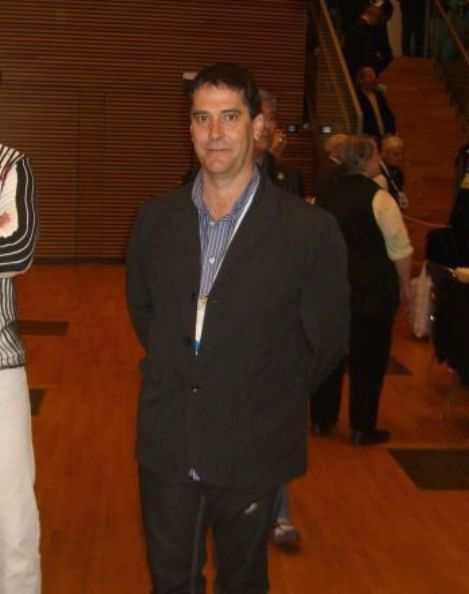
- Lexy Ortega at Dresden 2008 Olympiad

Personal information
- Born: March 8, 1960 (age 66) Camagüey, Cuba

Chess career
- Country: Italy
- Title: Grandmaster (2001)
- Peak rating: 2498 (July 2001)

Lexy Ortega is an Italian chess Grandmaster.

== Career ==
Born in 1960 at Camagüey, Cuba, in 1991 he emigrated to Italy, transferring his nationality and playing for this country ever since.

As a youth he was a judo champion, but a broken foot incident (1974) abruptly ended his martial arts career. Thereafter he turned completely to chess, and very soon he won the 1978 Cuban junior chess championship (Under-18).

In 1986 he was the second of Walter Arencibia when he won the World Junior Chess Championship in Gausdal. He has been for some years the trainer of the Mexican national chess team.

In the year 2000 he was awarded the Grandmaster title from FIDE.

Ortega was the captain of the Italian Women national team at the 38th Chess Olympiad in Dresden, where it ended in 12th place out of 114 teams, its best result ever.

In 2009 he won the Italian Chess Championship, after a play-off with Michele Godena.

He lives in Rome, is married and has two children, Celeste and Riccardo

Other results:

- 1986: equal 3rd-4th at Yerevan, in a field that included Mikhail Tal, Oleg Romanishin, Yuri Balashov and Lev Psakhis
- 1988: 3rd in the Cuban championship (repeated in 1989)
- 1993: =1st with Sinisa Drazič at Rome (INPS Festival)
- 1994: 1st in Naples; 2nd at Imperia after Sergei Tiviakov
- 1996: 1st at Amantea; wins the 28th Italian Team chess championship with "Circolo Scacchistico Averno" of Naples
- 1997: 1st at Verona.
- 1999: 1st at Padua
