= Dimitri Reinderman =

Dutch chess grandmaster (born 1972)

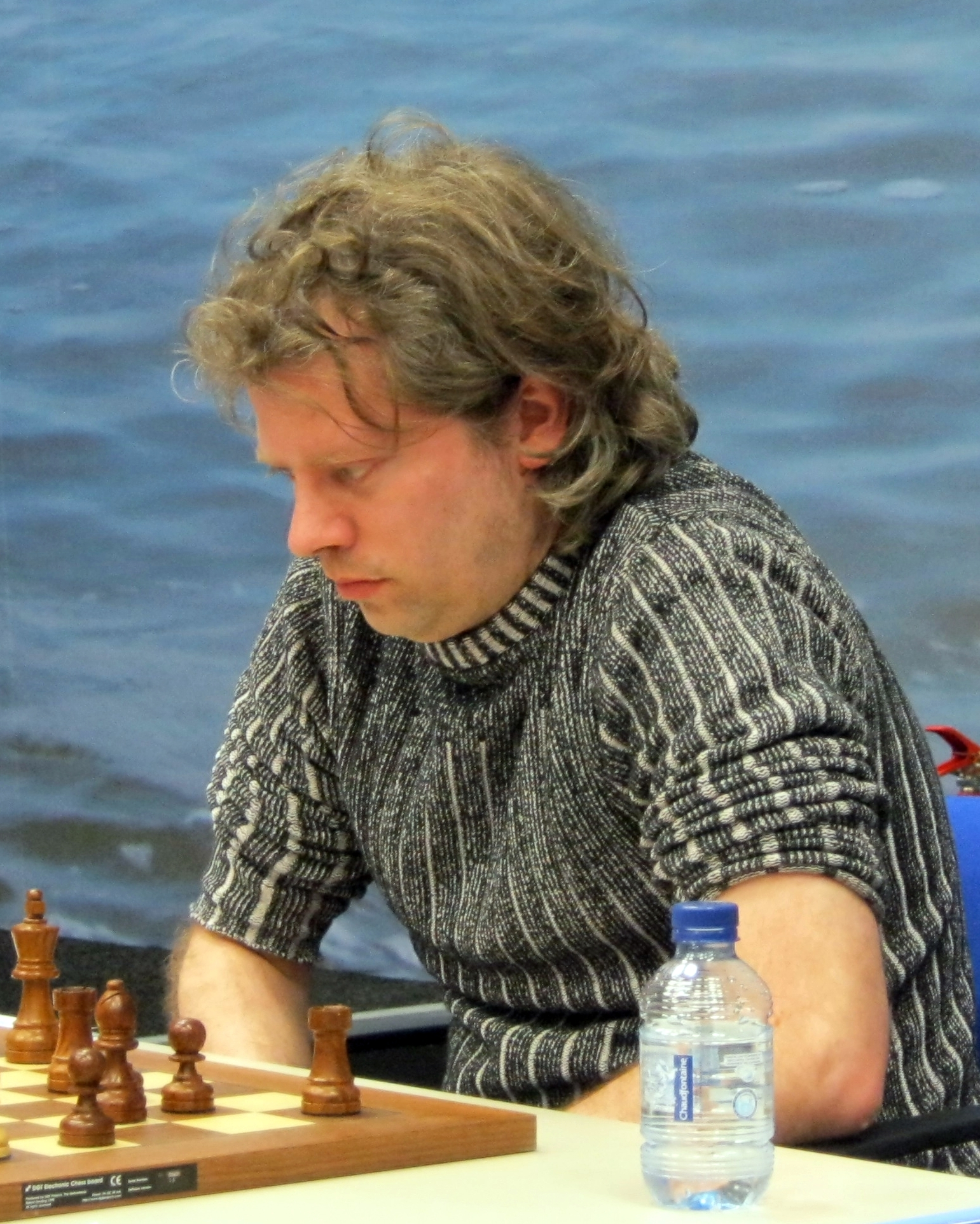
- Reinderman in 2012

Personal information
- Born: 12 August 1972 (age 53) Hoorn, Netherlands

Chess career
- Country: Netherlands
- Title: Grandmaster (1998)
- FIDE rating: 2574 (July 2026)
- Peak rating: 2619 (May 2014)

Dimitri Reinderman (born 12 August 1972) is a Dutch chess grandmaster. He was Dutch Chess Champion in 2013. He is the No. 8 ranked Dutch player as of November 2020.

== Personal life ==
Reinderman is a vegetarian.
