= Wijk aan Zee =

- Village
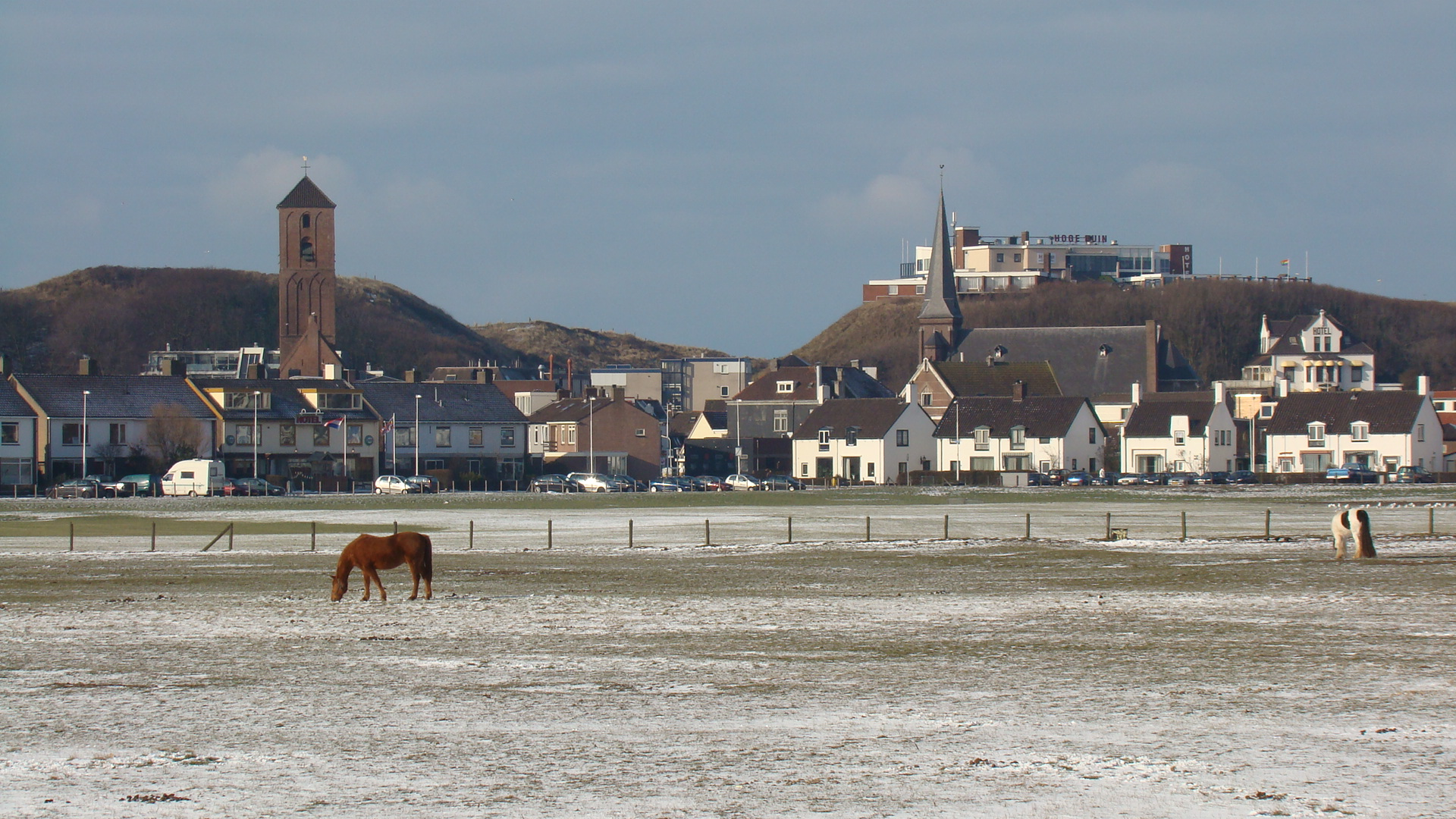

- Flag

- Location in the Netherlands Location in the province of North Holland in the Netherlands
- Coordinates: 52°29′38″N 4°35′37″E
- Country: Netherlands
- Province: North Holland
- Municipality: Beverwijk

Area
  - Total: 4.59 km^{2} (1.77 sq mi)
- Elevation: 9 m (30 ft)

Population (2021)
  - Total: 2,175
  - Density: 474/km^{2} (1,230/sq mi)
- Time zone: UTC+1 (CET)
  - Summer (DST): UTC+2 (CEST)
- Postal code: 1949
- Dialing code: 0251

Wijk aan Zee (Dutch pronunciation: [ˈʋɛik aːn ˈzeː]; lit. 'Neighborhood at Sea') is a village on the coast of the North Sea in the municipality of Beverwijk, the province of North Holland of the Netherlands. The prestigious Tata Steel Chess Tournament (formerly called the Corus chess tournament or the Hoogovens tournament) takes place there every year.

Due to its seaside location, Wijk aan Zee has become a popular destination among tourists. This is reflected in the village economy, which consists of many bars and hotels.

== Cultural Village of Europe 1999 ==
In 1999, Wijk aan Zee named itself "Cultural Village of Europe", recognizing the special nature of village life in general. This was three years after the Danish village of Tommerup had claimed such a title, but this time a large project was to ensue.

Wijk aan Zee came together with villages from England, Estonia, France, Greece, Italy, Spain, Germany, Denmark, the Czech Republic, and Hungary in an effort to determine the role and future of villages in Europe, but also to help each other find ways to cope with difficulties that come to small communities nowadays. Each year, another one of these villages would bear the title of "Cultural Village of Europe".

During the last years, the Cultural Village project led to an increasingly refined picture of what villages have to offer and how to offer it. Simultaneously, this brought about a social critique that is relevant to urban areas as well. It has attracted the attention of the Dutch government, who asked one of the initiators of the project to write an essay about how to 'build' villages.

Recently, a Dutch journalist wrote a book about the project called 'Vital Villages', in which the thoughts and deeds of the 'village movement' are documented.

== Atlantic Wall ==
In the dune landscape around Wijk aan Zee some bunkers still remain of the Atlantic Wall, built by the German occupying forces between 1940 and 1944. These coastal defence works (kustverdedigingswerken in Dutch) formed part of the so-called "Fortress IJmuiden" (Festung IJmuiden in German). The purpose of the Fortress IJmuiden was to protect the port of IJmuiden and the nearby steelworks against attacks from the Allies. All of these defences were protected by a combination of mine fields, tank ditches, and dams, some of which ran kilometres deep inland. In November 1942 it was decided there would be a complete evacuation of the inhabitants of Wijk aan Zee to the inland country. Many inhabitants withdrew to Beverwijk and Velsen. On 12 August 1943 the occupants were permitted to return at their own risk, but on 15 October 1943 the village was once again evacuated.

On the dunes behind Hotel de Wijk, a radar bunker was constructed by the Germans. This was aimed at intercepting enemy ships and planes. These radar screens had a height of twenty meters and for this reason had to be deeply set in the concrete of the bunker. These radar installations were called Mammoths' Teeth, (Mammutstanden in Dutch). In total there were four places in the Netherlands where these "Mammoths’ Teeth" stood: Den Helder, Oostkapelle, The Hague and Wijk aan Zee.

In the summer of 1944, after the landings of the Allies, Velsen and some parts of Beverwijk were also evacuated. The occupants of Wijk aan Zee then had to move still further away from their village, generally to Haarlem or Amsterdam. After the liberation and as of 8 June 1945 the people could return to their mostly empty houses.

The German troops that remained were kept by Allied soldiers and Dutch citizen soldiers as prisoners of war and were kept temporarily in still empty apartments. Before they would return to Germany, they were forced to clear the dams and mine fields. The manner in which this happened was indeed cruel: the soldiers had to clear an area of mines completely by walking arm in arm in wide rows. Some German soldiers lost their lives in this clearing of mines. Some rural occupants didn't like the idea of de-mining being finished so quickly and so it could be that the German soldiers searched at least one area for mines where they knew for certain mines had indeed been laid. However, the citizen population had personally removed the mines earlier in that area to be able to enter for poaching purposes.

When the village had been safely cleared, the German soldiers were sent back to Germany.

== Art ==
The beach at Wijk Aan Zee was used in 1999 as the site for Aleksandra Mir's performance First Woman on the Moon.

== Gallery ==
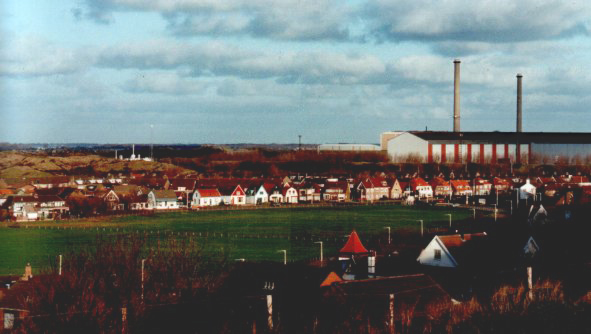
1995

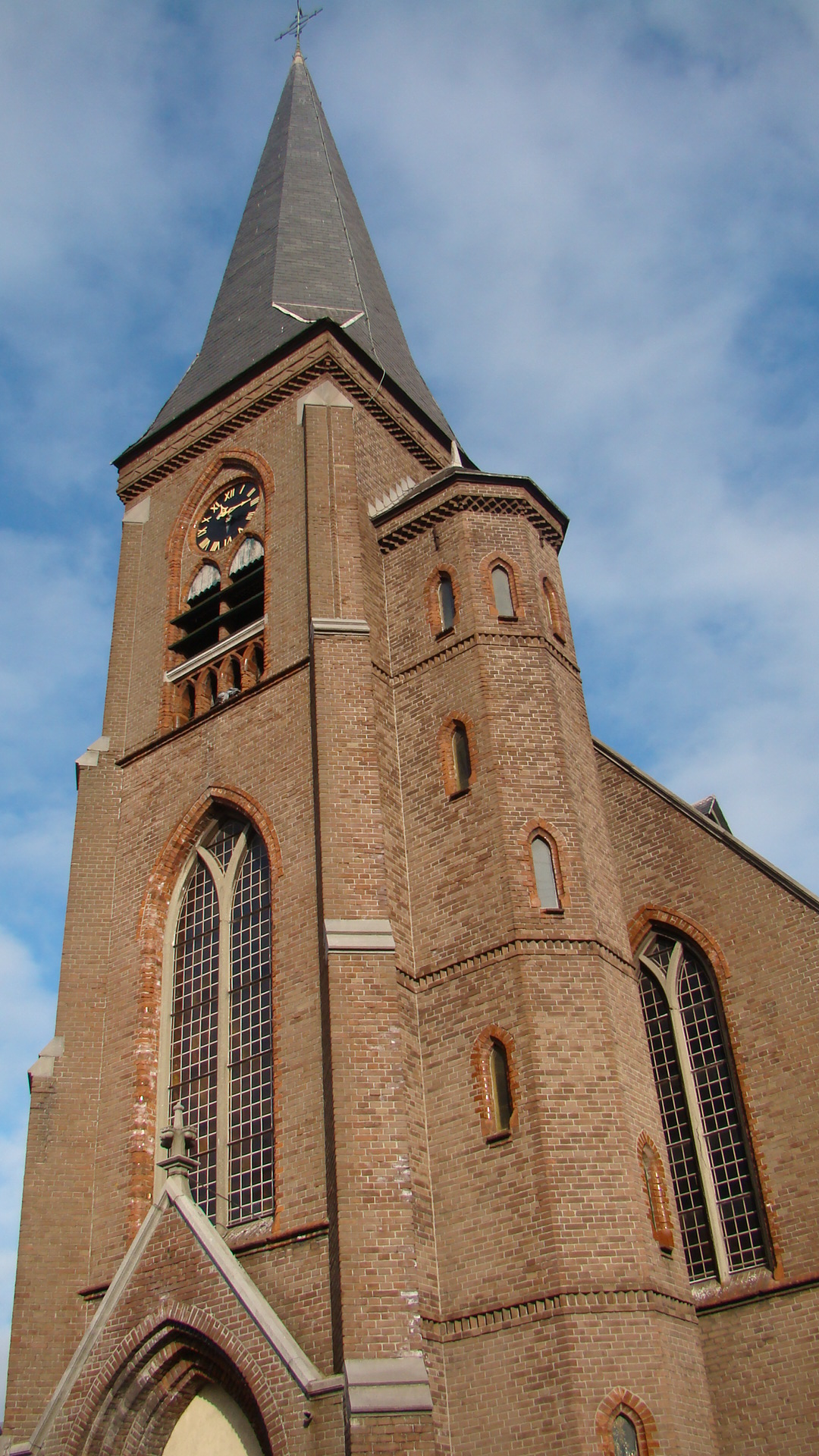
Catholic church

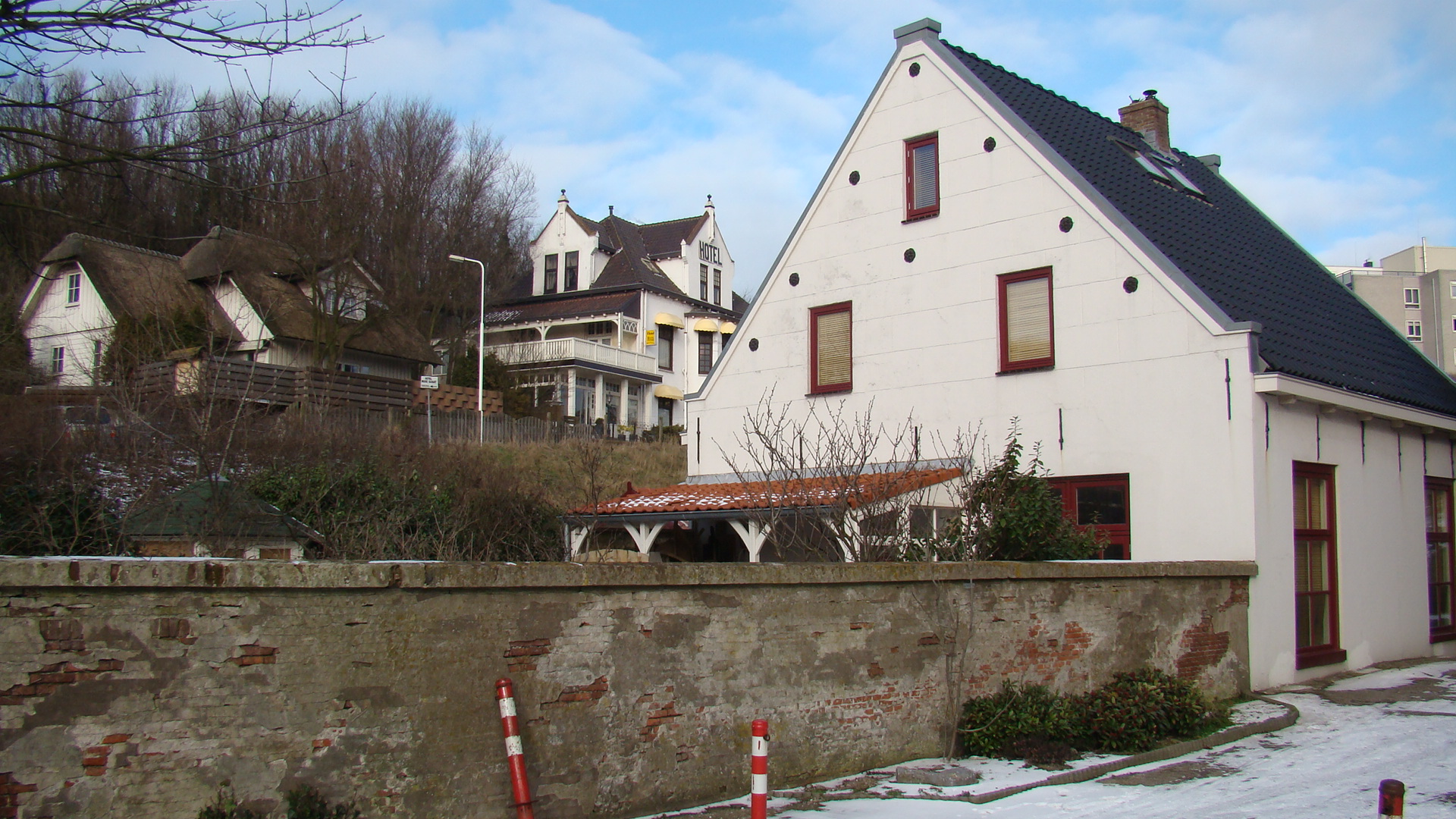
Houses

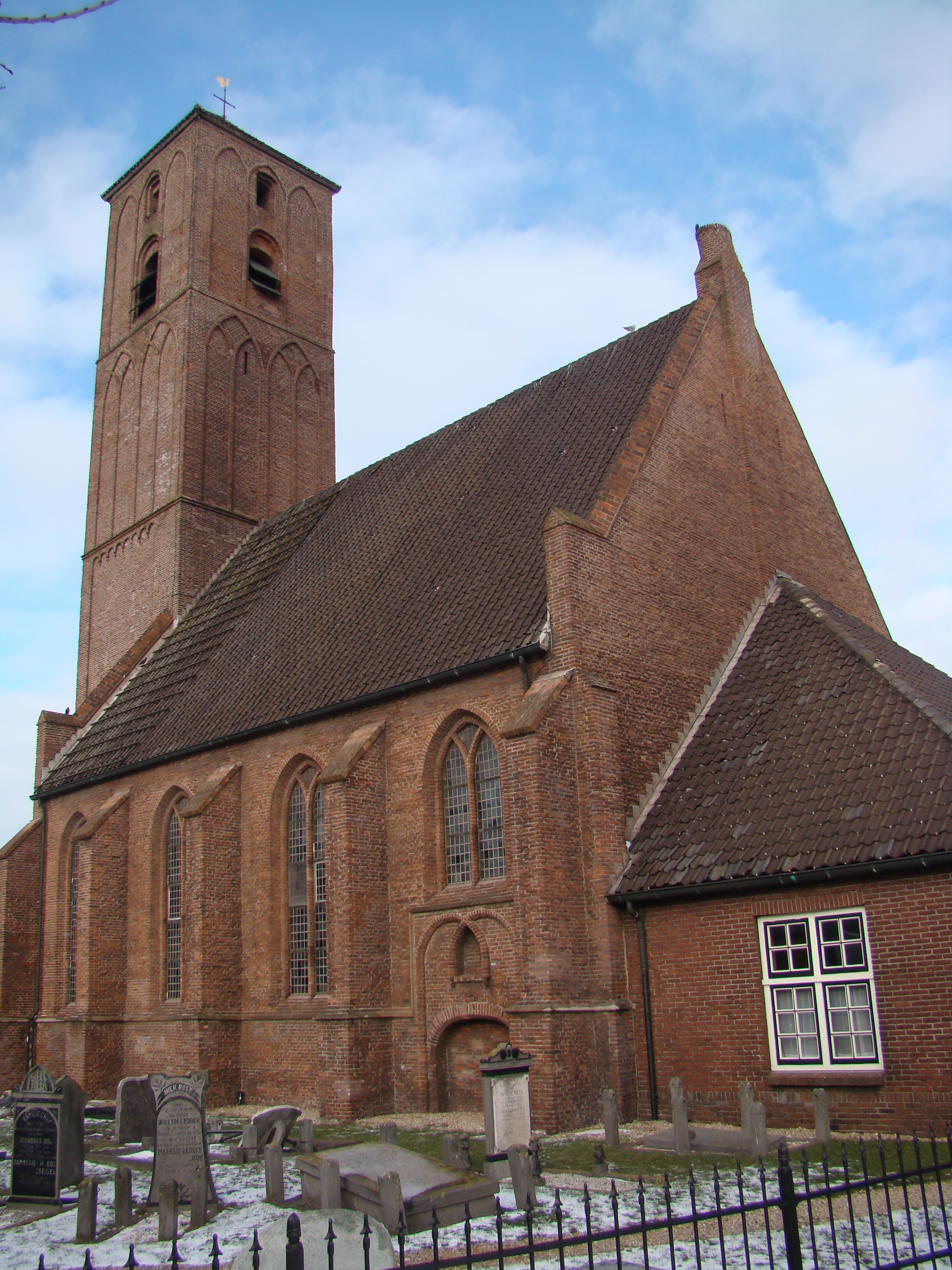
Village church

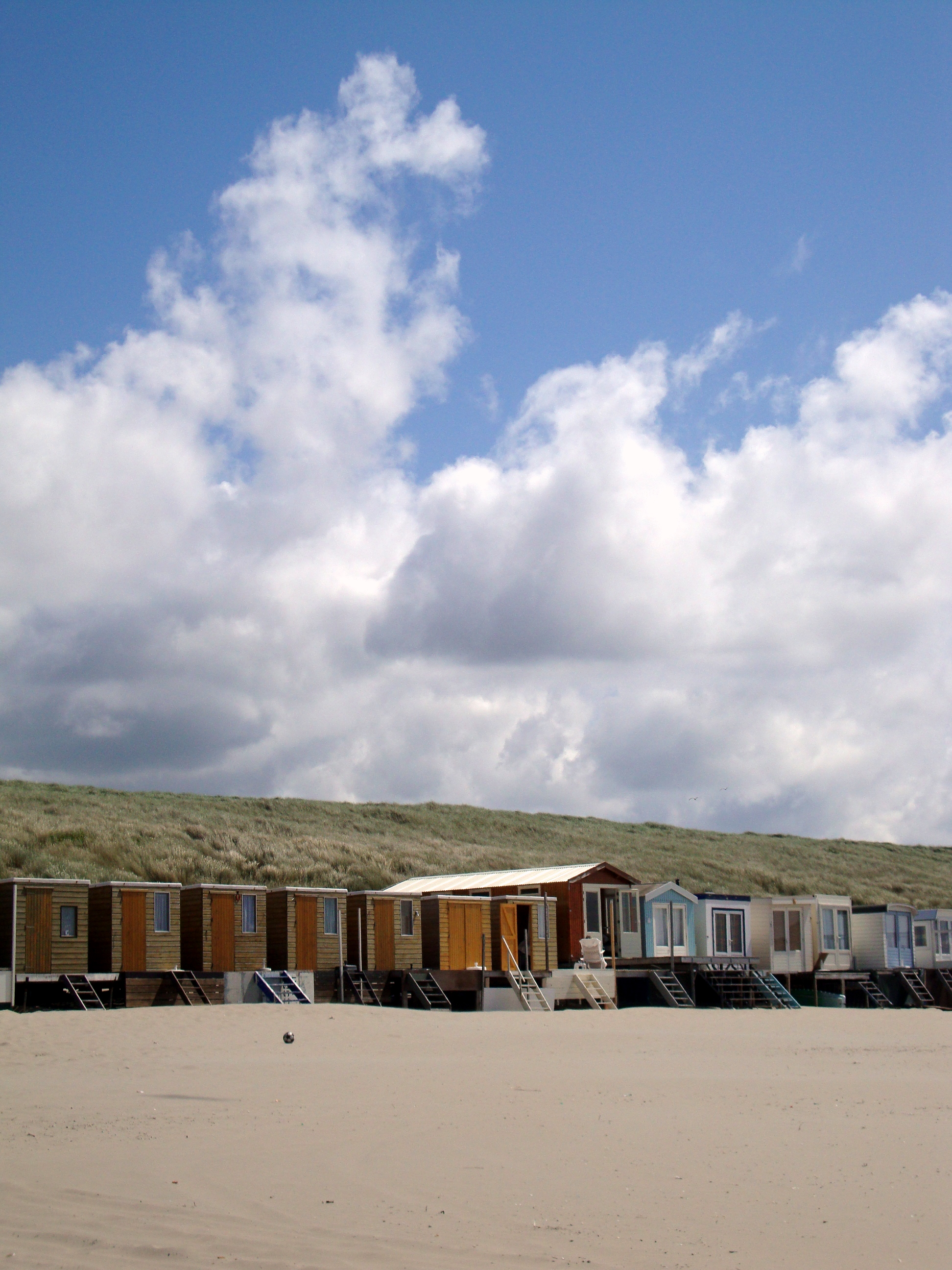
Beach houses
