= List of strong chess tournaments =

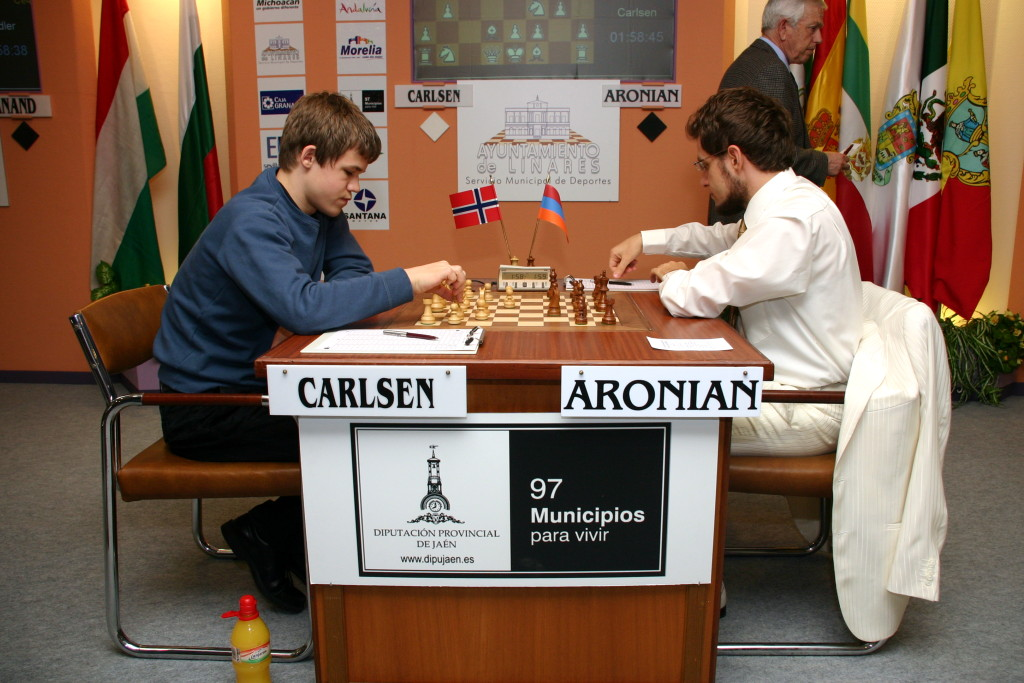
Magnus Carlsen vs. Levon Aronian at Linares 2007

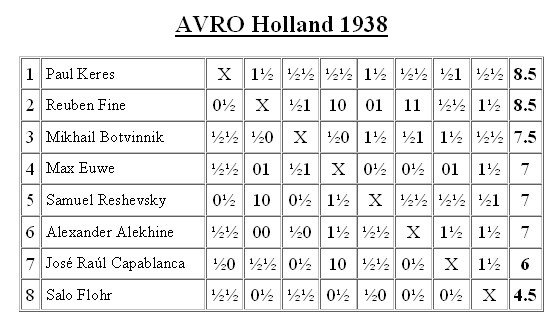
Typical tournament crosstable, showing individual and total scores

This article covers many of the strongest chess tournaments in history.

The following list is not intended to be an exhaustive or definitive record of tournament chess, but takes as its foundation the collective opinion of chess experts and journalists over the strongest tournaments in history. This list excludes World Chess Championship matches between two players but includes knockout FIDE World Championships as those are played between many players. Rapid & Blitz events and team events like the Chess Olympiad are also not included in this list.

Events that merit inclusion have been largely judged according to the strength (and relative strength in depth) of their participants. Other factors were taken into account, but have less influence; for example the quality of chess played, the closeness of the contest and the number of world top 10 or 'big reputation' players who took part, and the time control (no fast chess tournaments are listed). Inevitably, this introduces a degree of subjectivity, but the vast majority of tournaments in the list range from FIDE Category 10 to FIDE category 21 and beyond.

The names of the tournament winners have been included next to the year and venue. Many of the tournaments have had books written about them and whilst these will be mostly out of print, they are occasionally available at online auction sites, second-hand specialist book shops etc.

No attempt is made at comparing the relative strengths of tournaments in the list, as this is, and continues to be, the subject of inconclusive debate amongst experts.

While events are listed in year order, they are not listed chronologically within the same year.

== Tournaments and winners ==
=== 1850–1859 ===
Year	Tournament	Location	Winner	Ref
1851	London 1851 chess tournament	London	Adolf Anderssen	
1851	London Club	London	Adolf Anderssen	
1857		Manchester	Johann Löwenthal	
1857	American Chess Congress	New York	Paul Morphy	
1858		Birmingham	Johann Löwenthal	

=== 1860–1869 ===
Year	Tournament	Location	Winner	Ref
1861		Bristol	Louis Paulsen	
1862	London 1862 chess tournament	London	Adolf Anderssen	
1865		Dublin	Wilhelm Steinitz	
1867	Paris 1867 chess tournament	Paris	Ignác Kolisch	
1867		Dundee	Gustav Neumann	
1868	WDSB Congress	Aachen	Max Lange	
1869	NDSB Congress	Hamburg	Adolf Anderssen	
1869	WDSB Congress	Barmen	Adolf Anderssen	

=== 1870–1879 ===
Year	Tournament	Location	Winner	Ref
1870	Baden-Baden 1870 chess tournament	Baden-Baden	Adolf Anderssen	
1871	WDSB Congress	Krefeld	Louis Paulsen	
1872	NDSB Congress	Altona	Adolf Anderssen	
1872		London	Wilhelm Steinitz	
1873	Vienna 1873 chess tournament	Vienna	Wilhelm Steinitz	
1874	American Chess Congress	Chicago	George Henry Mackenzie	
1876		New York	George Henry Mackenzie	
1876	American Chess Congress	Philadelphia	James Mason	
1876	Clipper	New York	James Mason	
1876	MDSB Congress	Leipzig	Adolf Anderssen	
1876		London	Joseph Henry Blackburne	
1877	MDSB Congress	Leipzig	Louis Paulsen	
1878	Paris 1878 chess tournament	Paris	Johannes Zukertort	
1878	WDSB Congress	Frankfurt	Louis Paulsen	
1879		London	Henry Edward Bird	
1879	DSB Congress	Leipzig	Berthold Englisch	

=== 1880–1889 ===
Year	Tournament	Location	Winner(s)	Ref
1880		Wiesbaden	Joseph Henry Blackburne; Berthold Englisch; Adolf Schwarz	
1880	WDSB Congress	Braunschweig	Louis Paulsen	
1881	Berlin 1881 chess tournament (DSB Congress)	Berlin	Joseph Henry Blackburne	
1882	Vienna 1882 chess tournament	Vienna	Wilhelm Steinitz; Szymon Winawer	
1883	London 1883 chess tournament	London	Johannes Zukertort	
1883	DSB Congress	Nuremberg	Szymon Winawer	
1885	DSB Congress	Hamburg	Isidor Gunsberg	
1885		Hereford	Joseph Henry Blackburne	
1886	BCA Congress	London	Joseph Henry Blackburne	
1886		Belfast	William H. K. Pollock	
1886		Nottingham	Amos Burn	
1887	DSB Congress	Frankfurt	George Henry Mackenzie	
1887		London	Amos Burn; Isidor Gunsberg	
1888		Leipzig	Curt von Bardeleben; Fritz Riemann	
1888		Bradford	Isidor Gunsberg	
1889		Amsterdam	Amos Burn	
1889	American Chess Congress	New York	Max Weiss; Mikhail Chigorin	
1889	DSB Congress	Breslau	Siegbert Tarrasch	

=== 1890–1899 ===
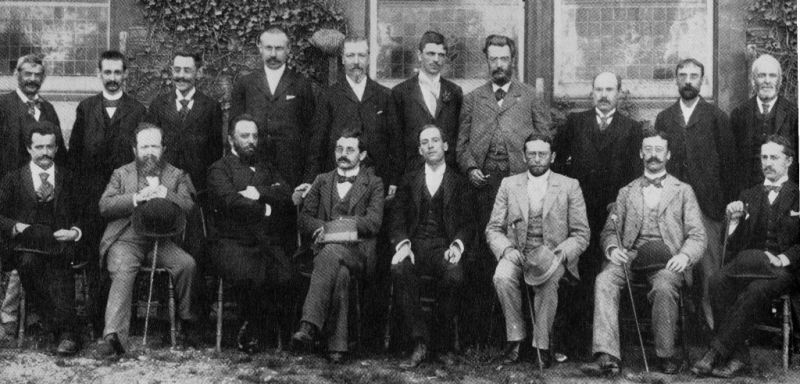
Masters at Hastings 1895 Standing: Albin, Schlechter, Janowski, Marco, Blackburne, Maróczy, Schiffers, Gunsberg, Burn, Tinsley. Seated: Vergani, Steinitz, Chigorin, Lasker, Pillsbury, Tarrasch, Mieses, Teichmann. Absent: von Bardeleben, Mason, Pollock, Walbrodt.

Year	Tournament	Location	Winner(s)	Ref
1890		Manchester	Siegbert Tarrasch	
1890		Vienna	Max Weiss	
1890		Graz	Gyula Makovetz	
1890		Berlin	Emanuel Lasker; Berthold Lasker	
1891		Berlin	Horatio Caro	
1892	DSB Congress	Dresden	Siegbert Tarrasch	
1892		London	Emanuel Lasker	
1893		New York	Emanuel Lasker	
1894	DSB Congress	Leipzig	Siegbert Tarrasch	
1894		New York	Wilhelm Steinitz	
1895	Hastings 1895 chess tournament	Hastings	Harry Nelson Pillsbury	
1895/96	Saint Petersburg 1895–96 chess tournament	Saint Petersburg	Emanuel Lasker	
1896		Budapest	Mikhail Chigorin	
1896	Nuremberg 1896 chess tournament	Nuremberg	Emanuel Lasker	
1897	Schachverein Centrum	Berlin	Curt von Bardeleben	
1897	Berlin 1897 chess tournament	Berlin	Charousek	
1898		Budapest	Charousek	
1898	DSB Congress	Cologne	Amos Burn	
1898	Vienna 1898 chess tournament	Vienna	Siegbert Tarrasch	
1899	London 1899 chess tournament	London	Emanuel Lasker	
1899/1900		Vienna	Géza Maróczy	

=== 1900–1909 ===
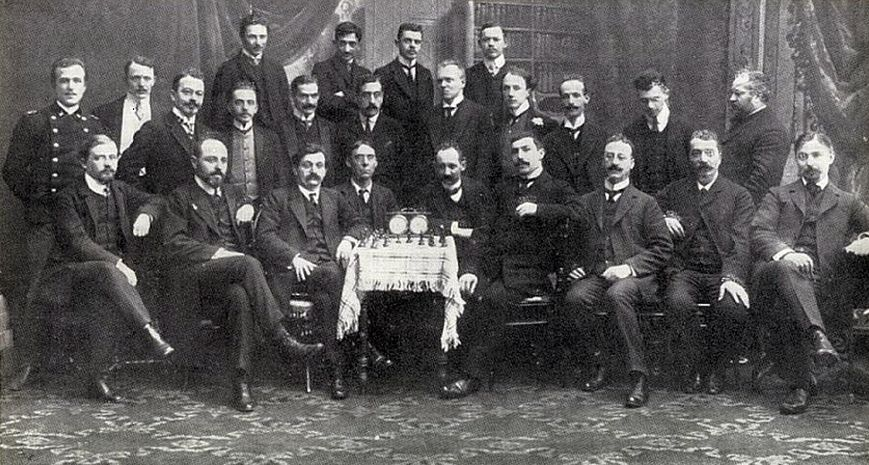
St. Petersburg, 1909

Year	Tournament	Location	Winner(s)	Ref
1900	Paris 1900 chess tournament	Paris	Emanuel Lasker	
1900	DSB Congress	Munich	Harry Nelson Pillsbury; Carl Schlechter	
1901	Monte Carlo chess tournament	Monte Carlo	Dawid Janowski	
1901	Russian Chess Championship	Moscow	Mikhail Chigorin	
1902		Vienna	Dawid Janowski; Heinrich Wolf	
1902		Monte Carlo	Géza Maróczy	
1902	DSB Congress	Hannover	Dawid Janowski	
1903		Monte Carlo	Siegbert Tarrasch	
1904	1904 Cambridge Springs International Chess Congress	Cambridge Springs	Frank Marshall	
1904		Monte Carlo	Géza Maróczy	
1904	DSB Congress	Coburg	Curt von Bardeleben; Carl Schlechter; Rudolf Swiderski	
1905		Ostend	Géza Maróczy	
1905		Barmen	Dawid Janowski; Géza Maróczy	
1906		Ostend	Carl Schlechter	
1906		Stockholm	Ossip Bernstein; Carl Schlechter	
1906	DSB Congress	Nuremberg	Frank Marshall	
1906	Russian Chess Championship	Saint Petersburg	Salwe	
1907	Leopold Trebitsch Memorial Tournament	Vienna	Jacques Mieses	
1907	Ostend 1907 chess tournament	Ostend	Siegbert Tarrasch	
1907	Carlsbad 1907 chess tournament	Carlsbad	Akiba Rubinstein	
1908	Vienna 1908 chess tournament	Vienna	Géza Maróczy; Carl Schlechter; Oldřich Duras	
1908	Prague 1908 chess tournament	Prague	Oldřich Duras; Carl Schlechter	
1909	Chigorin Memorial	St. Petersburg	Emanuel Lasker; Akiba Rubinstein	

=== 1910–1919 ===
Year	Tournament	Location	Winner(s)	Ref
1910	DSB Congress	Hamburg	Carl Schlechter	
1910/11		Vienna	Carl Schlechter	
1911		New York	Frank Marshall	
1911	San Sebastián chess tournament	San Sebastián	José Raúl Capablanca	
1911	Carlsbad 1911 chess tournament	Carlsbad	Richard Teichmann	
1912		San Sebastián	Akiba Rubinstein	
1912	Bad Pistyan	Piešťany	Akiba Rubinstein	
1912		Budapest	Frank Marshall; Carl Schlechter	
1912	Russian Chess Championship	Vilnius	Akiba Rubinstein	
1912	DSB Congress	Breslau	Akiba Rubinstein; Oldřich Duras	
1913		New York	José Raúl Capablanca	
1913		Havana	Frank Marshall	
1913		Vienna	Carl Schlechter	
1913	Vienna Club	Vienna	Rudolf Spielmann	
1914	Russian Chess Championship	St Petersburg	Alexander Alekhine; Aron Nimzowitsch	
1914	St. Petersburg 1914 chess tournament	St Petersburg	Emanuel Lasker	
1914		Baden bei Wien	Rudolf Spielmann	
1914	DSB Congress (Mannheim 1914 chess tournament)	Mannheim	Alexander Alekhine	
1914		Vienna	Carl Schlechter	
1915		New York	José Raúl Capablanca	
1916/17		Vienna	Carl Schlechter	
1917/18		Vienna	Milan Vidmar	
1918		Berlin	Emanuel Lasker	
1918	Four Masters	Berlin	Milan Vidmar	
1918		Kaschau	Richard Réti	
1918		New York	José Raúl Capablanca	
1919		Stockholm	Rudolf Spielmann	
1919		Hastings	José Raúl Capablanca	

=== 1920–1929 ===
Year	Tournament	Location	Winner(s)	Ref
1920		Amsterdam	Richard Réti	
1920		Gothenburg	Richard Réti	
1920		Berlin	Gyula Breyer	
1921		Kiel	Efim Bogoljubov	
1921		Triberg	Alexander Alekhine	
1921		Budapest	Alexander Alekhine	
1921		The Hague	Alexander Alekhine	
1921		Triberg (2)	Akiba Rubinstein	
1922	Bad Pistyan	Piešťany	Efim Bogoljubov	
1922		London	José Raúl Capablanca	
1922		Vienna	Akiba Rubinstein	
1922		Teplitz-Schönau	Richard Réti; Rudolf Spielmann	
1922		Hastings	Alexander Alekhine	
1922/23	Hastings International Chess Congress	Hastings	Akiba Rubinstein	
1923		Margate	Ernst Grünfeld	
1923	Liverpool 1923 chess tournament	Liverpool	Jacques Mieses	
1923	Carlsbad 1923 chess tournament	Carlsbad	Alexander Alekhine; Efim Bogoljubov; Géza Maróczy	
1923		Vienna	Savielly Tartakower	
1923	Moravská Ostrava 1923 chess tournament	Ostrava	Emanuel Lasker	
1923		Copenhagen	Aron Nimzowitsch	
1924	New York 1924 chess tournament	New York	Emanuel Lasker	
1924		Meran	Ernst Grünfeld	
1924	USSR Chess Championship	Moscow	Efim Bogoljubov	
1924/25		Hastings	Géza Maróczy; Savielly Tartakower	
1925		Debrecen	Hans Kmoch	
1925		Baden-Baden	Alexander Alekhine	
1925		Paris	Alexander Alekhine	
1925	DSB Congress	Breslau	Efim Bogoljubov	
1925		Marienbad	Akiba Rubinstein; Aron Nimzowitsch	
1925	Moscow 1925 chess tournament	Moscow	Efim Bogoljubov	
1925	USSR Chess Championship	Leningrad	Efim Bogoljubov	
1925/26		Hastings	Alexander Alekhine; Milan Vidmar	
1926		Hannover	Aron Nimzowitsch	
1926		Budapest	Ernst Grünfeld; Mario Monticelli	
1926		Semmering	Rudolf Spielmann	
1926		Lake Hopatcong	José Raúl Capablanca	
1926		Chicago	Frank Marshall	
1926		Dresden	Aron Nimzowitsch	
1926		Berlin	Efim Bogoljubov	
1927		London	Aron Nimzowitsch; Savielly Tartakower	
1927		Kecskemét	Alexander Alekhine	
1927		Bad Homburg	Efim Bogoljubov	
1927	DSB Congress	Magdeburg	Rudolf Spielmann	
1927	New York 1927 chess tournament	New York	José Raúl Capablanca	
1928		Budapest	José Raúl Capablanca	
1928		Vienna	Richard Réti	
1928		Dortmund	Friedrich Sämisch	
1928	Bad Kissingen 1928 chess tournament	Bad Kissingen	Efim Bogoljubov	
1928		Berlin	José Raúl Capablanca	
1928	BSG	Berlin	Aron Nimzowitsch	
1929	Carlsbad 1929 chess tournament	Carlsbad	Aron Nimzowitsch	
1929		Bradley Beach	Alexander Alekhine	
1929		Budapest	José Raúl Capablanca	
1929		Barcelona	José Raúl Capablanca	
1929		Rogaska Slatina	Akiba Rubinstein	
1929/30		Hastings	José Raúl Capablanca	

=== 1930–1939 ===
Year	Tournament	Location	Winner(s)	Ref
1930		Frankfurt	Aron Nimzowitsch	
1930		Stockholm	Isaac Kashdan	
1930	San Remo 1930 chess tournament	Sanremo	Alexander Alekhine	
1930		Scarborough	Edgar Colle	
1930		Amsterdam	Henri Weenink	
1930		Liège	Savielly Tartakower	
1930/31		Hastings	Max Euwe	
1931	New York 1931 chess tournament	New York	José Raúl Capablanca	
1931		Rotterdam	Salo Landau	
1931	Bled 1931 chess tournament	Bled	Alexander Alekhine	
1931/32		Hastings	Salo Flohr	
1932		Bad Sliač	Salo Flohr; Milan Vidmar	
1932		London	Alexander Alekhine	
1932		Pasadena	Alexander Alekhine	
1932		Bern	Alexander Alekhine	
1932		Mexico City	Alexander Alekhine; Isaac Kashdan	
1932/33		Hastings	Salo Flohr	
1933		Paris	Alexander Alekhine	
1933		Scheveningen	Salo Flohr	
1933/34		Hastings	Salo Flohr	
1934		Syracuse	Samuel Reshevsky	
1934		Zurich	Alexander Alekhine	
1934		Ujpest	Andor Lilienthal	
1934		Leningrad	Mikhail Botvinnik	
1934/35		Hastings	Max Euwe; Salo Flohr; George Alan Thomas	
1935		Moscow	Mikhail Botvinnik; Salo Flohr	
1935		Margate	Samuel Reshevsky	
1935/36		Hastings	Reuben Fine	
1936		Margate	Salo Flohr	
1936	U.S. Chess Championship	New York	Samuel Reshevsky	
1936		Bad Nauheim	Alexander Alekhine; Paul Keres	
1936		Zandvoort	Reuben Fine	
1936		Amsterdam	Max Euwe; Reuben Fine	
1936		Dresden	Alexander Alekhine	
1936		Moscow	José Raúl Capablanca	
1936	Nottingham 1936 chess tournament	Nottingham	Mikhail Botvinnik; José Raúl Capablanca	
1936		Poděbrady	Salo Flohr	
1936/37		Hastings	Alexander Alekhine	
1937	Kemeri 1937 chess tournament	Kemeri	Salo Flohr; Vladimirs Petrovs; Samuel Reshevsky	
1937		Pärnu	Paul Felix Schmidt	
1937		Margate	Reuben Fine; Paul Keres	
1937		Ostend	Reuben Fine; Henri Grob; Paul Keres	
1937		Bad Nauheim, Stuttgart, Garmisch	Max Euwe	
1937		Semmering/Baden	Paul Keres	
1937		Moscow	Reuben Fine	
1937/38		Hastings	Samuel Reshevsky	
1938		Noordwijk	Erich Eliskases	
1938	U.S. Chess Championship	New York	Samuel Reshevsky	
1938	AVRO 1938 chess tournament	Netherlands	Paul Keres; Reuben Fine	
1938/39		Hastings	László Szabó	
1939		Amsterdam	Max Euwe; László Szabó; Salo Flohr	
1939	VARA	Amsterdam	Max Euwe; Salo Landau	
1939		Leningrad, Moscow	Salo Flohr	
1939	U.S. Open Chess Championship	New York	Reuben Fine	
1939		Margate	Paul Keres	
1939		Stuttgart	Efim Bogoljubov	
1939		Bournemouth	Max Euwe	
1939	USSR Chess Championship	Leningrad	Mikhail Botvinnik	

=== 1940–1949 ===
Year	Tournament	Location	Winner(s)	Ref
1940	U.S. Chess Championship	New York	Samuel Reshevsky	
1940	USSR Chess Championship	Moscow	Andor Lilienthal; Igor Bondarevsky	
1941	USSR Absolute Championship	Leningrad, Moscow	Mikhail Botvinnik	
1941		Mar del Plata	Gideon Ståhlberg	
1941	Munich 1941 chess tournament	Munich	Gösta Stoltz	
1941	General Government chess tournament	Kraków, Warsaw	Alexander Alekhine; Paul Felix Schmidt	
1942	Mar del Plata chess tournament	Mar del Plata	Miguel Najdorf	
1942	Salzburg 1942 chess tournament	Salzburg	Alexander Alekhine	
1942	1942 European Individual Chess Championship	Munich	Alexander Alekhine	
1942		Prague	Alexander Alekhine; Klaus Junge	
1943		Mar del Plata	Miguel Najdorf	
1943		Sverdlovsk	Mikhail Botvinnik	
1943		Baku	Salo Flohr	
1943		Prague	Alexander Alekhine	
1943		Salzburg	Paul Keres; Alexander Alekhine	
1944		Mar del Plata	Hermann Pilnik; Miguel Najdorf	
1944		La Plata	Miguel Najdorf	
1944		Kyiv	Salo Flohr	
1944	USSR Chess Championship	Moscow	Mikhail Botvinnik	
1945		Hollywood	Samuel Reshevsky	
1945		Mar del Plata	Miguel Najdorf	
1945		Buenos Aires	Miguel Najdorf	
1945	USSR Chess Championship	Moscow	Mikhail Botvinnik	
1946		Mar del Plata	Miguel Najdorf	
1946	Groningen 1946 chess tournament	Groningen	Mikhail Botvinnik	
1947		Moscow	Mikhail Botvinnik	
1947		Pärnu	Paul Keres	
1947		Warsaw	Svetozar Gligorić	
1947		Mar del Plata	Miguel Najdorf	
1947		Buenos Aires, La Plata	Gideon Ståhlberg	
1947	USSR Chess Championship	Leningrad	Paul Keres	
1948		Mar del Plata	Erich Eliskases	
1948		Buenos Aires, La Plata	Miguel Najdorf; Gideon Ståhlberg	
1948		Venice	Miguel Najdorf	
1948	World Chess Championship 1948	The Hague, Moscow	Mikhail Botvinnik	
1948	Interzonal Tournament	Saltsjöbaden	David Bronstein	
1948	USSR Chess Championship	Moscow	David Bronstein; Alexander Kotov	
1948/49		New York	Reuben Fine	
1949	USSR Chess Championship	Moscow	David Bronstein; Vasily Smyslov	

=== 1950–1959 ===
Year	Tournament	Location	Winner(s)	Ref
1950		Amsterdam	Miguel Najdorf	
1950		Szczawno Zdrój	Paul Keres	
1950		Venice	Alexander Kotov	
1950	Candidates Tournament	Budapest	David Bronstein	
1950	USSR Chess Championship	Moscow	Paul Keres	
1951		New York	Samuel Reshevsky	
1951		Birmingham	Svetozar Gligorić	
1951	USSR Chess Championship	Moscow	Paul Keres	
1952		Havana	Samuel Reshevsky; Miguel Najdorf	
1952		Budapest	Paul Keres	
1952	Interzonal Tournament	Saltsjöbaden	Alexander Kotov	
1952	USSR Chess Championship	Moscow	Mikhail Botvinnik	
1953		Bucharest	Alexander Tolush	
1953		Gagra	Vasily Smyslov	
1953	Candidates Tournament	Zurich	Vasily Smyslov	
1954		Belgrade	David Bronstein	
1954	USSR Chess Championship	Kyiv	Yuri Averbakh	
1954/55		Hastings	Paul Keres; Vasily Smyslov	
1955		Mar del Plata	Borislav Ivkov	
1955		Zagreb	Vasily Smyslov	
1955	Interzonal Tournament	Gothenburg	David Bronstein	
1955	USSR Chess Championship	Moscow	Efim Geller	
1955/56		Hastings	Viktor Korchnoi	
1956		Moscow	Mikhail Botvinnik; Vasily Smyslov	
1956	Candidates Tournament	Amsterdam	Vasily Smyslov	
1956	USSR Chess Championship	Leningrad	Mark Taimanov	
1957	USSR Chess Championship	Moscow	Mikhail Tal	
1957/58		Hastings	Paul Keres	
1958	USSR Chess Championship	Riga	Mikhail Tal	
1958	Interzonal Tournament	Portorož	Mikhail Tal	
1959		Moscow	David Bronstein; Vasily Smyslov; Boris Spassky	
1959		Zurich	Mikhail Tal	
1959		Dresden	Efim Geller; Mark Taimanov	
1959		Riga	Boris Spassky	
1959	Candidates Tournament	Bled, Zagreb, Belgrade	Mikhail Tal	
1959	USSR Chess Championship	Tbilisi	Tigran Petrosian	

=== 1960–1969 ===
Year	Tournament	Location	Winner(s)	Ref
1960		Mar del Plata	Robert James Fischer; Boris Spassky	
1960		Buenos Aires	Viktor Korchnoi; Samuel Reshevsky	
1960		Santa Fe	László Szabó; Mark Taimanov	
1960		Copenhagen	Tigran Petrosian	
1960	USSR Chess Championship	Leningrad	Viktor Korchnoi	
1960		Córdoba	Viktor Korchnoi	
1960		Moscow	Vasily Smyslov; Ratmir Kholmov	
1961	USSR Chess Championship	Moscow	Tigran Petrosian	
1961	USSR Chess Championship	Baku	Boris Spassky	
1961		Bled	Mikhail Tal	
1961		Zurich	Paul Keres	
1961		Dortmund	Mark Taimanov	
1961		Budapest	Viktor Korchnoi	
1961/62		Hastings	Mikhail Botvinnik	
1962	Capablanca Memorial	Havana	Miguel Najdorf	
1962	Interzonal Tournament	Stockholm	Robert James Fischer	
1962	Candidates Tournament	Willemstad	Tigran Petrosian	
1962	USSR Chess Championship	Yerevan	Viktor Korchnoi	
1962/63	U.S. Chess Championship	New York	Robert James Fischer	
1963	Piatigorsky Cup	Los Angeles	Paul Keres; Tigran Petrosian	
1963		Havana	Viktor Korchnoi	
1963		Moscow	Vasily Smyslov	
1963		Sochi	Lev Polugaevsky	
1963	USSR Chess Championship	Leningrad	Leonid Stein	
1963/64	U.S. Chess Championship	New York	Robert James Fischer	
1964		Belgrade	Boris Spassky	
1964		Buenos Aires	Paul Keres; Tigran Petrosian	
1964	Zonal Tournament	Moscow	Boris Spassky	
1964	Interzonal Tournament	Amsterdam	Vasily Smyslov; Bent Larsen; Boris Spassky; Mikhail Tal	
1964/65	USSR Chess Championship	Kyiv	Viktor Korchnoi	
1965		Yerevan	Viktor Korchnoi	
1965		Havana	Vasily Smyslov	
1965		Santiago	Vasily Smyslov	
1965		Zagreb	Borislav Ivkov; Wolfgang Uhlmann	
1965	USSR Chess Championship	Tallinn	Leonid Stein	
1965/66	U.S. Chess Championship	New York	Robert James Fischer	
1966	Piatigorsky Cup	Santa Monica	Boris Spassky	
1966		Mar del Plata	Vasily Smyslov	
1966		Moscow	Tigran Petrosian	
1966		Sochi	Viktor Korchnoi	
1966		Kislovodsk	Efim Geller	
1966/67	USSR Chess Championship	Tbilisi	Leonid Stein	
1966/67	U.S. Chess Championship	New York	Robert James Fischer	
1967		Beverwijk	Boris Spassky	
1967	Monte Carlo chess tournament	Monte Carlo	Robert James Fischer	
1967		Havana	Bent Larsen	
1967		Winnipeg	Bent Larsen; Klaus Darga	
1967		Venice	Jan Hein Donner	
1967		Moscow	Leonid Stein	
1967		Palma de Mallorca	Bent Larsen	
1967		Skopje	Robert James Fischer	
1967	Interzonal Tournament	Sousse	Bent Larsen	
1967	USSR Chess Championship	Kharkov	Mikhail Tal; Lev Polugaevsky	
1968	Corus chess tournament	Wijk aan Zee	Viktor Korchnoi	
1968		Monte Carlo	Bent Larsen	
1968		Bamberg	Paul Keres	
1968		Skopje, Ohrid	Lajos Portisch	
1968		Gori	Mikhail Tal	
1968		Palma de Mallorca	Viktor Korchnoi	
1968/69	USSR Chess Championship	Alma-Ata	Lev Polugaevsky	
1969		Wijk aan Zee	Mikhail Botvinnik; Efim Geller	
1969		Buesum	Bent Larsen	
1969		San Juan	Boris Spassky	
1969		Palma de Mallorca	Bent Larsen	
1969		Belgrade	Lev Polugaevsky; Borislav Ivkov; Svetozar Gligorić; Milan Matulovic	
1969	USSR Chess Championship	Moscow	Tigran Petrosian	
1969/70		Hastings	Lajos Portisch	

=== 1970–1979 ===
Year	Tournament	Location	Winner(s)	Ref
1970	IBM international chess tournament	Amsterdam	Boris Spassky; Lev Polugaevsky	
1970		Rovinj, Zagreb	Robert James Fischer	
1970		Buenos Aires	Robert James Fischer	
1970		Leiden	Boris Spassky	
1970		Vinkovci	Bent Larsen	
1970	Interzonal Tournament	Palma de Mallorca	Robert James Fischer	
1970	USSR Chess Championship	Riga	Viktor Korchnoi	
1971		Wijk aan Zee	Viktor Korchnoi	
1971		Pärnu	Leonid Stein	
1971		Moscow	Anatoly Karpov; Leonid Stein	
1971		Tallinn	Paul Keres; Mikhail Tal	
1971		Amsterdam	Vasily Smyslov	
1971		Palma de Mallorca	Oscar Panno; Ljubomir Ljubojević	
1971	USSR Chess Championship	Leningrad	Vladimir Savon	
1971/72		Hastings	Anatoly Karpov; Viktor Korchnoi	
1972		Wijk aan Zee	Lajos Portisch	
1972		Amsterdam	Lev Polugaevsky	
1972		Teesside	Bent Larsen	
1972		Kislovodsk	Lev Polugaevsky	
1972		Las Palmas	Lajos Portisch	
1972		Sarajevo	László Szabó	
1972		San Antonio	Lajos Portisch; Tigran Petrosian; Anatoly Karpov	
1972		Palma de Mallorca	Oscar Panno; Viktor Korchnoi; Jan Smejkal	
1972	USSR Chess Championship	Baku	Mikhail Tal	
1973		Amsterdam	Tigran Petrosian; Albin Planinc	
1973		Tallinn	Mikhail Tal	
1973		Sochi	Mikhail Tal	
1973		Dortmund	Boris Spassky; Hans-Joachim Hecht; Ulf Andersson	
1973		Las Palmas	Tigran Petrosian; Leonid Stein	
1973		Madrid	Anatoly Karpov	
1973	Interzonal Tournament	Leningrad	Viktor Korchnoi; Anatoly Karpov	
1973	Interzonal Tournament	Petropolis	Henrique Mecking	
1973	USSR Chess Championship	Moscow	Boris Spassky	
1974		Manila	Evgeni Vasiukov	
1974		Las Palmas	Ljubomir Ljubojević	
1974		Solingen	Lubomir Kavalek; Lev Polugaevsky	
1974	USSR Chess Championship	Leningrad	Mikhail Tal; Alexander Beliavsky	
1975		Wijk aan Zee	Lajos Portisch	
1975		Amsterdam	Ljubomir Ljubojević	
1975		Teesside	Efim Geller	
1975		Moscow	Efim Geller	
1975		Portorož, Ljubljana	Anatoly Karpov	
1975		Milan	Anatoly Karpov	
1975		Las Palmas	Ljubomir Ljubojević	
1975		Manila	Ljubomir Ljubojević	
1975		Budapest	Zoltán Ribli; Lev Polugaevsky	
1975	USSR Chess Championship	Yerevan	Tigran Petrosian	
1976		Wijk aan Zee	Friðrik Ólafsson; Ljubomir Ljubojević	
1976	Interzonal Tournament	Biel/Bienne	Bent Larsen	
1976	Interzonal Tournament	Manila	Henrique Mecking	
1976		Manila	Eugenio Torre	
1976		Skopje	Anatoly Karpov	
1976		Sochi	Lev Polugaevsky; Evgeny Sveshnikov	
1976		Las Palmas	Efim Geller	
1976	USSR Chess Championship	Moscow	Anatoly Karpov	
1977		Leningrad	Oleg Romanishin; Mikhail Tal	
1977		Portorož, Ljubljana	Bent Larsen	
1977		Las Palmas	Anatoly Karpov	
1977	Tilburg chess tournament	Tilburg	Anatoly Karpov	
1977		Sochi	Mikhail Tal	
1977	USSR Chess Championship	Leningrad	Iossif Dorfman; Boris Gulko	
1977/78		Hastings	Roman Dzindzichashvili	
1978		Wijk aan Zee	Lajos Portisch	
1978	Lone Pine International	Lone Pine	Bent Larsen	
1978		Bugojno	Anatoly Karpov; Boris Spassky	
1978		Reykjavík	Walter Shawn Browne	
1978		Nikšić	Boris Gulko; Jan Timman	
1978		Tilburg	Lajos Portisch	
1978		Montilla, Moriles	Boris Spassky	
1978		Vilnius	Vladimir Tukmakov	
1978	USSR Chess Championship	Tbilisi	Mikhail Tal; Vitaly Tseshkovsky	
1979		Montreal	Anatoly Karpov; Mikhail Tal	
1979		Tilburg	Anatoly Karpov	
1979		Waddinxveen	Anatoly Karpov	
1979		Wijk aan Zee	Lev Polugaevsky	
1979		Bled, Portorož	Jan Timman	
1979		Munich	Boris Spassky; Yuri Balashov; Ulf Andersson; Robert Hübner	
1979	Interzonal Tournament	Riga	Mikhail Tal	
1979	Interzonal Tournament	Rio de Janeiro	Lajos Portisch; Tigran Petrosian; Robert Hübner	
1979		Tallinn	Tigran Petrosian	
1979		Lone Pine	Vladimir Liberzon; Florin Gheorghiu; Svetozar Gligorić; Vlastimil Hort	
1979		Banja Luka	Garry Kasparov	
1979		Buenos Aires	Bent Larsen	
1979	USSR Chess Championship	Minsk	Efim Geller	

=== 1980–1989 ===
Year	Tournament	Location	Winner(s)	Ref
1980		Wijk aan Zee	Yasser Seirawan; Walter Shawn Browne	
1980		Baden bei Wien	Alexander Beliavsky; Boris Spassky	
1980		Amsterdam	Anatoly Karpov	
1980		Lone Pine	Roman Dzindzichashvili	
1980		Bugojno	Anatoly Karpov	
1980		Bad Kissingen	Anatoly Karpov	
1980		Baku	Garry Kasparov	
1980	Phillips & Drew Kings	London	Tony Miles; Viktor Korchnoi; Ulf Andersson	
1980		Tilburg	Anatoly Karpov	
1980		Buenos Aires	Bent Larsen	
1980/81	USSR Chess Championship	Vilnius	Lev Psakhis; Alexander Beliavsky	
1981		Amsterdam	Jan Timman	
1981		Lone Pine	Viktor Korchnoi	
1981		Johannesburg	Ulf Andersson	
1981		Las Palmas	Jan Timman	
1981	Linares International Chess Tournament	Linares	Larry Christiansen; Anatoly Karpov	
1981		Moscow	Anatoly Karpov	
1981		Tilburg	Alexander Beliavsky	
1981	USSR Chess Championship	Moscow	Garry Kasparov; Lev Psakhis	
1982		Bugojno	Garry Kasparov	
1982	Phillips & Drew Kings	London	Ulf Andersson; Anatoly Karpov	
1982		Sochi	Mikhail Tal	
1982		Lugano	Viktor Korchnoi	
1982		Wijk aan Zee	Yuri Balashov; John Nunn	
1982		Chicago	Robert Hübner	
1982		Mar del Plata	Jan Timman	
1982		Tilburg	Anatoly Karpov	
1982		Turin	Ulf Andersson; Anatoly Karpov	
1982	Interzonal Tournament	Las Palmas	Zoltán Ribli	
1982	Interzonal Tournament	Moscow	Garry Kasparov	
1982	Interzonal Tournament	Toluca	Lajos Portisch; Eugenio Torre	
1983		Wijk aan Zee	Ulf Andersson	
1983		Indonesia	Jan Timman	
1983		Tallinn	Mikhail Tal; Rafael Vaganian	
1983		Linares	Boris Spassky	
1983		Nikšić	Garry Kasparov	
1983		Tilburg	Anatoly Karpov	
1983	USSR Chess Championship	Moscow	Anatoly Karpov	
1984		Lvov	Rafael Vaganian; Iossif Dorfman	
1984		Oslo	Anatoly Karpov	
1984		Lugano	Gyula Sax	
1984		Wijk aan Zee	Alexander Beliavsky; Viktor Korchnoi	
1984		Bugojno	Jan Timman	
1984	Phillips & Drew Kings	London	Anatoly Karpov	
1984		Sarajevo	Viktor Korchnoi; Jan Timman	
1984		Tilburg	Tony Miles	
1984/85	Reggio Emilia chess tournament	Reggio Emilia	Lajos Portisch	
1985		Amsterdam	Anatoly Karpov	
1985		Portorož, Ljubljana	Lajos Portisch; Zoltán Ribli; Tony Miles	
1985		Linares	Robert Hübner; Ljubomir Ljubojević	
1985		Lugano	Vladimir Tukmakov	
1985		Tilburg	Robert Hübner; Viktor Korchnoi; Tony Miles	
1985		Wijk aan Zee	Jan Timman	
1985		Moscow	Oleg Romanishin	
1985		Zagreb	Jan Timman	
1985		Brussels	Viktor Korchnoi	
1985		Næstved	Rafael Vaganian; Bent Larsen; Walter Shawn Browne	
1985	Interzonal Tournament	Tunis	Artur Yusupov	
1985	Interzonal Tournament	Taxco	Jan Timman	
1985	Interzonal Tournament	Biel/Bienne	Rafael Vaganian	
1985	Candidates Tournament	Montpellier	Artur Yusupov; Rafael Vaganian; Andrei Sokolov	
1985/86		Reggio Emilia	Ulf Andersson	
1986		Wijk aan Zee	Nigel Short	
1986		Brussels	Anatoly Karpov	
1986	OHRA	Brussels	Garry Kasparov	
1986		Bugojno	Anatoly Karpov	
1986		Vienna	Viktor Korchnoi; Alexander Beliavsky	
1986		Lugano	Viktor Korchnoi	
1986		Sochi	Rafael Vaganian; Alexander Beliavsky; Svetozar Gligorić	
1986		Amsterdam	Ljubomir Ljubojević	
1986		Tilburg	Alexander Beliavsky	
1986		Solingen	Robert Hübner	
1986		Sarajevo	Lajos Portisch; Lev Psakhis; Kiril Georgiev	
1986	Phillips & Drew Kings	London	Glenn Flear	
1986/87		Reggio Emilia	Zoltán Ribli	
1987		Wijk aan Zee	Viktor Korchnoi	
1987		Belgrade	Ljubomir Ljubojević	
1987		Bilbao	Anatoly Karpov	
1987		Sarajevo	Predrag Nikolić	
1987		Leningrad	Rafael Vaganian	
1987		Brussels	Garry Kasparov; Ljubomir Ljubojević	
1987		Tilburg	Jan Timman	
1987		Reykjavík	Nigel Short	
1987	Max Euwe Memorial Tournament	Amsterdam	Anatoly Karpov; Jan Timman	
1987	Interzonal Tournament	Subotica	Gyula Sax; Nigel Short; Jon Speelman	
1987	Interzonal Tournament	Szirák	Valery Salov; Jóhann Hjartarson	
1987	Interzonal Tournament	Zagreb	Viktor Korchnoi	
1987	USSR Chess Championship	Minsk	Alexander Beliavsky	
1987/88		Reggio Emilia	Vladimir Tukmakov	
1988		Wijk aan Zee	Anatoly Karpov	
1988	Optiebeurs	Amsterdam	Garry Kasparov	
1988		Amsterdam	Nigel Short	
1988	GMA World Cup	Brussels	Anatoly Karpov	
1988	GMA World Cup	Belfort	Garry Kasparov	
1988	GMA World Cup	Reykjavík	Garry Kasparov	
1988		Linares	Jan Timman	
1988		Tilburg	Anatoly Karpov	
1988	USSR Chess Championship	Moscow	Garry Kasparov; Anatoly Karpov	
1988/89		Reggio Emilia	Mikhail Gurevich	
1988/89		Hastings	Nigel Short	
1989		Wijk aan Zee	Viswanathan Anand; Predrag Nikolić; Zoltán Ribli; Gyula Sax	
1989		Amsterdam	Jan Timman	
1989	OHRA	Amsterdam	Alexander Beliavsky	
1989		Lugano	Viktor Korchnoi; Margeir Petursson	
1989		Clermont-Ferrand	Viktor Korchnoi; Olivier Renet; Sergey Dolmatov; Gyula Sax; Jaan Ehlvest	
1989	GMA World Cup	Barcelona	Garry Kasparov; Ljubomir Ljubojević	
1989	GMA World Cup	Rotterdam	Jan Timman	
1989	GMA World Cup	Skellefteå	Anatoly Karpov; Garry Kasparov	
1989		Linares	Vassily Ivanchuk	
1989		Tilburg	Garry Kasparov	
1989		Belgrade	Garry Kasparov	
1989/90		Reggio Emilia	Jaan Ehlvest	

=== 1990–1999 ===
Year	Tournament	Location	Winner(s)	Ref
1990	Hoogovens Wijk aan Zee Chess Tournament 1990	Wijk aan Zee	John Nunn	
1990		Linares	Garry Kasparov	
1990		Amsterdam	Alexander Beliavsky	
1990		Haninge	Yasser Seirawan	
1990		Rotterdam	Viktor Korchnoi	
1990		Prague	Jan Timman	
1990		Tilburg	Vassily Ivanchuk; Gata Kamsky	
1990		Pamplona	Viktor Korchnoi	
1990	Interzonal Tournament	Manila	Boris Gelfand; Vassily Ivanchuk	
1990	USSR Chess Championship	Leningrad	Alexander Beliavsky; Leonid Yudasin; Evgeny Bareev; Alexey Vyzmanavin	
1990/91		Reggio Emilia	Anatoly Karpov	
1991	Hoogovens Wijk aan Zee Chess Tournament 1991	Wijk aan Zee	John Nunn	
1991		Amsterdam	Valery Salov; Nigel Short	
1991		Harlingen	Viktor Korchnoi	
1991		Linares	Vassily Ivanchuk	
1991		Munich	Larry Christiansen	
1991		Belgrade	Boris Gelfand	
1991		Reykjavík	Vassily Ivanchuk; Anatoly Karpov	
1991		Terrassa	Michael Adams; Jaan Ehlvest	
1991		Tilburg	Garry Kasparov	
1991		Bled, Rogaska Slatina	Predrag Nikolić	
1991/92		Reggio Emilia	Viswanathan Anand	
1992	Hoogovens Wijk aan Zee Chess Tournament 1992	Wijk aan Zee	Boris Gelfand; Valery Salov	
1992	Biel Chess Festival	Biel/Bienne	Anatoly Karpov	
1992		Amsterdam	Nigel Short; Viswanathan Anand	
1992	Dortmund Sparkassen Chess Meeting	Dortmund	Vassily Ivanchuk; Garry Kasparov	
1992		Linares	Garry Kasparov	
1992		Madrid	Anatoly Karpov	
1992		Moscow	Viswanathan Anand; Boris Gelfand	
1992		Tilburg	Michael Adams	
1992		Baden-Baden	Anatoly Karpov	
1993	Hoogovens Wijk aan Zee Chess Tournament 1993	Wijk aan Zee	Anatoly Karpov	
1993		Amsterdam	Viswanathan Anand; Vladimir Kramnik; Nigel Short	
1993		Dortmund	Anatoly Karpov	
1993		Linares	Garry Kasparov	
1993		Chalkidiki	Boris Gelfand	
1993		Las Palmas	Ivan Morovic Fernandez	
1993		Munich	Alexei Shirov	
1993		Madrid	Viswanathan Anand; Vladimir Kramnik; Veselin Topalov	
1993	Interzonal Tournament	Biel/Bienne	Boris Gelfand	
1993	PCA Candidates Qualifier	Groningen	Michael Adams; Viswanathan Anand	
1993		Tilburg	Anatoly Karpov	
1994		Amsterdam	Garry Kasparov	
1994		Las Palmas	Gata Kamsky	
1994		Dortmund	Jeroen Piket	
1994		Horgen	Garry Kasparov	
1994		Linares	Anatoly Karpov	
1994		Munich	Vassily Ivanchuk	
1994		Madrid	Judit Polgár	
1994		Dos Hermanas	Boris Gelfand	
1994		Veliky Novgorod	Vassily Ivanchuk; Garry Kasparov	
1994		Tilburg	Valery Salov	
1995	Hoogovens Wijk aan Zee Chess Tournament 1995	Wijk aan Zee	Alexey Dreev	
1995		Dortmund	Vladimir Kramnik	
1995		León	Alexei Shirov; Evgeny Bareev	
1995		Madrid	Viktor Korchnoi	
1995		Belgrade	Vladimir Kramnik; Boris Gelfand	
1995		Dos Hermanas	Michael Adams; Gata Kamsky; Anatoly Karpov	
1995		Amsterdam	Joël Lautier	
1995	Donner Memorial	Amsterdam	Jan Timman; Julio Granda	
1995		Linares	Vassily Ivanchuk	
1995		Veliky Novgorod	Garry Kasparov	
1995		Riga	Garry Kasparov	
1995		Biel/Bienne	Alexey Dreev	
1995		Horgen	Vassily Ivanchuk; Vladimir Kramnik	
1995		Groningen	Anatoly Karpov	
1995	Russian Chess Championship	Elista	Peter Svidler	
1996	Hoogovens Wijk aan Zee Chess Tournament 1996	Wijk aan Zee	Vassily Ivanchuk	
1996		Amsterdam	Garry Kasparov; Veselin Topalov	
1996		Dortmund	Viswanathan Anand; Vladimir Kramnik	
1996		Dos Hermanas	Vladimir Kramnik; Veselin Topalov	
1996		Las Palmas	Garry Kasparov	
1996	Donner Memorial	Amsterdam	Julio Granda; Vassily Ivanchuk	
1996		Groningen	Nigel Short	
1996		Belgrade	Evgeny Bareev	
1996		Belgrade, Stara Pazova	Anatoly Karpov	
1996		León	Judit Polgár; Veselin Topalov	
1996		Madrid	Miguel Illescas Córdoba; Veselin Topalov	
1996		Veliky Novgorod	Veselin Topalov	
1996		Vienna	Boris Gelfand; Anatoly Karpov; Veselin Topalov	
1996	Russian Chess Championship	Elista	Alexander Khalifman	
1996		Tilburg	Jeroen Piket; Boris Gelfand	
1997		Wijk aan Zee	Valery Salov	
1997		Belgrade	Viswanathan Anand; Vassily Ivanchuk	
1997		Biel/Bienne	Viswanathan Anand	
1997		Dortmund	Vladimir Kramnik	
1997		Dos Hermanas	Viswanathan Anand; Vladimir Kramnik	
1997		Linares	Garry Kasparov	
1997		Madrid	Alexei Shirov; Veselin Topalov	
1997		Polanica-Zdrój	Sergei Rublevsky	
1997		Veliky Novgorod	Garry Kasparov	
1997		Tilburg	Garry Kasparov; Vladimir Kramnik; Peter Svidler	
1997	Russian Chess Championship	Elista	Peter Svidler	
1997	FIDE Knockout Championship	Groningen	Viswanathan Anand	
1998		Wijk aan Zee	Viswanathan Anand; Vladimir Kramnik	
1998		Dortmund	Michael Adams; Vladimir Kramnik; Peter Svidler	
1998		Linares	Viswanathan Anand	
1998		Madrid	Viswanathan Anand	
1998		Polanica-Zdrój	Boris Gelfand	
1998		Elista	Vassily Ivanchuk	
1998		Tilburg	Viswanathan Anand	
1998	Russian Chess Championship	Saint Petersburg	Alexander Morozevich	
1999		Wijk aan Zee	Garry Kasparov	
1999		Dortmund	Peter Leko	
1999		Dos Hermanas	Michael Adams	
1999		Linares	Garry Kasparov	
1999		Sarajevo	Garry Kasparov	
1999	FIDE Knockout Championship	Las Vegas	Alexander Khalifman	

=== 2000–2009 ===
Year	Tournament	Location	Winner(s)	Ref
2000	Corus Chess Tournament (A)	(Netherlands) Wijk aan Zee	Garry Kasparov	
2000	Internationale Dortmunder Schachtage	(Germany) Dortmund	Viswanathan Anand; Vladimir Kramnik	
2000	Linares International Chess Tournament	(Spain) Linares	Garry Kasparov; Vladimir Kramnik	
2000	Montecatini Terme	(Italy) Montecatini Terme	Vassily Ivanchuk	
2000	Rubinstein Memorial	(Poland) Polanica-Zdrój	Boris Gelfand	
2000	Chess World Cup	(China) Shenyang	Viswanathan Anand	
2000	Sarajevo Bosnia	(Bosnia and Herzegovina) Sarajevo	Garry Kasparov	
2000	FIDE Knockout Championship	(India) New Delhi (Iran) Tehran	Viswanathan Anand	
2001	Corus Chess Tournament (A)	(Netherlands) Wijk aan Zee	Garry Kasparov	
2001	Astana Chess Tournament	(Kazakhstan) Astana	Garry Kasparov	
2001	Internationale Dortmunder Schachtage	(Germany) Dortmund	Vladimir Kramnik; Veselin Topalov	
2001	Biel Chess Festival	(Switzerland) Biel/Bienne	Viktor Korchnoi	
2001	Linares International Chess Tournament	(Spain) Linares	Garry Kasparov	
2001/02	FIDE Knockout Championship	(Russia) Moscow	Ruslan Ponomariov	
2002	Cannes Chess Open	(France) Cannes	Boris Gelfand; Veselin Topalov	
2002	Corus Chess Tournament (A)	(Netherlands) Wijk aan Zee	Evgeny Bareev	
2002	Linares International Chess Tournament	(Spain) Linares	Garry Kasparov	
2002	Candidates Tournament	(Germany) Dortmund	Peter Leko	
2002	Chess World Cup	(India) Hyderabad	Viswanathan Anand	
2003	Corus Chess Tournament (A)	(Netherlands) Wijk aan Zee	Viswanathan Anand	
2003	Budapest Hunguest Hotels	(Hungary) Budapest	Nigel Short	
2003	Internationale Dortmunder Schachtage	(Germany) Dortmund	Viktor Bologan	
2003	Enghien-les-Bains	(France) Enghien-les-Bains	Evgeny Bareev	
2003	Hrokurinn tournament	(Iceland) Reykjavík	Alexei Shirov	
2003	Linares International Chess Tournament	(Spain) Linares	Vladimir Kramnik; Peter Leko	
2003	Russian Chess Championship	(Russia) Krasnoyarsk	Peter Svidler	
2004	Corus Chess Tournament (A)	(Netherlands) Wijk aan Zee	Viswanathan Anand	
2004	Internationale Dortmunder Schachtage	(Germany) Dortmund	Viswanathan Anand	
2004	Biel Chess Festival	(Switzerland) Biel/Bienne	Alexander Morozevich	
2004	Linares International Chess Tournament	(Spain) Linares	Vladimir Kramnik	
2004	FIDE Knockout Championship	(Libya) Tripoli	Rustam Kasimdzhanov	
2004	Russian Chess Championship	(Russia) Moscow	Garry Kasparov	
2005	Corus Chess Tournament (A)	(Netherlands) Wijk aan Zee	Peter Leko	
2005	Internationale Dortmunder Schachtage	(Germany) Dortmund	Arkadij Naiditsch	
2005	Linares International Chess Tournament	(Spain) Linares	Garry Kasparov; Veselin Topalov	
2005	M-Tel Masters	(Bulgaria) Sofia	Veselin Topalov	
2005	Chess World Cup	(Russia) Khanty-Mansiysk	Levon Aronian	
2005	FIDE World Championship	(Argentina) San Luis	Veselin Topalov	
2005	Russian Chess Championship	(Russia) Moscow	Sergei Rublevsky	
2006	Corus Chess Tournament (A)	(Netherlands) Wijk aan Zee	Viswanathan Anand; Veselin Topalov	
2006	Internationale Dortmunder Schachtage	(Germany) Dortmund	Vladimir Kramnik; Peter Svidler	
2006	Biel Chess Festival	(Switzerland) Biel/Bienne	Alexander Morozevich	
2006	Aerosvit chess tournament	(Ukraine) Foros	Sergei Rublevsky	
2006	Linares International Chess Tournament	(Spain) Morelia, Linares	Levon Aronian	
2006	Tal Memorial	(Russia) Moscow	Levon Aronian; Peter Leko; Ruslan Ponomariov	
2006	M-Tel Masters	(Bulgaria) Sofia	Veselin Topalov	
2007	Corus Chess Tournament (A)	(Netherlands) Wijk aan Zee	Levon Aronian; Teimour Radjabov; Veselin Topalov	
2007	Linares International Chess Tournament	(Spain) Morelia, Linares	Viswanathan Anand	
2007	M-Tel Masters	(Bulgaria) Sofia	Veselin Topalov	
2007	Internationale Dortmunder Schachtage	(Germany) Dortmund	Vladimir Kramnik	
2007	Aerosvit chess tournament	(Ukraine) Foros	Vassily Ivanchuk	
2007	Biel Chess Festival	(Switzerland) Biel/Bienne	Magnus Carlsen	
2007	Chess World Cup	(Russia) Khanty-Mansiysk	Gata Kamsky	
2007	Tal Memorial	(Russia) Moscow	Vladimir Kramnik	
2007	World Chess Championship 2007	Mexico City	Viswanathan Anand	
2007	Russian Chess Championship	(Russia) Moscow	Alexander Morozevich	
2008	Corus Chess Tournament (A)	(Netherlands) Wijk aan Zee	Levon Aronian; Magnus Carlsen	
2008	Linares International Chess Tournament	(Spain) Morelia, Linares	Viswanathan Anand	
2008	Grand Prix 2008–2010	(Azerbaijan) Baku	Vugar Gashimov; Wang Yue; Magnus Carlsen	
2008	Grand Prix 2008–2010	(Russia) Sochi	Levon Aronian	
2008	Grand Prix 2008–2010	(Russia) Elista	Teimour Radjabov; Dmitry Jakovenko; Alexander Grischuk	
2008	M-Tel Masters	(Bulgaria) Sofia	Vassily Ivanchuk	
2008	Aerosvit chess tournament	(Ukraine) Foros	Magnus Carlsen	
2008	Internationale Dortmunder Schachtage	(Germany) Dortmund	Peter Leko	
2008	Karen Asrian Memorial	(Armenia) Yerevan	Levon Aronian	
2008	Tal Memorial	(Russia) Moscow	Vassily Ivanchuk	
2008	Bilbao Chess Masters Final	(Spain) Bilbao	Veselin Topalov	
2008	Pearl Spring Chess Tournament	(China) Nanjing	Veselin Topalov	
2008	Russian Chess Championship	(Russia) Moscow	Peter Svidler	
2009	Corus Chess Tournament (A)	(Netherlands) Wijk aan Zee	Sergey Karjakin	
2009	Linares International Chess Tournament	(Spain) Linares	Alexander Grischuk; Vassily Ivanchuk	
2009	Grand Prix 2008–2010	(Russia) Nalchik	Levon Aronian	
2009	Grand Prix 2008–2010	(Armenia) Jermuk	Vassily Ivanchuk	
2009	M-Tel Masters	(Bulgaria) Sofia	Alexei Shirov	
2009	Kings Tournament	(Romania) Bazna	Vassily Ivanchuk	
2009	Internationale Dortmunder Schachtage	(Germany) Dortmund	Vladimir Kramnik	
2009	Biel Chess Festival	(Switzerland) Biel/Bienne	Maxime Vachier-Lagrave	
2009	Bilbao Chess Masters Final	(Spain) Bilbao	Levon Aronian	
2009	Pearl Spring Chess Tournament	(China) Nanjing	Magnus Carlsen	
2009	Tal Memorial	(Russia) Moscow	Vladimir Kramnik	
2009	Chess World Cup	(Russia) Khanty-Mansiysk	Boris Gelfand	
2009	London Chess Classic	(United Kingdom) London	Magnus Carlsen	
2009	Russian Chess Championship	(Russia) Moscow	Alexander Grischuk	

=== 2010–2019 ===
Year	Tournament	Location	Winner(s)	Ref
2010	Corus Chess Tournament (A)	(Netherlands) Wijk aan Zee	Magnus Carlsen	
2010	Linares International Chess Tournament	(Spain) Linares	Veselin Topalov	
2010	Grand Prix 2008–2010	(Russia) Astrakhan	Pavel Eljanov	
2010	Kings Tournament	(Romania) Mediaș	Magnus Carlsen	
2010	Internationale Dortmunder Schachtage	(Germany) Dortmund	Ruslan Ponomariov	
2010	Shanghai Masters	(China) Shanghai	Alexei Shirov	
2010	Bilbao Chess Masters Final	(Spain) Bilbao	Vladimir Kramnik	
2010	Pearl Spring Chess Tournament	(China) Nanjing	Magnus Carlsen	
2010	Tal Memorial	(Russia) Moscow	Levon Aronian; Sergey Karjakin; Shakhriyar Mamedyarov	
2010	London Chess Classic	(United Kingdom) London	Magnus Carlsen	
2010	Russian Chess Championship	(Russia) Moscow	Ian Nepomniachtchi	
2010/11	Reggio Emilia chess tournament	(Italy) Reggio Emilia	Vugar Gashimov	
2011	Tata Steel Masters	(Netherlands) Wijk aan Zee	Hikaru Nakamura	
2011	Kings Tournament	(Romania) Mediaș	Magnus Carlsen; Sergey Karjakin	
2011	Internationale Dortmunder Schachtage	(Germany) Dortmund	Vladimir Kramnik	
2011	Biel Chess Festival	(Switzerland) Biel/Bienne	Magnus Carlsen	
2011	Chess World Cup	(Russia) Khanty-Mansiysk	Peter Svidler	
2011	Bilbao Chess Masters Final	(Brazil) São Paulo (Spain) Bilbao	Magnus Carlsen	
2011	Tal Memorial	(Russia) Moscow	Levon Aronian; Magnus Carlsen	
2011	London Chess Classic	(United Kingdom) London	Vladimir Kramnik	
2011	Russian Chess Championship	(Russia) Moscow	Peter Svidler	
2011/12	Reggio Emilia chess tournament	(Italy) Reggio Emilia	Anish Giri	
2012	Tata Steel Masters	(Netherlands) Wijk aan Zee	Levon Aronian	
2012	Tal Memorial	(Russia) Moscow	Magnus Carlsen	
2012	Internationale Dortmunder Schachtage	(Germany) Dortmund	Fabiano Caruana; Sergey Karjakin	
2012	Biel Chess Festival	(Switzerland) Biel/Bienne	Wang Hao	
2012	Grand Prix 2012–2013	(United Kingdom) London	Veselin Topalov; Boris Gelfand; Shakhriyar Mamedyarov	
2012	Grand Prix 2012–2013	(Uzbekistan) Tashkent	Sergey Karjakin; Wang Hao; Alexander Morozevich	
2012	Bilbao Chess Masters Final	(Brazil) São Paulo (Spain) Bilbao	Magnus Carlsen	
2012	Kings Tournament	(Romania) Bucharest	Vassily Ivanchuk	
2012	London Chess Classic	(United Kingdom) London	Magnus Carlsen	
2012	Russian Chess Championship	(Russia) Moscow	Dmitry Andreikin	
2013	Tata Steel Masters	(Netherlands) Wijk aan Zee	Magnus Carlsen	
2013	Grenke Chess Classic	(Germany) Baden-Baden	Viswanathan Anand	
2013	Grand Prix 2012–2013	(Switzerland) Zug	Veselin Topalov	
2013	Grand Prix 2012–2013	(Greece) Thessaloniki	Leinier Domínguez Pérez	
2013	Grand Prix 2012–2013	(China) Beijing	Shakhriyar Mamedyarov	
2013	Grand Prix 2012–2013	(France) Paris	Fabiano Caruana; Boris Gelfand	
2013	Zurich Chess Challenge	(Switzerland) Zurich	Fabiano Caruana	
2013	Alekhine Memorial	(France) Paris (Russia) Saint Petersburg	Levon Aronian	
2013	Tal Memorial	(Russia) Moscow	Boris Gelfand	
2013	Internationale Dortmunder Schachtage	(Germany) Dortmund	Michael Adams	
2013	Candidates Tournament	(United Kingdom) London	Magnus Carlsen	
2013	Norway Chess	(Norway) Stavanger	Sergey Karjakin	
2013	Chess World Cup	(Norway) Tromsø	Vladimir Kramnik	
2013	Sinquefield Cup	(United States) St. Louis	Magnus Carlsen	
2013	Bilbao Chess Masters Final	(Spain) Bilbao	Levon Aronian	
2013	Kings Tournament	(Romania) Bucharest	Fabiano Caruana	
2013	Russian Chess Championship	(Russia) Nizhny Novgorod	Peter Svidler	
2014	Tata Steel Masters	(Netherlands) Wijk aan Zee	Levon Aronian	
2014	Zurich Chess Challenge	(Switzerland) Zurich	Magnus Carlsen	
2014	Candidates Tournament	(Russia) Khanty-Mansiysk	Viswanathan Anand	
2014	Shamkir Chess	(Azerbaijan) Shamkir	Magnus Carlsen	
2014	Norway Chess	(Norway) Stavanger	Sergey Karjakin	
2014	Biel Chess Festival	(Switzerland) Biel/Bienne	Maxime Vachier-Lagrave	
2014	Internationale Dortmunder Schachtage	(Germany) Dortmund	Fabiano Caruana	
2014	Sinquefield Cup	(United States) St. Louis	Fabiano Caruana	
2014	Grand Prix 2014–2015	(Azerbaijan) Baku	Fabiano Caruana; Boris Gelfand	
2014	Grand Prix 2014–2015	(Uzbekistan) Tashkent	Dmitry Andreikin	
2014	Bilbao Chess Masters Final	(Spain) Bilbao	Viswanathan Anand	
2014	Tal Memorial	(Russia) Moscow	Alexander Grischuk	
2014	London Chess Classic	(United Kingdom) London	Viswanathan Anand; Vladimir Kramnik; Anish Giri	
2014	Qatar Masters Open	(Qatar) Doha	Yu Yangyi	
2014	Russian Chess Championship	(Russia) Kazan	Igor Lysyj	
2015	Tata Steel Masters	(Netherlands) Wijk aan Zee	Magnus Carlsen	
2015	Grenke Chess Classic	(Germany) Baden-Baden	Magnus Carlsen	
2015	Zurich Chess Challenge	(Switzerland) Zurich	Hikaru Nakamura	
2015	Grand Prix 2014–2015	(Georgia (country)) Tbilisi	Evgeny Tomashevsky	
2015	Grand Prix 2014–2015	(Russia) Khanty-Mansiysk	Dmitry Jakovenko; Fabiano Caruana; Hikaru Nakamura	
2015	Shamkir Chess	(Azerbaijan) Shamkir	Magnus Carlsen	
2015	Norway Chess	(Norway) Stavanger	Veselin Topalov	
2015	Grand Chess Tour	(United Kingdom) London	Magnus Carlsen	
2015	Grand Chess Tour	(United States) St. Louis	Levon Aronian	
2015	Internationale Dortmunder Schachtage	(Germany) Dortmund	Fabiano Caruana	
2015	Chess World Cup	(Azerbaijan) Baku	Sergey Karjakin	
2015	Bilbao Chess Masters Final	(Spain) Bilbao	Wesley So	
2015	Qatar Masters Open	(Qatar) Doha	Magnus Carlsen	
2015	Russian Chess Championship	(Russia) Chita	Evgeny Tomashevsky	
2016	Tata Steel Masters	(Netherlands) Wijk aan Zee	Magnus Carlsen	
2016	Candidates Tournament	(Russia) Moscow	Sergey Karjakin	
2016	Norway Chess	(Norway) Stavanger	Magnus Carlsen	
2016	Shamkir Chess	(Azerbaijan) Shamkir	Shakhriyar Mamedyarov	
2016	U.S. Chess Championship	(United States) St. Louis	Fabiano Caruana	
2016	Hainan Danzhou GMs	(China) Danzhou	Ian Nepomniachtchi	
2016	Internationale Dortmunder Schachtage	(Germany) Dortmund	Maxime Vachier-Lagrave	
2016	Bilbao Chess Masters Final	(Spain) Bilbao	Magnus Carlsen	
2016	Grand Chess Tour	(United States) St. Louis	Wesley So	
2016	Grand Chess Tour	(United Kingdom) London	Wesley So	
2016	Tal Memorial	(Russia) Moscow	Ian Nepomniachtchi	
2017	Tata Steel Masters	(Netherlands) Wijk aan Zee	Wesley So	
2017	Shenzhen Masters	(China) Shenzhen	Ding Liren	
2017	Grand Prix 2017	(United Arab Emirates) Sharjah	Alexander Grischuk; Shakhriyar Mamedyarov; Maxime Vachier-Lagrave	
2017	Grand Prix 2017	(Russia) Moscow	Ding Liren	
2017	Grand Prix 2017	(Switzerland) Geneva	Teimour Radjabov	
2017	Grand Prix 2017	(Spain) Palma de Mallorca	Levon Aronian; Dmitry Jakovenko	
2017	Shamkir Chess	(Azerbaijan) Shamkir	Shakhriyar Mamedyarov	
2017	U.S. Chess Championship	(United States) St. Louis	Wesley So	
2017	Grenke Chess Classic	(Germany) Karlsruhe, Baden-Baden	Levon Aronian	
2017	Norway Chess	(Norway) Stavanger	Levon Aronian	
2017	Hainan Danzhou GMs	(China) Danzhou	Wei Yi	
2017	Internationale Dortmunder Schachtage	(Germany) Dortmund	Radosław Wojtaszek	
2017	Chess World Cup	(Georgia (country)) Tbilisi	Levon Aronian	
2017	Grand Chess Tour	(United States) St. Louis	Maxime Vachier-Lagrave	
2017	Grand Chess Tour	(United Kingdom) London	Fabiano Caruana	
2018	Tata Steel Masters	(Netherlands) Wijk aan Zee	Magnus Carlsen	
2018	Candidates Tournament	(Germany) Berlin	Fabiano Caruana	
2018	Grenke Chess Classic	(Germany) Karlsruhe, Baden-Baden	Fabiano Caruana	
2018	Shamkir Chess	(Azerbaijan) Shamkir	Magnus Carlsen	
2018	U.S. Chess Championship	(United States) St. Louis	Samuel Shankland	
2018	Norway Chess	(Norway) Stavanger	Fabiano Caruana	
2018	Hainan Danzhou GMs	(China) Danzhou	Yu Yangyi	
2018	Internationale Dortmunder Schachtage	(Germany) Dortmund	Ian Nepomniachtchi	
2018	Biel Chess Festival	(Switzerland) Biel/Bienne	Shakhriyar Mamedyarov	
2018	Grand Chess Tour	(United States) St. Louis	Magnus Carlsen; Levon Aronian; Fabiano Caruana	
2018	Grand Chess Tour	(United Kingdom) London	Hikaru Nakamura	
2018	Shenzhen Masters	(China) Shenzhen	Maxime Vachier-Lagrave; Ding Liren; Anish Giri	
2019	Tata Steel Masters	(Netherlands) Wijk aan Zee	Magnus Carlsen	
2019	Prague Masters	(Czech Republic) Prague	Nikita Vitiugov	
2019	Shamkir Chess	(Azerbaijan) Shamkir	Magnus Carlsen	
2019	Shenzhen Masters	(China) Shenzhen	Anish Giri	
2019	Grenke Chess Classic	(Germany) Karlsruhe, Baden-Baden	Magnus Carlsen	
2019	U.S. Chess Championship	(United States) St. Louis	Hikaru Nakamura	
2019	Grand Prix 2019	(Russia) Moscow	Ian Nepomniachtchi	
2019	Grand Prix 2019	(Israel) Jerusalem	Ian Nepomniachtchi	
2019	Grand Prix 2019	(Latvia) Riga	Shakhriyar Mamedyarov	
2019	Grand Prix 2019	(Germany) Hamburg	Alexander Grischuk	
2019	Norway Chess	(Norway) Stavanger	Magnus Carlsen	
2019	Grand Chess Tour	(Croatia) Zagreb	Magnus Carlsen	
2019	Grand Chess Tour	(United States) St. Louis	Ding Liren	
2019	Grand Chess Tour	(United Kingdom) London	Ding Liren	
2019	Hainan Danzhou GMs	(China) Danzhou	Richárd Rapport	
2019	Internationale Dortmunder Schachtage	(Germany) Dortmund	Leinier Domínguez Pérez	
2019	Chess World Cup	(Russia) Khanty-Mansiysk	Teimour Radjabov	
2019	Grand Swiss	Isle of Man	Wang Hao	

=== 2020–2029 ===
Year	Tournament	Location	Winner(s)	Ref
2020	Tata Steel Masters	(Netherlands) Wijk aan Zee	Fabiano Caruana	
2020	Prague Masters	(Czech Republic) Prague	Alireza Firouzja	
2020	Norway Chess	(Norway) Stavanger	Magnus Carlsen	
2020	Russian Chess Championship	(Russia) Moscow	Ian Nepomniachtchi	
2020/21	Candidates Tournament	(Russia) Yekaterinburg	Ian Nepomniachtchi	
2021	Tata Steel Masters	(Netherlands) Wijk aan Zee	Jorden van Foreest	
2021	Superbet Chess Classic Romania	(Romania) Bucharest	Shakhriyar Mamedyarov	
2021	Chess World Cup	(Russia) Sochi	Jan-Krzysztof Duda	
2021	Russian Chess Championship	(Russia) Ufa	Nikita Vitiugov	
2021	Sinquefield Cup	(United States) St. Louis	Maxime Vachier-Lagrave	
2021	Norway Chess	(Norway) Stavanger	Magnus Carlsen	
2021	U.S. Chess Championship	(United States) St. Louis	Wesley So	
2021	Grand Swiss	(Latvia) Riga	Alireza Firouzja	
2022	Tata Steel Masters	(Netherlands) Wijk aan Zee	Magnus Carlsen	
2022	Grand Prix 2022	(Germany) Berlin	Hikaru Nakamura	
2022	Grand Prix 2022	(Serbia) Belgrade	Richárd Rapport	
2022	Grand Prix 2022	(Germany) Berlin	Wesley So	
2022	American Cup	(United States) St. Louis	Fabiano Caruana	
2022	Superbet Chess Classic Romania	(Romania) Bucharest	Maxime Vachier-Lagrave	
2022	Norway Chess	(Norway) Stavanger	Magnus Carlsen	
2022	Candidates Tournament	(Spain) Madrid	Ian Nepomniachtchi	
2022	Sinquefield Cup	(United States) St. Louis	Alireza Firouzja	
2022	U.S. Chess Championship	(United States) St. Louis	Fabiano Caruana	
2023	Tata Steel Masters	(Netherlands) Wijk aan Zee	Anish Giri	
2023	WR Chess Masters 2023	(Germany) Düsseldorf	Levon Aronian	
2023	American Cup	(United States) St. Louis	Hikaru Nakamura	
2023	Superbet Chess Classic Romania	(Romania) Bucharest	Fabiano Caruana	
2023	Norway Chess	(Norway) Stavanger	Hikaru Nakamura	
2023	Chess World Cup	(Azerbaijan) Baku	Magnus Carlsen	
2023	Qatar Masters Open	(Qatar) Doha	Nodirbek Yakubboev	
2023	Grand Swiss	Isle of Man	Vidit Gujrathi	
2023	Sinquefield Cup	(United States) St. Louis	Fabiano Caruana	
2023	U.S. Chess Championship	(United States) St. Louis	Fabiano Caruana	
2023	Chennai Grand Masters	(India) Chennai	Gukesh D	
2024	Tata Steel Masters	(Netherlands) Wijk aan Zee	Wei Yi	
2024	Prague Masters	(Czech Republic) Prague	Nodirbek Abdusattorov	
2024	Shenzhen Masters	(China) Shenzhen	Bu Xiangzhi	
2024	American Cup	(United States) St. Louis	Levon Aronian	
2024	Grenke Chess Classic	(Germany) Karlsruhe, Baden-Baden	Magnus Carlsen	
2024	Candidates Tournament	(Canada) Toronto	Gukesh D	
2024	Norway Chess	(Norway) Stavanger	Magnus Carlsen	
2024	UzChess Cup	(Uzbekistan) Tashkent	Nodirbek Yakubboev	
2024	Superbet Chess Classic Romania	(Romania) Bucharest	Fabiano Caruana	
2024	Sinquefield Cup	(United States) St. Louis	Alireza Firouzja	
2024	U.S. Chess Championship	(United States) St. Louis	Fabiano Caruana	
2024	WR Chess Masters 2024	(United Kingdom) London	Arjun Erigaisi	
2024	Chennai Grand Masters	(India) Chennai	Aravindh Chithambaram	
2025	Tata Steel Masters	(Netherlands) Wijk aan Zee	R Praggnanandhaa	
2025	Prague Masters	(Czech Republic) Prague	Aravindh Chithambaram	
2025	American Cup	(United States) St. Louis	Hikaru Nakamura	
2025	Superbet Chess Classic Romania	(Romania) Bucharest	R Praggnanandhaa	
2025	Norway Chess	(Norway) Stavanger	Magnus Carlsen	
2025	UzChess Cup	(Uzbekistan) Tashkent	R Praggnanandhaa	
2025	Chennai Grand Masters	(India) Chennai	Vincent Keymer	
2025	Sinquefield Cup	(United States) St. Louis	Wesley So	
2025	Grand Swiss	(Uzbekistan) Samarkand	Anish Giri	
2025	Grand Chess Tour Finals	(Brazil) São Paulo	Fabiano Caruana	
2025	U.S. Chess Championship	(United States) St. Louis	Fabiano Caruana	
2025	Chess World Cup	(India) Goa	Javokhir Sindarov	
2026	Tata Steel Masters	(Netherlands) Wijk aan Zee	Nodirbek Abdusattorov	
2026	Prague Masters	(Czech Republic) Prague	Nodirbek Abdusattorov	
2026	American Cup	(United States) St. Louis	Wesley So	
2026	Candidates Tournament	(Cyprus) Pegeia	Javokhir Sindarov	
2026	TePe Sigeman	(Sweden) Malmö	Magnus Carlsen	
2026	Super Chess Classic Romania	(Romania) Bucharest	Vincent Keymer	
2026	Norway Chess	(Norway) Oslo	R Praggnanandhaa	
2026	UzChess Cup	(Uzbekistan) Tashkent	Mukhiddin Madaminov	
2026	Chennai Grand Masters	(India) Chennai	Alireza Firouzja	
2026	Sinquefield Cup	(United States) St. Louis	Wesley So	
2026	Grand Chess Tour Finals	(United States) St. Louis	R Praggnanandhaa	
2026	U.S. Chess Championship	(United States) St. Louis	Wesley So	

== Individual tournaments ==
- AVRO 1938 chess tournament
- Baden-Baden 1870 chess tournament
- Berlin 1881 chess tournament
- Berlin 1897 chess tournament
- Bled 1931 chess tournament
- Buenos Aires 1939 chess tournament
- Cambridge Springs 1904 chess tournament
- Carlsbad 1907 chess tournament Carlsbad
- Carlsbad 1911 chess tournamentCarlsbad
- Carlsbad 1923 chess tournamentCarlsbad
- Carlsbad 1929 chess tournamentCarlsbad
- Dallas 1957 chess tournament
- Groningen 1946 chess tournament
- Hamburg 1910 chess tournament
- Hastings 1895 chess tournament
- Kemeri 1937 chess tournament
- London 1851 chess tournament
- London 1862 chess tournament
- London 1883 chess tournament
- London 1899 chess tournament
- Mannheim 1914 chess tournament
- Mar del Plata 1941 chess tournament
- Montevideo 1938 chess tournament
- Moravská Ostrava 1923 chess tournament
- Moscow 1925 chess tournament
- Munich 1941 chess tournament
- New York 1924 chess tournament
- New York 1927 chess tournament
- New York 1931 chess tournament
- Nottingham 1936 chess tournament
- Nuremberg 1896 chess tournament
- Ostend 1907 chess tournament
- Paris 1867 chess tournament
- Paris 1878 chess tournament
- Paris 1900 chess tournament
- Prague 1908 chess tournament
- Salzburg 1942 chess tournament
- San Antonio 1972 chess tournament
- San Remo 1930 chess tournament
- St. Petersburg 1914 chess tournament
- Vienna 1873 chess tournament
- Vienna 1882 chess tournament
- Vienna 1898 chess tournament
- Vienna 1908 chess tournament
- Zurich 1934 chess tournament
- Zurich 1953 chess tournament

== Major recurring tournaments ==
- Aerosvit chess tournament
- American Chess Congress
- Berlin City Chess Championship
- Biel International Chess Festival
- Grand Slam Masters Final
- British Chess Congress
- Capablanca Memorial
- Chennai Grand Masters
- Chigorin Memorial
- Dortmund Sparkassen Chess Meeting
- DSB Congress
- Euwe Memorial
- General Government chess tournament
- Gibraltar Chess Festival
- Hastings International Chess Congress
- IBM international chess tournament
- Keres Memorial
- Konex chess tournament
- Leningrad City Chess Championship
- Leopold Trebitsch Memorial Tournament
- Linares chess tournament
- London Chess Classic
- Lone Pine International
- Lublin Grandmaster Tournament
- Mar del Plata chess tournament
- Monte Carlo chess tournament
- Moscow City Chess Championship
- M-Tel Masters
- Netanya chess tournament
- North Sea Cup
- Norway Chess
- Paris City Chess Championship
- Pearl Spring chess tournament
- Phillips & Drew Kings
- Qatar Masters Open
- Reggio Emilia chess tournament
- Rubinstein Memorial
- San Sebastián chess tournament
- Shamkir Chess
- Shenzhen Masters
- Schlechter Memorial
- Silesian Chess Congress
- Sinquefield Cup
- Staunton Memorial
- Tal Memorial
- Tata Steel Chess Tournament
- Tilburg chess tournament
- Torre Memorial
- Trebitsch Memorial
- Triberg chess tournament
- US Chess Championship
- UzChess Cup
- Vidmar Memorial
- Vlissingen chess tournament
- World Open chess tournament
- Xtracon Chess Open
- Zurich Chess Challenge

== World Cup ==
- Chess World Cup 1988–1989
- Chess World Cup 2000
- Chess World Cup 2002
- Chess World Cup 2005
- Chess World Cup 2007
- Chess World Cup 2009
- Chess World Cup 2011
- Chess World Cup 2013
- Chess World Cup 2015
- Chess World Cup 2017
- Chess World Cup 2019
- Chess World Cup 2021
- Chess World Cup 2023
- Chess World Cup 2025

== See also ==
- List of mini chess tournaments
- Chess Olympiad
- European Individual Chess Championship
- EU Individual Open Chess Championship
