= IBM international chess tournament =

1961–1981 event in Amsterdam, Netherlands

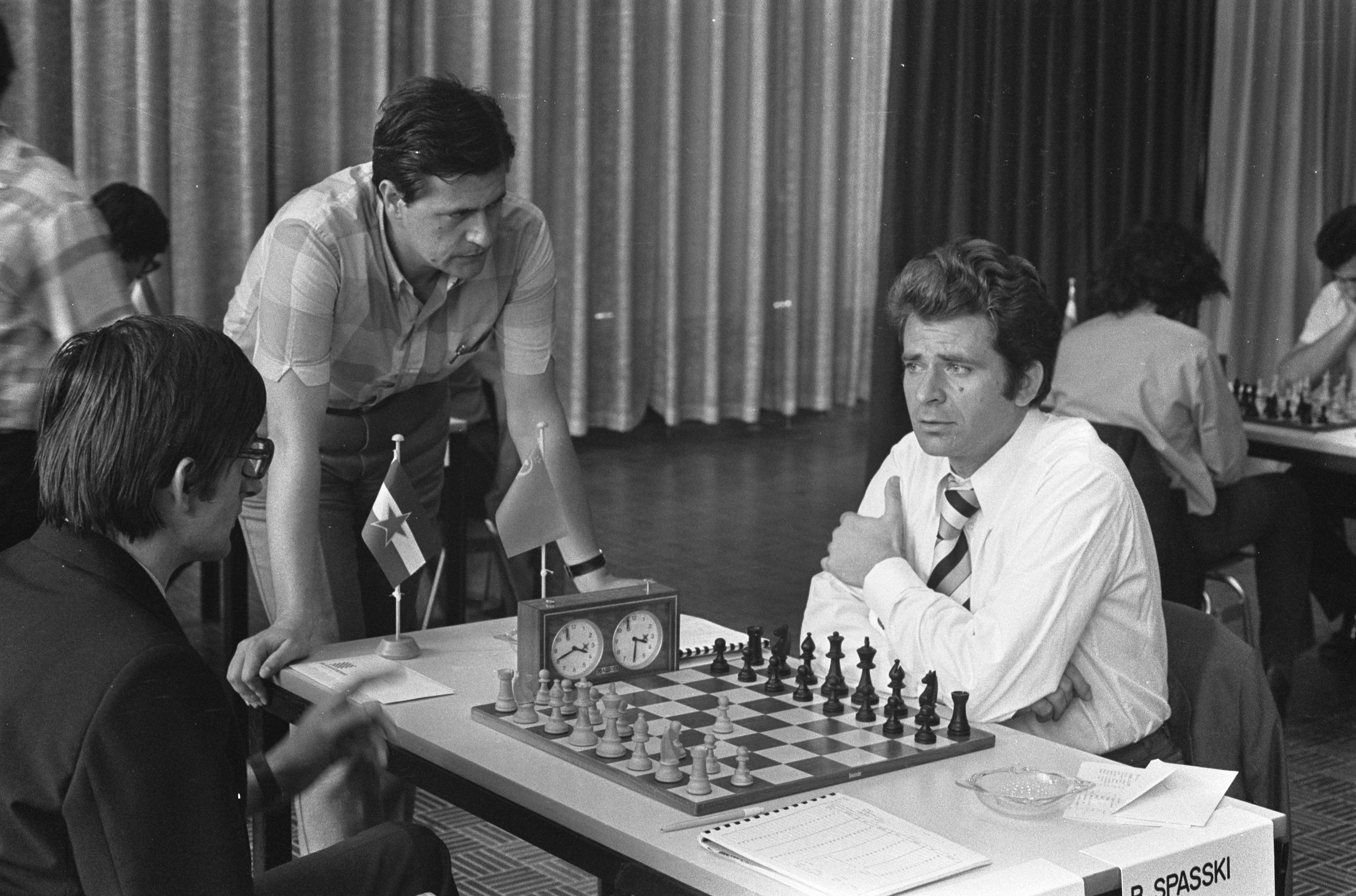
Albin Planinc (left) vs. Boris Spassky in 1973

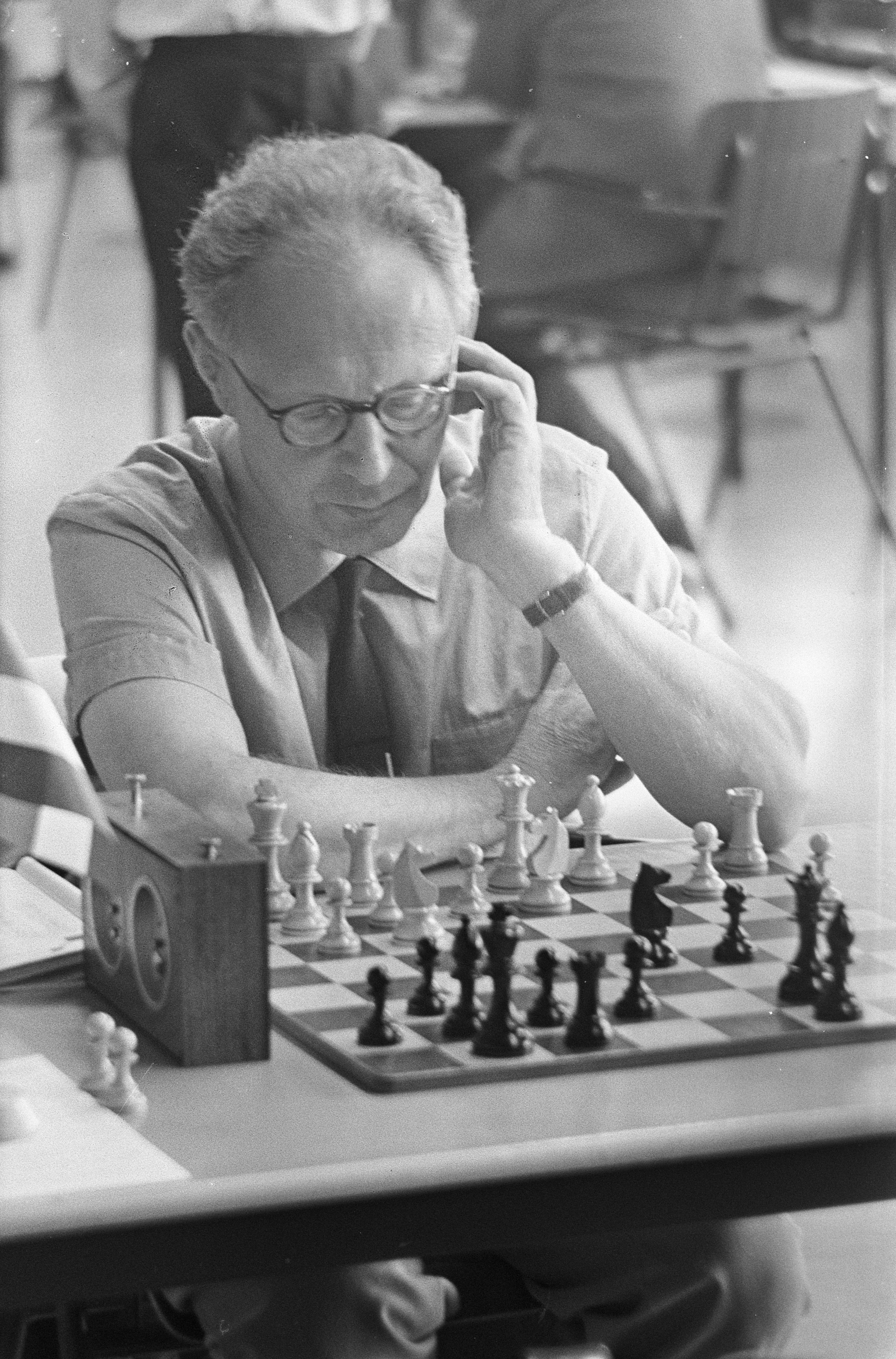
IBM 1966: Mikhail Botvinnik

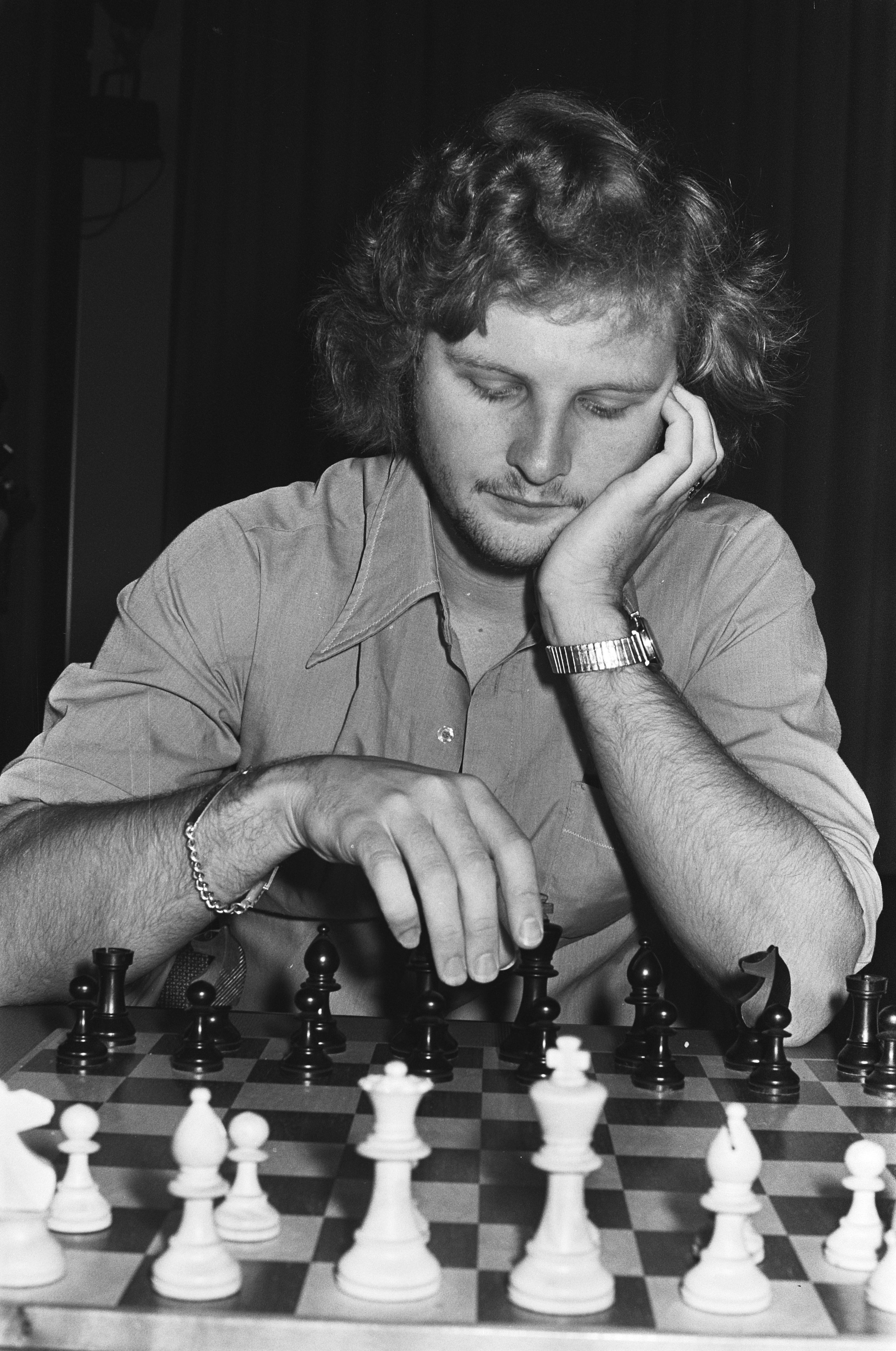
IBM 1977: Tony Miles

The IBM international chess tournament was a series of very strong chess tournaments held in the Amsterdam, Netherlands from 1961 to 1981, and was sponsored by IBM. The list of winners of the main group includes five world champions.

#	Year	Winner
1	1961	Christian Langeweg (Netherlands)
2	1962	Moshe Czerniak (Israel); Hiong Liong Tan (Indonesia)
3	1963	Lajos Portisch (Hungary)
4	1964	Bent Larsen (Denmark)
5	1965	Jan Hein Donner (Netherlands)
6	1966	Mikhail Botvinnik (USSR)
7	1967	Lajos Portisch (Hungary)
8	1968	Lubomir Kavalek (Czechoslovakia)
9	1969	Lajos Portisch (Hungary)
10	1970	Boris Spassky (USSR); Lev Polugaevsky (USSR)
11	1971	Vasily Smyslov (USSR)
12	1972	Lev Polugaevsky (USSR)
13	1973	Tigran Petrosian (USSR); Albin Planinc (Yugoslavia)
14	1974	Vlastimil Jansa (Czechoslovakia); Vladimir Tukmakov (USSR); Borislav Ivkov (Yugoslavia)
15	1975	Ljubomir Ljubojević (Yugoslavia)
16	1976	Viktor Korchnoi (Switzerland); Tony Miles (England)
17	1977	Tony Miles (England)
18	1978	Jan Timman (Netherlands)
19	1979	Vlastimil Hort (Czechoslovakia); Gyula Sax (Hungary)
20	1980	Anatoly Karpov (USSR)
21	1981	Jan Timman (Netherlands)

== See also ==
- List of strong chess tournaments
- AVRO 1938 chess tournament
- ChipTest – 1985 chess-playing computer
- Deep Blue – Chess-playing computer made by IBM
- Deep Thought – 1988 chess-playing computer
- Max Euwe Memorial Tournament
