= Phillips & Drew Kings =

1980, 1982, and 1984 British chess tournaments

The Phillips & Drew Kings was a series of chess tournaments held in London, UK, in 1980, 1982 and 1984. Sponsored by the stockbroker firm Phillips & Drew and the Greater London Council (GLC), these were among the strongest chess tournaments ever held in London. They were 14-player all-play-all tournaments held over 13 rounds. The venue was County Hall, the meeting place of the GLC. A fourth tournament, the GLC Chess Challenge, was held in 1986, at a different venue and with changes in sponsorship, but with the same format.

The 'Kings' tournaments were all category 13 or 14, and among the strongest in the world at the time. Alongside each was held a lower category (3-5) all-play-all 'Knights' tournament.

== 1980 tournament ==
The inaugural tournament, in 1980, was held from the 10–25 April. The participants were: Walter Browne, Jan Timman, Florin Gheorghiu, Ulf Andersson, Viktor Korchnoi, Ljubomir Ljubojević, Bent Larsen, Gennadi Sosonko, Tony Miles, Nigel Short, Jonathan Speelman, Gyula Sax, Michael Stean, John Nunn.

Result: Miles, Korchnoi, Andersson 8.5/13, Sosonko, Speelman 7.5, Gheorghiu, Ljubojevic, Timman 7, Sax 6.5, Browne, Larsen, Stean 5.5, Nunn 4.5, Short 2 (14 players).

== 1982 tournament ==
In 1982, the tournament was held from 15 to 30 April. The participants were (in rating order): Anatoly Karpov, Jan Timman, Lajos Portisch, Boris Spassky, Ulf Andersson, Ljubomir Ljubojević, John Nunn, Larry Christiansen, Tony Miles, Yasser Seirawan, Jonathan Speelman, Efim Geller, Jonathan Mestel, Nigel Short.

Result: Karpov, Andersson 8.5/13, Seirawan 8, Speelman, Timman, Portisch, Ljubojevic 7, Spassky, Miles 6.5, Geller 6, Nunn 5.5, Christiansen, Mestel 5, Short 3.5 (14 players).

== 1984 tournament ==
In 1984, the tournament was a category 14 event. This was the first-ever all-GM tournament to be held in the United Kingdom, and took place from 26 April to 11 May. The participants were: Anatoly Karpov, Murray Chandler, Lev Polugaevsky, Jan Timman, Zoltán Ribli, Yasser Seirawan, Viktor Korchnoi, Rafael Vaganian, Ulf Andersson, Tony Miles, Jon Speelman, Jonathan Mestel, John Nunn, and Eugenio Torre.

Result: Karpov 9/13, Chandler, Polugaevsky 8, Timman 7.5, Ribli, Seirawan 7, Korchnoi, Vaganian 6.5, Andersson, Miles, Speelman 5.5, Mestel, Nunn, Torre 5 (14 players).

== 1986 tournament ==
The 1986 tournament, not involving Phillips and Drew, was the GLC Chess Challenge. It was the final event in the series, as the GLC itself had been abolished that same year. It was held at the Great Eastern Hotel, from 11 to 17 March. The participants were: Glenn Flear, Murray Chandler, Nigel Short, John Nunn, Zoltán Ribli, Lev Polugaevsky, Lajos Portisch, Boris Spassky, Jon Speelman, Rafael Vaganian, Bent Larsen, James Plaskett, Maxim Dlugy and Jonathan Mestel.

Result: Flear 8.5/13, Chandler, Short 8, Nunn, Ribli 7.5, Polugaevsky, Portisch, Spassky 7, Vaganian, Speelman 6, Larsen 5.5, Plaskett 5, Mestel, Dlugy 4 (14 players).

This was one of the greatest upsets in chess history. Flear, an International Master from Leicester, was a last-minute replacement for Karpov and was not expected to score well in such a high class field.

== Sources and external links ==
- London 1980 Phillips and Drew Kings Chess Tournament (Hartston and Reuben, 1981)
- Phillips & Drew Kings Chess Tournament 1982
- Phillips & Drew Kings Chess Tournament 1984
- GLC Chess Challenge of 1986
