= Hoogovens Wijk aan Zee Chess Tournament 1992 =

Chess tournament

- Venue: Wijk aan Zee

The Hoogovens Wijk aan Zee Steel Chess Tournament 1992 was the 54th edition of the Wijk aan Zee Chess Tournament. It was held in Wijk aan Zee in January 1992 and was jointly won by Valery Salov and Boris Gelfand.

54th Hoogovens tournament, group A, 9–26 January 1992, Wijk aan Zee, Netherlands, Category XIV (2593)
| | Player | Rating | 1 | 2 | 3 | 4 | 5 | 6 | 7 | 8 | 9 | 10 | 11 | 12 | 13 | 14 | Total | TPR | Place |
|---|---|---|---|---|---|---|---|---|---|---|---|---|---|---|---|---|---|---|---|
| 1 | Valery Salov (Russia) | 2655 | | ½ | ½ | ½ | ½ | ½ | 1 | 1 | ½ | ½ | ½ | ½ | 1 | 1 | 8½ | 2698 | 1–2 |
| 2 | Boris Gelfand (Belarus) | 2665 | ½ | | ½ | ½ | ½ | ½ | ½ | 1 | ½ | 1 | ½ | ½ | 1 | 1 | 8½ | 2697 | 1–2 |
| 3 | Viktor Korchnoi (Switzerland) | 2585 | ½ | ½ | | ½ | ½ | ½ | ½ | 1 | ½ | ½ | 1 | ½ | ½ | ½ | 7½ | 2650 | 3–4 |
| 4 | Robert Hübner (Germany) | 2615 | ½ | ½ | ½ | | ½ | ½ | ½ | ½ | ½ | ½ | 1 | ½ | ½ | 1 | 7½ | 2648 | 3–4 |
| 5 | Predrag Nikolić (Yugoslavia) | 2635 | ½ | ½ | ½ | ½ | | ½ | ½ | ½ | ½ | ½ | ½ | 0 | 1 | ½ | 6½ | 2589 | 5–8 |
| 6 | Jeroen Piket (Netherlands) | 2615 | ½ | ½ | ½ | ½ | ½ | | ½ | 0 | ½ | ½ | 0 | 1 | 1 | ½ | 6½ | 2591 | 5–8 |
| 7 | Yasser Seirawan (United States) | 2600 | 0 | ½ | ½ | ½ | ½ | ½ | | ½ | ½ | ½ | 1 | 1 | 0 | ½ | 6½ | 2592 | 5–8 |
| 8 | Vladimir Epishin (Russia) | 2620 | 0 | 0 | 0 | ½ | ½ | 1 | ½ | | 1 | ½ | 0 | ½ | 1 | 1 | 6½ | 2590 | 5–8 |
| 9 | John van der Wiel (Netherlands) | 2540 | ½ | ½ | ½ | ½ | ½ | ½ | ½ | 0 | | ½ | 1 | 0 | 0 | 1 | 6 | 2568 | 9–11 |
| 10 | Gyula Sax (Hungary) | 2600 | ½ | 0 | ½ | ½ | ½ | ½ | ½ | ½ | ½ | | ½ | ½ | ½ | ½ | 6 | 2563 | 9–11 |
| 11 | Loek van Wely (Netherlands) | 2560 | ½ | ½ | 0 | 0 | ½ | 1 | 0 | 1 | 0 | ½ | | 1 | ½ | ½ | 6 | 2566 | 9–11 |
| 12 | John Nunn (England) | 2615 | ½ | ½ | ½ | ½ | 1 | 0 | 0 | ½ | 1 | ½ | 0 | | 0 | ½ | 5½ | 2534 | 12–13 |
| 13 | Joris Brenninkmeijer (Netherlands) | 2500 | 0 | 0 | ½ | ½ | 0 | 0 | 1 | 0 | 1 | ½ | ½ | 1 | | ½ | 5½ | 2543 | 12–13 |
| 14 | Alfonso Romero Holmes (Spain) | 2490 | 0 | 0 | ½ | 0 | ½ | ½ | ½ | 0 | 0 | ½ | ½ | ½ | ½ | | 4 | 2459 | 14 |

54th Hoogovens tournament, group B, January 1992, Wijk aan Zee, Netherlands, Category X (2489)
| | Player | Rating | 1 | 2 | 3 | 4 | 5 | 6 | 7 | 8 | 9 | 10 | 11 | 12 | Total | TPR | Place |
|---|---|---|---|---|---|---|---|---|---|---|---|---|---|---|---|---|---|
| 1 | GM Vladimir Tukmakov (Ukraine) | 2535 | | ½ | 1 | ½ | 1 | 1 | 1 | 1 | ½ | ½ | 1 | 1 | 9 | 2747 | 1 |
| 2 | GM Patrick Wolff (United States) | 2570 | ½ | | 1 | 1 | 1 | ½ | ½ | ½ | 1 | 1 | ½ | 1 | 8½ | 2692 | 2 |
| 3 | IM Friso Nijboer (Netherlands) | 2455 | 0 | 0 | | 0 | 0 | 1 | ½ | 1 | 1 | 1 | 1 | 1 | 6½ | 2557 | 3 |
| 4 | IM Luc Winants (Belgium) | 2515 | ½ | 0 | 1 | | 1 | 0 | ½ | ½ | 1 | 1 | ½ | 0 | 6 | 2522 | 4–5 |
| 5 | IM Viktor Moskalenko (Ukraine) | 2505 | 0 | 0 | 1 | 0 | | ½ | 1 | 1 | 0 | 1 | 1 | ½ | 6 | 2523 | 4–5 |
| 6 | IM Gert-Jan De Boer (Netherlands) | 2425 | 0 | ½ | 0 | 1 | ½ | | 0 | 0 | 1 | ½ | 1 | 1 | 5½ | 2495 | 6 |
| 7 | GM Roberto Cifuentes (Chile) | 2540 | 0 | ½ | ½ | ½ | 0 | 1 | | ½ | ½ | 1 | ½ | 0 | 5 | 2448 | 7 |
| 8 | IM Ben Finegold (United States) | 2465 | 0 | ½ | 0 | ½ | 0 | 1 | ½ | | ½ | 0 | ½ | 1 | 4½ | 2426 | 8–9 |
| 9 | IM Johannes Van Mil (Netherlands) | 2445 | ½ | 0 | 0 | 0 | 1 | 0 | ½ | ½ | | 0 | 1 | 1 | 4½ | 2428 | 8–9 |
| 10 | GM David Bronstein (Russia) | 2465 | ½ | 0 | 0 | 0 | 0 | ½ | 0 | 1 | 1 | | ½ | ½ | 4 | 2389 | 10 |
| 11 | GM Evgenij Ermenkov (Bulgaria) | 2505 | 0 | ½ | 0 | ½ | 0 | 0 | ½ | ½ | 0 | ½ | | 1 | 3½ | 2354 | 11 |
| 12 | IM Marinus Kuijf (Netherlands) | 2440 | 0 | 0 | 0 | 1 | ½ | 0 | 1 | 0 | 0 | ½ | 0 | | 3 | 2318 | 12 |
