= Kings Tournament =

International chess tournament

The Kings Tournament (Romanian: Turneul Regilor) is an international chess tournament contested annually since 2007 in Romania. The tournament is organised by the Bucharest chess club Elisabeta Polihroniade and the company Romgaz.

== History and organisation ==
Until 2011, the tournament took place throughout the month of June. The three first editions (2007 to 2009) took place in Bazna. Since 2010, the tournament has been a double round-robin. In 2010 and 2011 (fourth and fifth editions), there were six participants and it took place in Mediaș; it included the world number one Magnus Carlsen. In 2012, after being postponed, the tournament took place from 7 to 14 November in Bucharest with four players; Vasyl Ivanchuk won the tournament. In 2013, the tournament took place in October with only five participants, with the eventual winner being Fabiano Caruana. In 2014, the tournament was organised via the Scheveningen system : a match-tournament between the Chinese and Romanian national teams.

In 2010 and 2011, the winner of the tournament, Magnus Carlsen, qualified for the Bilbao Chess Masters Final which took place at the year end.

== Honours (2007-2013) ==
Édition Année		Date	Place	Winner	Federation	Score	Second	Third	Players	Category (Average Elo)
1	2007	15-27 June	Bazna	Alexander Khalifman	Russia	7 / 10 (+5 –1 =4)	Rafael Vaganian	Zoltan Ribli; Lajos Portisch	11	XIV (2566)
2	2008	24 mai - 4 June	Bazna	Nigel Short	England	7 / 10 (+4 =6)	Lajos Portisch; Ulf Andersson		11	XIV (2572)
3	2009	14–25 June	Bazna	Vassily Ivanchuk	Ukraine	7 / 10 (+4 =6)	Boris Gelfand	Teimour Radjabov; Alexei Shirov	6	XX (2729)
4	2010	14–25 June	Mediaș	Magnus Carlsen	Norway	7,5 / 10 (+4 =5)	Boris Gelfand	Teimour Radjabov	6	XX (2742)
5	2011	11–23 June	Mediaș	Magnus Carlsen	Norway	6,5 / 10 (+3 =7)	Sergey Karjakin	Hikaru Nakamura; Teimour Radjabov	6	XXI (2760)
6	2012	7–14 November	Bucharest	Vasyl Ivanchuk	Ukraine	3,5 / 6 (+1 =5)	Veselin Topalov	Fabiano Caruana	4	XX (2747)
7	2013	6–17 October	Bucharest	Fabiano Caruana	Italy	5 / 8 (+3 –1 =4)	Wang Hao	Liviu-Dieter Nisipeanu	5	XIX (2731)

== Sixth edition (2012) : win for Ivanchuk after tie ==
Round 1 7.11.12

Ivanchuk - Nisipeanu 1 - 0

Position: g8 black king, g7 black pawn, e6 black pawn, f6 black pawn, c5 white rook, h5 black pawn, d4 white pawn, h4 white pawn, c3 white bishop, e3 white pawn, g3 white king, b2 white pawn, c2 black rook, e2 black bishop, f2 white pawn, g2 white pawn

Position after 41... Fe2 coming from e3

The tournament, initially due to take place from 23 June to 4 July 2012, was cancelled after the withdrawal of the sponsor Romgaz. It eventually took place from 7 to 14 November in Bucharest with four players (Ivantchouk, Topalov, Caruana and Nisipeanu. After 6 games, Vassili Ivantchouk and Veselin Topalov were tied on points at 3,5/6. The two players then played speed games, with Ivantchouk winning the first and tying the second, winning him his second Kings Tournament.

Vassili Ivantchouk (2763) - Liviu-Dieter Nisipeanu (2668) [CODE ECO E32]

1.d4 Cf6 2.c4 e6 3.Cc3 Fb4 4.Dc2 0–0 5.a3 Fxc3+ 6.Dxc3 b5 7.cxb5 c6 8.Fg5 cxb5 9.e3 Fb7 10.Cf3 a6 11.Fd3 h6 12.Fh4 d6 13.0–0 Cbd7 14.Db4 Db6 15.Fg3 Fe4 16.Fe2 Tfc8 17.Tfc1 Ce8 18.Cd2 Fc2 19.h3 Tab8 20.a4 bxa4 21.Dxb6 Cxb6 22.Fxa6 Tc7 23.Fb5 f6 24.Fxe8 Txe8 25.Fxd6 Tc6 26.Fc5 Fg6 27.Cc4 Cxc4 28.Txc4 Ta8 29.Tcxa4 Txa4 30.Txa4 Fd3 31.Ta3 Fe2 32.Ta8+ Rf7 33.Ta7+ Rg8 34.Tb7 Ta6 35.Fb4 Ta1+ 36.Rh2 Tc1 37.h4 h5 38.Fc3 Fc4 39.Tc7 Fd3 40.Tc5 Tc2 41.Rg3 Fe2 [See diagram] 42.e4 Rf7 43.d5 exd5 44.Txd5 Fg4 45.f3 Fe6 46.Txh5 Fc4 47.e5 Rg6 48.Th8 Ff1 49.exf6 1–0

== Since 2014 ==
=== Eighth edition (2014) : Romania - China ===
In 2014 the Kings Tournament was a preliminary blitz tournament between six Romanian and four Chinese players, followed by a four-round match between a team of four Romanians (Lupulescu, Parligras, Jianu and Nevednichy) and four Chinese (Wang Yue, Wei Yi, Ni Hua and Lu shanglei). China won the match 13 to 3. The two best players in each team played a rapid match. Wang Yue beat Jianu.

=== Ninth edition (2015) : Romania - Germany ===
In 2015, the Kings Tournament was a five-round match between a Romania team (Deac, Parligras, Marin, Nevednichy and Lupulescu) and a Germany team (Wagner, Buhmann, Blübaum, Donchenko and Fridman). The German team won 14 to 11.

=== Tenth edition (2016) : Vladimir Kramnik - Hou Yifan rapid and blitz matches ===
In 2016, the Kings Tournament consisted of an eight-part rapid match and a 12 part blitz match between Vladimir Kramnik and Hou Yifan. Kramnik won the rapid match 5,5 to 2,5 and the blitz match 6 to 4.

There was also a rapid tournament between five players and five Romanian players, won by Vlad-Christian Janu beating Mihail Marin, Bogdan-Daniel Deac and Levente Vajda.

=== 11th edition (2017) : Rapid and blitz tournaments ===
In 2017, the Kings Tournament consisted of two rapid tournaments (mixed and women's) and two blitz tournaments (mixed and women's). Vassili Ivantchouk won the blitz and rapid tournaments beating Sergueï Kariakine, Wei Yi and Bogdan-Daniel Deac.

Anna Muzychuk won the two women's tournaments, beating Elisabeth Pähtz, Pia Cramling and Corina-Isabela Peptan.
