= Theodore Tylor =

British lawyer and international level chess player

- Born: 13 May 1900; Bournville, England
- Died: 23 October 1968 (aged 68); Oxford, England
- Occupation: Chess player

Sir Theodore Henry Tylor (13 May 1900 – 23 October 1968) was a lawyer and international level chess player, despite being nearly blind.

== Early life and education ==
Born in Bournville, Tylor learned to play chess at age seven. His chess skill increased while he attended Worcester College for the Blind from 1909 to 1918. He studied at Oxford University beginning in 1918, and captained the Oxford University Chess Club. Tylor received First-class Honours in Jurisprudence in 1922 and was made an honorary scholar of Balliol College. The next year, he became a Bachelor of Civil Law and a lecturer at Balliol College. Called to the Bar by the Inner Temple with a certificate of honour, he was made a Fellow at Balliol College in 1928.

== Competitions and rankings ==
Tylor competed in twelve British Championships, finishing fourth in his first appearance in 1925. His best result was in 1933, finishing second to Mir Sultan Khan. He tied for first at the 1929–30 Hastings Premier Reserves alongside George Koltanowski ahead of Salo Flohr, Josef Rejfiř, Ludwig Rellstab, C.H.O'D. Alexander, Daniël Noteboom, and Milan Vidmar. Tylor played in the top section, the Hastings Premier, nine times beginning in 1930–1. His best finish was 6th= in 1936–7. He was first reserve for the English team at the Hamburg 1930 Chess Olympiad.

Tylor won the British Correspondence Chess Championship in 1932, 1933, and 1934. He shared 5–6th at Margate 1936 with P. S. Milner-Barry, but he won their individual game and drew with 2nd- to 4th-place finishers José Raúl Capablanca, Gideon Ståhlberg, and Erik Lundin (Salo Flohr won). Although he finished 12th at Nottingham 1936, he had the best score of the British participants, ahead of C. H. O'D. Alexander, G. A. Thomas, and William Winter. Mikhail Botvinnik noted that Tylor was using a tactile chess board that he incessantly fingered, as well as a device for counting the number of moves made.

== Other positions ==
Tylor was President of the Midland Counties' Chess Union from 1947 to 1950, but his work for the university and for the welfare of the blind limited the time he had to devote to chess. In 1965, he was knighted for his service to organisations for the blind. He was Fellow and Tutor in Jurisprudence at Balliol College, Oxford for almost forty years. Tylor also enjoyed bridge.

== Death ==
He died in Oxford on 23 October 1968.
