= Nottingham 1936 chess tournament =

The Nottingham 1936 chess tournament was a 15-player round robin tournament held August 10–28 at the University of Nottingham. It was one of the strongest of all time.

Dr. J. Hannak wrote in his 1959 biography of Emanuel Lasker that "when it comes to awarding the plum for 'the greatest chess tournament ever', in 1936, the Nottingham Tournament was certainly just that". W. H. Watts in the Introduction to the tournament book called Nottingham 1936 "the most important chess event the world has so far seen".

It is one of the very few tournaments in chess history to include five past, present, or future world champions (Lasker, Capablanca, Alekhine, Euwe and Botvinnik). (Since then, Moscow 1971 and the 1973 USSR Chess Championship both included five world champions: Anatoly Karpov, Vasily Smyslov, Tigran Petrosian, Mikhail Tal, and Boris Spassky).

A number of other top players were also in the tournament. According to the unofficial Chessmetrics ratings, the tournament was (as of March 2005) one of only six tournaments in history that had the top eight players in the world playing. (Chessmetrics gives the top eight at the time as, in order: Euwe, Botvinnik, Alekhine, Flohr, Capablanca, Reshevsky, Fine, Bogoljubow).

The event is also notable for being Lasker's last major event, and for Botvinnik achieving the first Soviet success outside the Soviet Union.

According to D. Kandelaki, the head of the Soviet trade mission in Berlin, in a secret letter to General Levin in Moscow dated 27th November 1936, the German Foreign Ministry had complained about an article in Issue #17 of the trade agency's magazine “Soviet Economy and Foreign Trade” mentioning the chess tournament. The trade mission replied to the German Foreign Ministry that they would avoid publishing articles about chess tournaments in future.

In parallel with the main tournament, the venue also played host to the 1936 British Women's Championship. The event was won by Edith Holloway (1868-1956), age sixty-eight and a former winner in 1919.

== Results ==
Nottingham 1936
#	Player	01	02	03	04	05	06	07	08	09	10	11	12	13	14	15	Score
1	Mikhail Botvinnik (USSR)	x	½	½	½	½	½	½	½	1	1	1	1	1	1	½	10
2	José Raúl Capablanca (CUB)	½	x	½	½	1	1	0	½	1	½	½	1	1	1	1	10
3	Max Euwe (NED)	½	½	x	½	1	0	½	0	1	½	1	1	1	1	1	9½
4	Reuben Fine (USA)	½	½	½	x	½	½	½	1	½	1	½	1	1	½	1	9½
5	Samuel Reshevsky (USA)	½	0	0	½	x	1	½	1	1	1	½	1	1	1	½	9½
6	Alexander Alekhine (FRA)	½	0	1	½	0	x	1	½	½	1	1	½	1	½	1	9
7	Salo Flohr (CSK)	½	1	½	½	½	0	x	1	1	1	½	0	0	1	1	8½
8	Emanuel Lasker (USSR)	½	½	1	0	0	½	0	x	½	1	½	1	1	1	1	8½
9	Milan Vidmar (YUG)	0	0	0	½	0	½	0	½	x	1	½	½	1	½	1	6
10	Efim Bogoljubow (GER)	0	½	½	0	0	0	0	0	0	x	½	1	1	1	1	5½
11	Savielly Tartakower (POL)	0	½	0	½	½	0	½	½	½	½	x	0	0	1	1	5½
12	Theodore Tylor (UK)	0	0	0	0	0	½	1	0	½	0	1	x	½	½	½	4½
13	C.H.O'D Alexander (UK)	0	0	0	0	0	0	1	0	0	0	1	½	x	½	½	3½
14	George Alan Thomas (UK)	0	0	0	½	0	½	0	0	½	0	0	½	½	x	½	3
15	William Winter (UK)	½	0	0	0	½	0	0	0	0	0	0	½	½	½	x	2½
