= Vladimir Tukmakov =

Ukrainian chess grandmaster (born 1946)

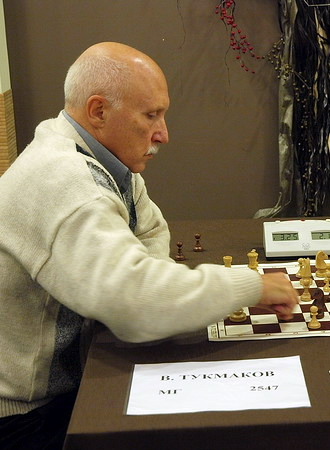

Personal information
- Born: March 5, 1946 (age 80) Odesa, Ukrainian SSR, Soviet Union

Chess career
- Country: Ukraine
- Title: Grandmaster (1972)
- FIDE rating: 2540 (November 2026)
- Peak rating: 2610 (January 1998)
- Peak ranking: No. 17 (July 1983)

Vladimir Borisovich Tukmakov (Ukrainian: Володимир Борисович Тукмаков, romanized: Volodymyr Borysovych Tukmakov, born March 5, 1946, in Odesa) is a Ukrainian chess grandmaster. He gained the Grandmaster title in 1972.

== Career ==
His career first blossomed when he helped and then led the USSR to consecutive wins of the World Student Team Championship from 1966 to 1972, winning nine gold medals along the way.

In the 1970s and 1980s he progressed to the senior Soviet Russian team and was again on the multiple gold medal winning trail. In his only Olympiad appearance in 1984 he took team gold and in 1973, 1983 and 1989 he played in the European Team Chess Championship, where his collective haul was an amazing 5 (three team and two individual) gold medals.

In international tournaments, his best results include second place (after Fischer) at Buenos Aires 1970, 2nd (after Karpov) at Madrid 1973, 1st= (with Jansa and Ivkov) at IBM Amsterdam tournament 1974, 1st at Decin 1977, 1st= (with Sax) at Las Palmas 1978, 1st at Vilnius 1978 (ahead of Tigran Petrosian) and 1st at Malta 1980. At Yerevan 1982, he was 2nd (after Yusupov), at Tilburg 1984, 2nd= (after Miles). Tukmakov also won the strong Lugano Open in 1985 and the 30th Reggio Emilia tournament 1987/88; at Amsterdam OHRA-B (Open) 1990, shared first place with Judit Polgár. He won the Canadian Open Chess Championship in 1989 and 1994.

At the Gijon (active) tournament of 1988, he showed he was a fine player of rapid chess too, finishing joint first with Anatoly Karpov.

Of his many attempts to become Soviet champion he came very close on three occasions; at Riga 1970, Baku 1972 and at Moscow 1983, where he finished behind Korchnoi, Tal and Karpov respectively. He was however the national champion of Ukraine in 1970.

At the London 1984 USSR vs Rest of the World clash, he made a surprising, but important contribution. Starting as a reserve for the USSR team, he was twice asked to substitute for Smyslov on board 4 and then once for Polugaevsky on board 3. The outcome was that he delivered the team a net plus score against Ljubojević (one win and one draw) and Korchnoi (draw).

Although much less active as a player in later years, Tukmakov maintained a competitive Elo rating of 2551 as of October 2007. At the Odesa rapid tournament in 2007, he got off to a flying start, he began with a draw against Korchnoi and wins over Smirin and Bacrot, all of whom were highly rated opponents. However, his performance declined in the later rounds, and he lost his remaining games.

He was non-playing captain with the victorious Ukraine team at the 36th Chess Olympiad in Calvià (2004). In the same year he was awarded the title of FIDE Senior Trainer.

Anish Giri, a Dutch grandmaster, started working with Tukmakov in 2014.

== Books ==
- Tukmakov, Vladimir (2012). Profession: Chessplayer - Grandmaster at Work. Russell Enterprises Inc. ISBN 9781936490288.
- Tukmakov, Vladimir (2012). Modern Chess Preparation - Getting Ready for Your Opponent in the Information Age. New In Chess. ISBN 9789056913779.
- Tukmakov, Vladimir (2015). Risk & Bluff in Chess. The Art of Taking Calculated Risks. New In Chess. ISBN 9789056915957.
- Tukmakov, Vladimir (2019). Coaching the Chess Stars. Thinkers Publishing. ISBN 9789492510501.
- Tukmakov, Vladimir (2020). Modern Chess Formula - The Powerful Impact of Engines. Thinkers Publishing. ISBN 9789492510815.
- Tukmakov, Vladimir (2020). A Feast of Chess in Time of Plague - Candidates Tournament 2020 - Part 1 - Yekaterinburg. Thinkers Publishing. ISBN 9789492510921.
