= Aerosvit chess tournament =

Annual event in Foros Ukraine (2006–08)

The Aerosvit chess tournament (Ukrainian: Міжнародний шаховий турнір «Аеросвіт») was an annual chess tournament played in Foros, Ukraine, and sponsored by the now defunct Aerosvit Airlines. It started in 2006, was last played in 2008, and the format was a closed single round-robin tournament of twelve players.

== Winners ==
#	Year	Winner(s)	Points	Category
1	2006	Sergei Rublevsky (Russia)	7.5	XVIII (2691)
2	2007	Vassily Ivanchuk (Ukraine)	7.5	XVIII (2694)
3	2008	Magnus Carlsen (Norway)	8	XIX (2712)
