= New York 1931 chess tournament =

At the New York 1931 chess tournament José Raúl Capablanca (Cuba) won with 10 points from 11 games, 1½ points ahead of Isaac Kashdan (United States).

New York tournament 1931
		01	02	03	04	05	06	07	08	09	10	11	12	Result
1	José Raúl Capablanca (CUB)	X	½	1	½	1	1	1	1	1	1	1	1	10
2	Isaac Kashdan (USA)	½	X	1	½	1	½	1	½	1	½	1	1	8½
3	Alexander Kevitz (USA)	0	0	X	½	0	1	1	½	1	1	1	1	7
4	Herman Steiner (USA)	½	½	½	X	½	½	0	1	0	½	½	1	5½
5	Israel Albert Horowitz (USA)	0	0	1	½	X	½	0	1	0	1	1	½	5½
6	Abraham Kupchik (USA)	0	½	0	½	½	X	0	1	½	½	1	1	5½
7	Anthony Santasiere (USA)	0	0	0	1	1	1	X	0	0	0	1	1	5
8	Isador Samuel Turover (USA)	0	½	½	0	0	0	1	X	1	1	½	0	4½
9	Edward Lasker (USA)	0	0	0	1	1	½	1	0	X	½	0	0	4
10	Arthur Dake (USA)	0	½	0	½	0	½	1	0	½	X	0	1	4
11	Frank Marshall (USA)	0	0	0	½	0	0	0	½	1	1	X	1	4
12	Maurice Fox (CAN)	0	0	0	0	½	0	0	1	1	0	0	X	2½
