= Berlin 1897 chess tournament =

German chess event

The Internationales Turnier Berlin 1897 celebrated seventy years of the Berliner Schachgesellschaft. Twenty of the world's best players started but Curt von Bardeleben had to withdraw after a short draw. They played in the Architektenhaus from September 13 to October 4, 1897. Eventually the event became a race between Rudolf Charousek and Carl August Walbrodt. The youngsters had prevailed at the end of the tiring event. The first won 2000 Mark and the second one - 1500 Mark. Unfortunately, they would die within a few years (Charousek in 1900, and Walbrodt in 1902).

The results and standings:

#	Player	1	2	3	4	5	6	7	8	9	10	11	12	13	14	15	16	17	18	19	Total
1	Rudolf Charousek (Hungary)	x	0	½	1	0	½	½	1	1	1	1	½	1	1	1	1	½	1	1	13.5
2	Carl August Walbrodt (German Empire)	1	x	1	½	1	½	½	1	½	½	0	1	1	1	0	½	1	1	1	13.0
3	Joseph Henry Blackburne (United Kingdom)	½	0	x	½	½	½	1	½	1	1	½	½	1	0	½	1	1	1	1	12.0
4	Dawid Janowski (France)	0	½	½	x	1	½	½	½	½	1	1	1	0	1	1	0	½	1	1	11.5
5	Amos Burn (United Kingdom)	1	0	½	0	x	1	1	½	1	0	1	0	1	1	½	0	1	1	½	11.0
6	Carl Schlechter (Austria)	½	½	½	½	0	x	0	½	½	1	½	1	½	1	½	½	½	1	1	10.5
7	Georg Marco (Austria)	½	½	0	½	0	1	x	0	½	0	½	½	1	1	1	1	½	1	1	10.5
8	Simon Alapin (Russian Empire)	0	0	½	½	½	½	1	x	0	½	0	½	1	½	1	1	1	1	1	10.5
9	Horatio Caro (German Empire)	0	½	0	½	0	½	½	1	x	½	1	1	½	½	1	0	1	½	1	10.0
10	Mikhail Chigorin (Russian Empire)	0	½	0	0	1	0	1	½	½	x	½	0	0	1	½	1	1	1	1	9.5
11	Emanuel Schiffers (Russian Empire)	0	1	½	0	0	½	½	1	0	½	x	1	0	1	½	0	½	1	1	9.0
12	Johannes Metger (German Empire)	½	0	½	0	1	0	½	½	0	1	0	x	1	0	1	1	1	0	½	8.5
13	Wilhelm Cohn (German Empire)	0	0	0	1	0	½	0	0	½	1	1	0	x	0	0	1	1	½	1	7.5
14	Szymon Winawer (Poland)	0	0	1	0	0	0	0	½	½	0	0	1	1	x	1	½	0	1	1	7.5
15	Hugo Süchting (German Empire)	0	1	½	0	½	½	0	0	0	½	½	0	1	0	x	1	½	0	1	7.0
16	Richard Teichmann (German Empire)	0	½	0	1	1	½	0	0	1	0	1	0	0	½	0	x	½	½	0	6.5
17	Berthold Englisch (Austria)	½	0	0	½	0	½	½	0	0	0	½	0	0	1	½	½	x	0	1	5.5
18	Adolf Zinkl (Bohemia)	0	0	0	0	0	0	0	0	½	0	0	1	½	0	1	½	1	x	1	5.5
19	Adolf Albin (Romania)	0	0	0	0	½	0	0	0	0	0	0	½	0	0	0	1	0	0	x	2.0
