= Max Euwe Memorial Tournament =

Chess tournament in the Netherlands

The Max Euwe Memorial Tournament was an annual international invitation chess tournament played in honour of Max Euwe (1901–1981) from 1987 to 1996. It was played in Amsterdam, the Netherlands (with the exception of 1990 when it was played in Rotterdam). In 1976, while Euwe was still alive, a jubilee tournament was held which can be seen as a prequel of the series.

== History ==
From 1987 to 1996, ten consecutive Euwe Memorial editions were held. The event was usually played as a mini-tournament in a double round-robin of four top players from the absolute world elite with the exception of the fifth edition in 1991 and the tenth edition in 1996 inviting ten players in a single round robin. If there was a tie on top, there was no play-off.

The last edition of the principal Memorial series was organized in 1996, mainly because the main sponsor Verenigde Spaarbank (VSB) lost its interest.

== Related ==
In addition, there was later a moderate strong and independent "Euwe Stimulans" tournament, played at Arnhem in 2007, Amon Simutowe from Zambia won, completing his final GM norm in the process to become a chess grandmaster. Also at that event, which had a line-up of ten players, Fridrik Olafsson played a famous game against Vincent Rothuis.

The Ideal Max Euwe International Tournament in São Paulo 2008 was subclaimed as "2nd Euwe Stimulans" Tournament. This ten-player round robin featured three players from Brazil plus seven players from other countries. Zhao Zong Yuan and Gilberto Milos were shared winners, ahead of clear third John van der Wiel.

A next Max Euwe Memorial commemorating the former World Chess Champion and President of FIDE who died 26 November 1981 took place in Amsterdam on 13–20 November 2011. Aside from various events (i.e. simultaneous exhibitions), a men's and a women's four-player double round robin was held which was won by (then 13-time Dutch Women's Champion) Zhaoqin Peng in Group 1, while Robin van Kampen took the honours in Group 2.

== Winners ==
#	Year	Winner
-	1976	Anatoly Karpov (Soviet Union)
1	1987	Anatoly Karpov (Soviet Union); Jan Timman (Netherlands)
2	1988	Nigel Short (England)
3	1989	Jan Timman (Netherlands)
4	1990	Viktor Korchnoi (Switzerland)
5	1991	Valery Salov (Russia); Nigel Short (England)
6	1992	Nigel Short (England); Viswanathan Anand (India)
7	1993	Nigel Short (England); Viswanathan Anand (India); Vladimir Kramnik (Russia)
8	1994	Garry Kasparov (Russia)
9	1995	Joël Lautier (France)
10	1996	Veselin Topalov (Bulgaria); Garry Kasparov (Russia)

== Results ==
=== 1996 ===
Euwe Memorial 1996, Amsterdam, Netherlands, 22 march – 1 April 1996
	Player	Rating	1	2	3	4	5	6	7	8	9	10	Points
1	Veselin Topalov (Bulgaria)	2700	X	1	0	1	0	1	½	1	1	1	6½
2	Garry Kasparov (Russia)	2775	0	X	½	1	1	½	1	1	1	½	6½
3	Nigel Short (England)	2665	1	½	X	0	½	0	½	1	½	1	5
4	Vishwanathan Anand (India)	2725	0	0	1	X	1	½	½	½	½	1	5
5	Vladimir Kramnik (Russia)	2775	1	0	½	0	X	½	1	½	½	½	4½
6	Joel Lautier (France)	2630	0	½	1	½	½	X	0	1	0	1	4½
7	Yasser Seirawan (United States)	2630	½	0	½	½	0	1	X	0	1	½	4
8	Boris Gelfand (Israel)	2700	0	0	0	½	½	0	1	X	1	½	3½
9	Jeroen Piket (Netherlands)	2570	0	0	½	½	½	1	0	0	X	½	3
10	Jan Timman (Netherlands)	2620	0	½	0	0	½	0	½	½	½	X	2½
