= Gyula Sax =

Hungarian chess grandmaster (1951–2014)

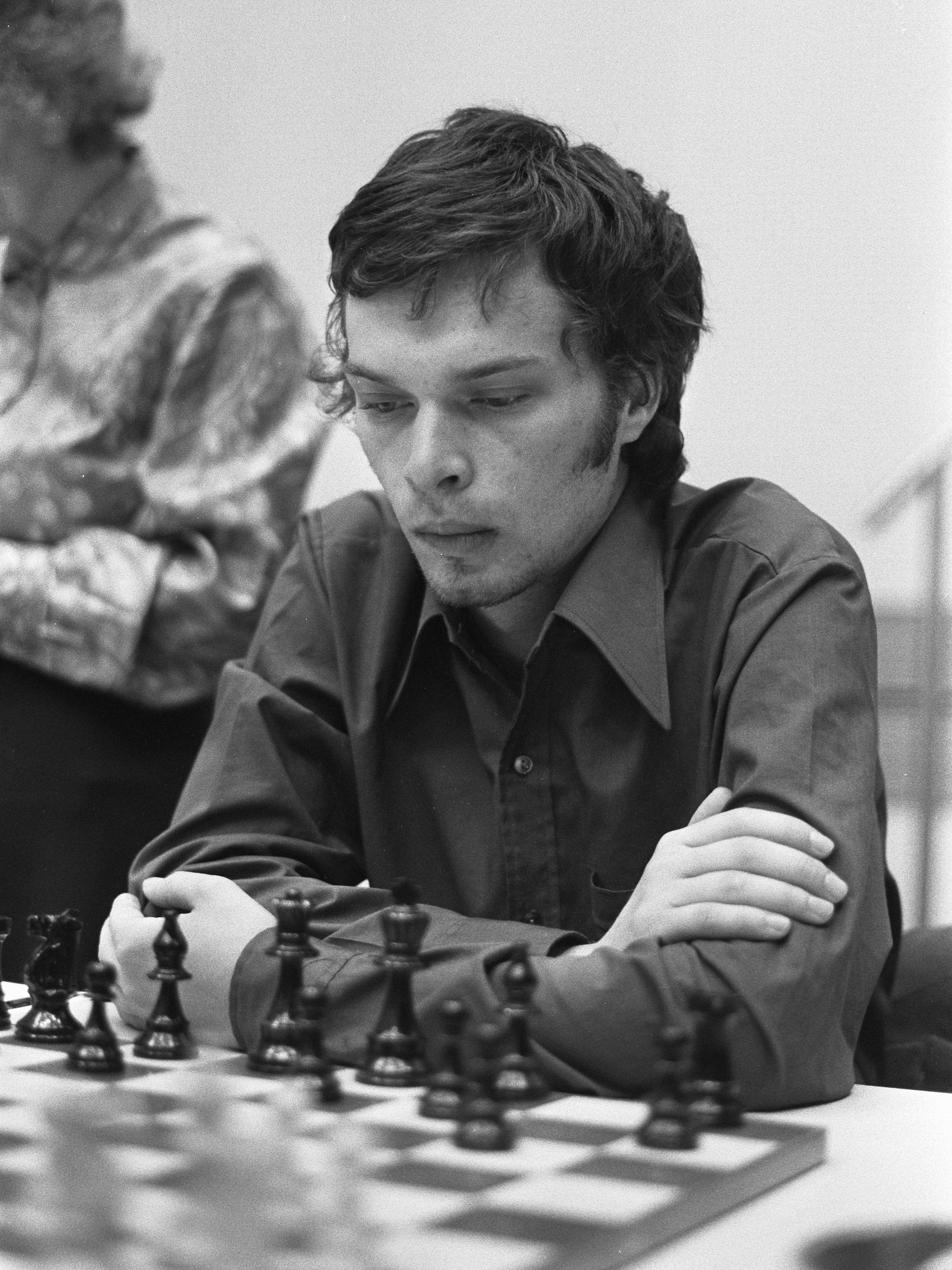
- Sax in 1973

Personal information
- Born: 18 June 1951 Budapest, Hungary
- Died: 25 January 2014 (aged 62)

Chess career
- Country: Hungary
- Title: Grandmaster (1974)
- Peak rating: 2610 (January 1988)
- Peak ranking: No. 12 (January 1989)

Gyula Sax (18 June 1951 – 25 January 2014) was a Hungarian chess grandmaster and international arbiter.

== Chess career ==
Sax was born on 18 June 1951 in Budapest, Hungary. In 1972, he won the European Junior Chess Championship in Groningen. He was awarded the IM title in 1972 and the GM title in 1974. He was the Hungarian Chess Champion in 1976 and (jointly) 1977.

Sax placed first at Rovinj–Zagreb 1975, Vinkovci 1976, Las Palmas Invitation (together with Vladimir Tukmakov) 1978, IBM international chess tournament 1979 (together with Vlastimil Hort), and Wijk aan Zee 1989 (shared in a four-way tie). He won the 1978 Canadian Open Chess Championship and the strong Lugano Open in 1984.

Sax participated twice in a row in the Candidates Tournament – after qualifying at the Subotica Interzonal in 1987 and at the Manila Interzonal in 1990 respectively – but was eliminated in the Candidates in 1988 by Nigel Short (+0=3-2) and in 1991, after 'extra time', by the then sixty-year-old Viktor Korchnoi (+1=6-1; +0=1-1 rapid chess). Sax's highest Elo rating was 2610 in January 1988 and again in January 1989; his best world ranking was position 12 shared, in the half-year-list of January-to-June 1989.

== Death and legacy ==
Sax died of a heart attack on 25 January 2014, at the age of 62. He reportedly lived in seclusion in the last two decades of his life. Judit Polgár paid tribute to him shortly after his death:

Gyula Sax was one of the greatest chess players of Hungary. He was the first GM who treated me as a fellow chess player when I was only 9 years old. He was ready to analyze positions with me, and shared ideas and by doing so he gave me a lot of self-confidence. Later I met him in many different occasions, we played against each other, and played in the national team together. He was also an Olympic gold medalist and a fantastically energetic attacking player!

Sax's funeral was held in Kecskemét on 7 February 2014.

== Notable chess games ==
- Vasily Smyslov vs Gyula Sax, Tilburg 1979, King's Indian, Fianchetto Variation (A49), 0-1. A close and symmetrical endgame is won by Sax against endgame master and former world champion Smyslov.
