= Rafael Vaganian =

Armenian chess grandmaster (born 1951)

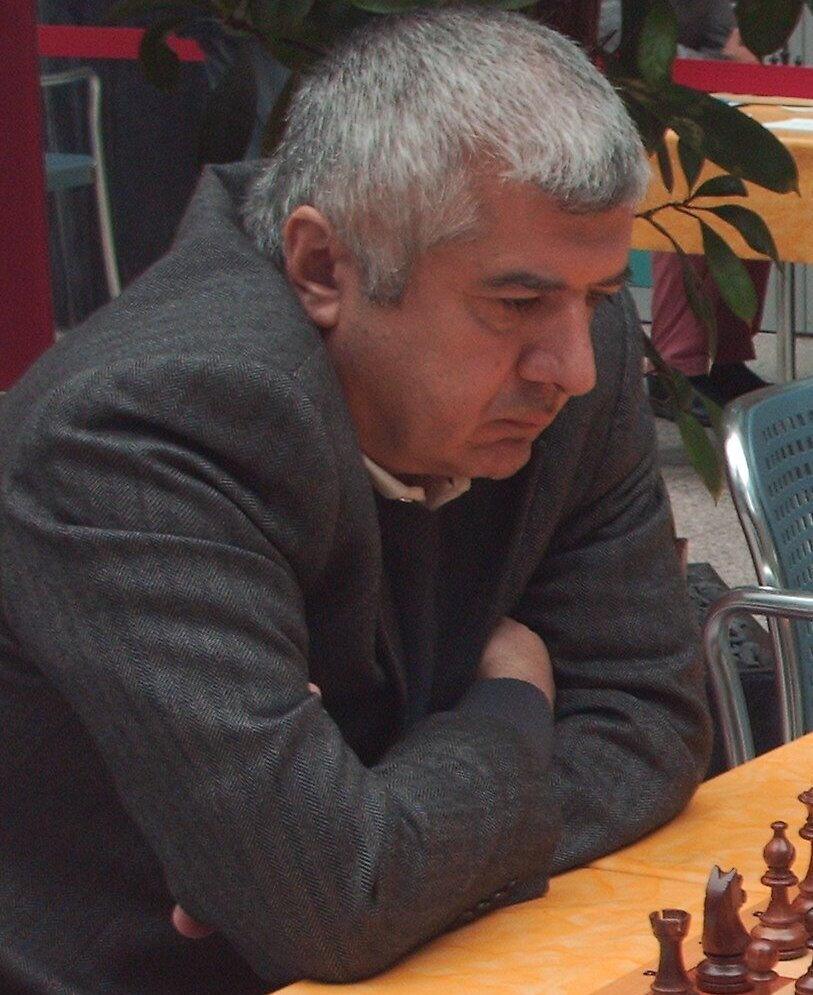

Personal information
- Born: Rafael Artemovich Vaganian; 15 October 1951 (age 74) Yerevan, Armenian SSR, Soviet Union

Chess career
- Country: Soviet Union → Armenia
- Title: Grandmaster (1971)
- FIDE rating: 2442 (July 2026)
- Peak rating: 2670 (January 2005)
- Peak ranking: No. 4 (January 1985)

Rafael Artemovich Vaganian (Armenian: Ռաֆայել Արտյոմի Վահանյան, Rrafayel Artyomi Vahanyan, Russian: Рафаэль Артёмович Ваганян, Rafael Artemovich Vaganyan; born 15 October 1951) is an Armenian chess player holding the title of grandmaster (GM). He was Soviet champion in 1989.

== Chess career ==
Vaganian achieved his Grandmaster title in 1971, at the age of 19. This followed an excellent result at the Vrnjacka Banja tournament the same year, where he took first place ahead of Leonid Stein and Ljubomir Ljubojević. It was also the year that he finished fourth at the World Junior Chess Championship, a competition won by the Swiss player Werner Hug.

His international tournament record includes victories at Kragujevac 1974, São Paulo 1977, Kirovakan 1978, Las Palmas 1979, Manila 1981, Hastings 1982/83, Biel 1985 (the Interzonal), Leningrad 1987, Toronto 1990 and Ter Apel 1992. At Moscow 1982 and Tallinn 1983, he shared first place with Mikhail Tal and at Næstved 1985 with Walter Browne and Bent Larsen. He won the Reggio Emilia chess tournament twice, on the occasions of the 35th edition (1992/93) and the 37th edition (1994/95).

At Odessa in 1989, he won the 56th Soviet Championship on his 38th birthday. In previous attempts, he had shared third place in Leningrad 1974 and Moscow 1983, whilst finishing second at his hometown of Yerevan in 1975.

He was twice a world championship candidate, losing out to Andrei Sokolov in 1986 and to Lajos Portisch in 1988. It is estimated that he has won in excess of thirty tournaments in all, and in 2004, tied for first place in the Moscow's Aeroflot Open, one of Russia's premier events.

In January 2005, his Elo rating briefly reached a 21st-century high at 2670, putting him back into the world's top 50, despite being in his mid-fifties. In 2019 Vaganian won the World Seniors' Championship in Bucharest, in the 65+ age category. In recent years, Vaganian cut down on his tournament appearances and instead, he coaches Junior players in Armenia. Vaganian is married to Women's International Master Irina Vaganian.

=== Team competitions ===
Over the years, Vaganian has won many medals in team competition, representing the Soviet Union and then Armenia in the Olympiads and European Team Chess Championships. In 1974, he was board one for the USSR team at the World Student Team Championship at Teesside, scoring 10/11 and taking the board one prize. Most recently, he took team bronze and individual gold for best performance on board three at the 2004 Calvia Olympiad.

== Playing style ==
In 1985, Alexey Suetin described Vaganian as a player with great natural gifts. Having played with him a number of times, Suetin sensed the Armenian's great powers of intuition: "He has a fine feeling of the dynamics of a chess battle and knows how to intensify the play at the right moment. He does not always calculate variants thoroughly, relying on his natural chess flair." Of Vaganian's volatile ideas at the chessboard, Suetin added: "...The feeling of fear or uncertainty is unknown to him. He is a perpetual optimist, full of ambitious intentions at every stage in every game, with an explosive temperament..."
