= Ljubomir Ljubojević =

Serbian chess grandmaster (born 1950)

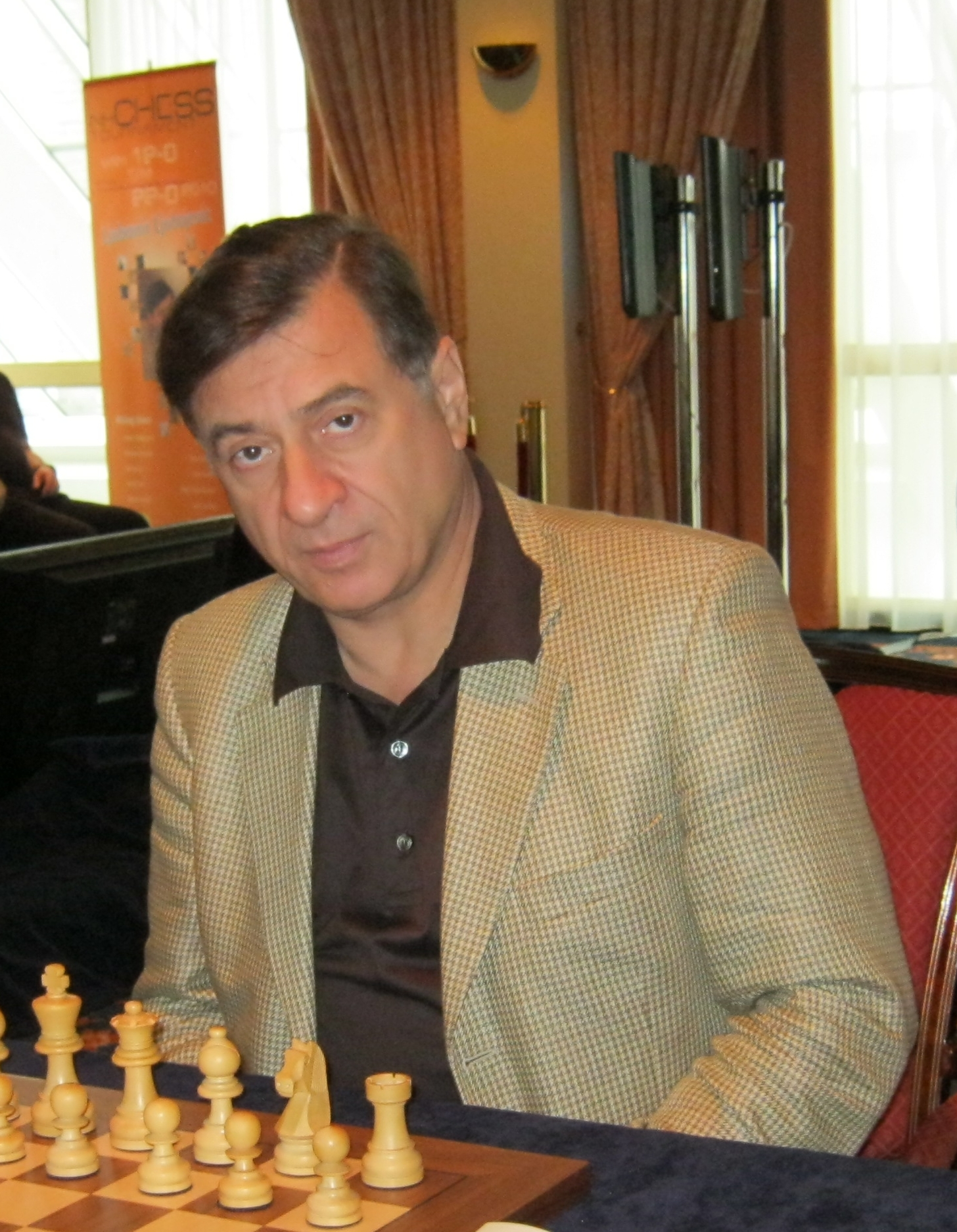
- Ljubojević in 2010

Personal information
- Born: Љубомир Љубојевић; 2 November 1950 (age 76) Titovo Užice, SR Serbia, SFR Yugoslavia

Chess career
- Country: Yugoslavia → Serbia
- Title: Grandmaster (1971)
- FIDE rating: 2571 (November 2026)
- Peak rating: 2645 (January 1983)
- Peak ranking: No. 3 (January 1983)

Ljubomir Ljubojević (Serbian Cyrillic: Љубомир Љубојевић; born November 2, 1950) is a Serbian chess grandmaster. He won the Yugoslav Chess Championship in 1977 (tied) and 1982.

== Life and career ==
Ljubojević was born on 2 November 1950 in Titovo Užice, Yugoslavia (now Užice, Serbia). He was awarded the International Master (IM) title in 1970 and the Grandmaster (GM) title in 1971. Ljubojević was Yugoslav champion in 1977 (jointly) and 1982. He won the 1974 Canadian Open Chess Championship. In 1983 he was ranked third in the FIDE Elo rating list, but he never succeeded in reaching the Candidates Tournament stage of the World Championships. This was partly due to unsteadiness and opening experimentation. On his best days, he was a dangerous opponent to anyone; but his lack of consistency prevented him from making a bigger impact on world championship events.

He played for Yugoslavia in twelve Chess Olympiads, nine times on top board, with an overall result of 63.5% (+66−22=75). He won an individual gold medal on third board at Skopje 1972, team silver medal at Nice 1974 and three bronze medals (one individual and two team).

Ljubojević tied for first place with Robert Hübner at Linares 1985 ahead of Jan Timman (world number 3), Rafael Vaganian (4), Lajos Portisch (5), Viktor Korchnoi (7) and Lev Polugaevsky (8). He has defeated almost every top grandmaster active during his career, including world champions Garry Kasparov, Anatoly Karpov, and Viswanathan Anand.

== Tournament victories and medals with the national team ==
Ljubomir Ljubojević
Medal record

Representing Yugoslavia

Men's chess

Olympiad
Bronze medal – third place	1972 Skopje	Open team
Gold medal – first place	1972 Skopje	Individual board 3
Silver medal – second place	1974 Nice	Open team
Bronze medal – third place	1980 Valletta	Open team
Bronze medal – third place	1982 Lucerne	Individual board 1

World Championship
Silver medal – second place	1989 Lucerne	Open team
Bronze medal – third place	1989 Lucerne	Individual board 1

European Championship
Silver medal – second place	1973 Bath	Open team
Gold medal – first place	1973 Bath	Individual board 3
Bronze medal – third place	1977 Moscow	Open team
Silver medal – second place	1983 Plovdiv	Open team
Bronze medal – third place	1983 Plovdiv	Individual board 1

- Palma de Mallorca 1971
- Las Palmas 1974
- Las Palmas 1975
- Manila 1975
- Wijk aan Zee 1976
- São Paulo 1979
- Buenos Aires 1979
- Linares 1985
- Reggio Emilia 1985–86
- Belgrade 1987
- Brussels 1987
- Barcelona 1989
- Reggio Emilia 1990–91

== Notable games ==
- Ljubomir Ljubojevic vs Ulf Andersson, Wijk aan Zee 1976, Sicilian Defense: Paulsen, Bastrikov Variation (B47), 1–0
- Bent Larsen vs Ljubomir Ljubojevic, Milano 1975, Benoni Defense: Classical Variation, Czerniak Defense (A77), 0–1
- Ljubomir Ljubojevic vs Viktor Korchnoi, Linares 1985, French Defense: Winawer, Poisoned Pawn Variation (C18), 1–0
- Ljubomir Ljubojevic vs Anthony Miles, Bugojno 1986, English Opening: General (A10), 1–0
