= List of Webster University alumni =

This is a list of notable Webster University alumni, including both living and deceased individuals.

== Notable alumni ==
- Marvin Abney (b. 1949) – Masters 1982; member of the Rhode Island House of Representatives
- Rich Anderson (b. 1955) – MA 1982; member of the Virginia House of Delegates
- Lloyd James Austin III (b. 1953) – MA 1989; U.S. Secretary of Defense
- Barbara Ballard (b. 1944) – BMeEd 1967; member of the Kansas House of Representatives
- Sheila R. Baxter (b. 1955) – MA 1986; U.S. Army Brigadier General; First female general in the Medical Service Corps

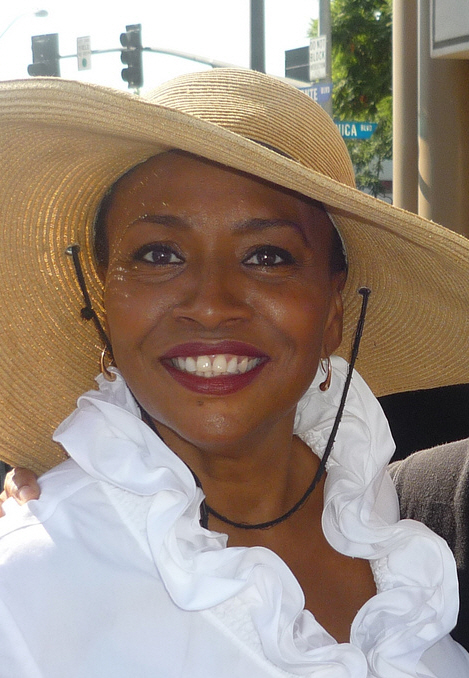
Actress Jenifer Lewis

- Hunter Bell – BFA 1993 (Conservatory of Theatre Arts); Broadway actor and dramatist
- James Black Jr. (b. 1998) – chess player
- John Boccieri (b. 1969) – MA 1992, MPA 1996; former U.S. Congressman
- Erin Bode – jazz musician
- Nikki Boyer (b. 1975) – BA 1997; actress, television host, and singer
- Elvina Ibru, heiress, actress and on-air personality
- Steven A. Boylan (b. 1965) – MA
- Ann Walsh Bradley (b. 1950) – BA 1972; Wisconsin Supreme Court Justice
- Kevin Bratcher
- William Broad – reporter, Pulitzer Prize winner
- Bryan D. Brown – MBA; U.S. Army general and commander of U.S. Special Forces
- Laurie Buckhout – military officer and politician
- Norbert Leo Butz – Tony Award-winning actor

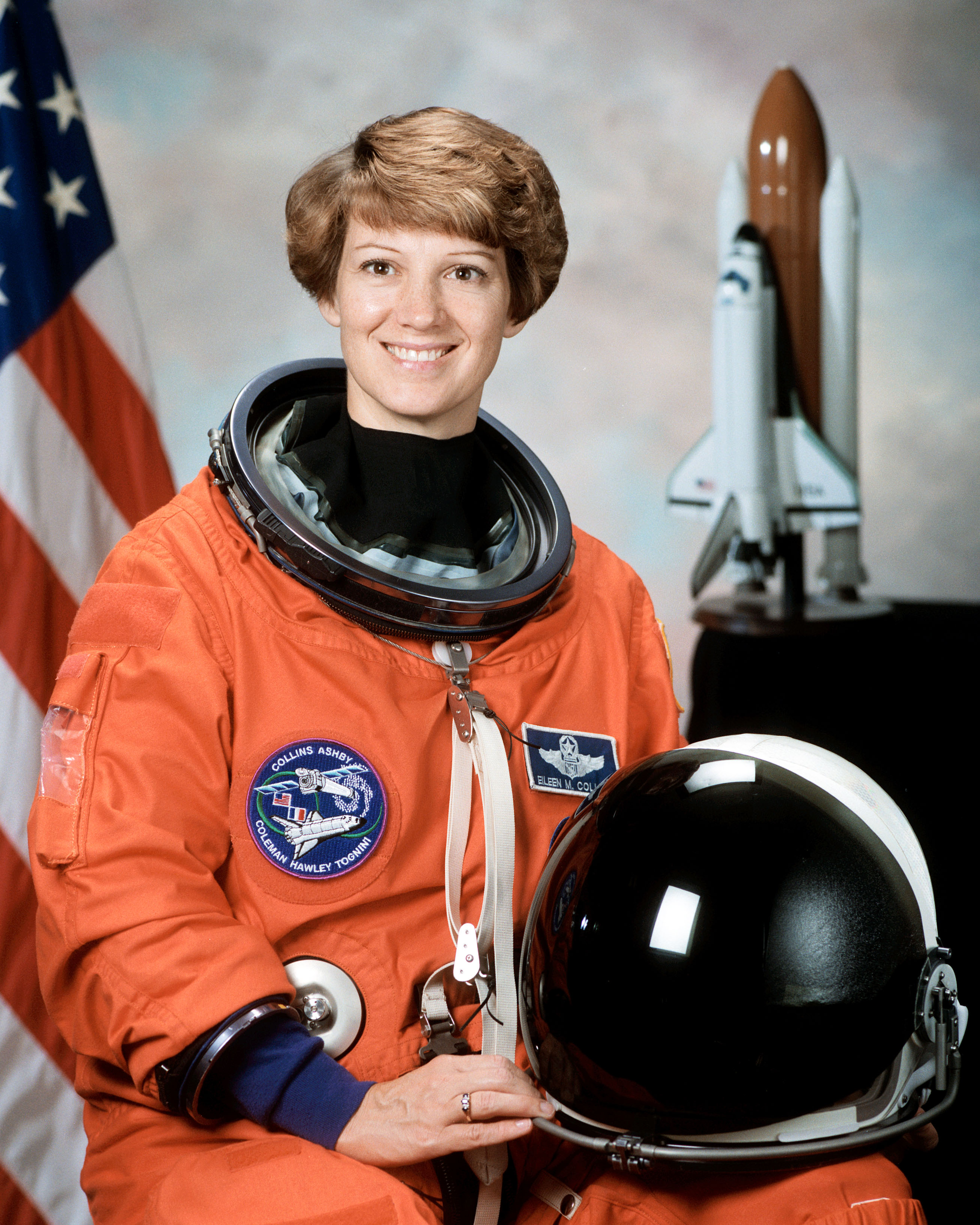
Commander Eileen Collins - First Woman To Command a Mission To Space & First To Pilot a Space Shuttle

- Kevin P. Byrnes – MA 1985; U.S. Army general
- Bruce A. Carlson – MA 1980 – U.S. Air Force general
- Rocky Carroll – actor
- Carrol H. Chandler – MA 1978; U.S. Air Force general; 35th Vice Chief of Staff of the United States Air Force
- Chris Cheek
- Joshua Colas (b. 1998) – chess player and FIDE Master
- Eileen Collins – astronaut, U.S. Air Force colonel (retired)
- John B. Conaway
- Adam Jamal Craig – actor

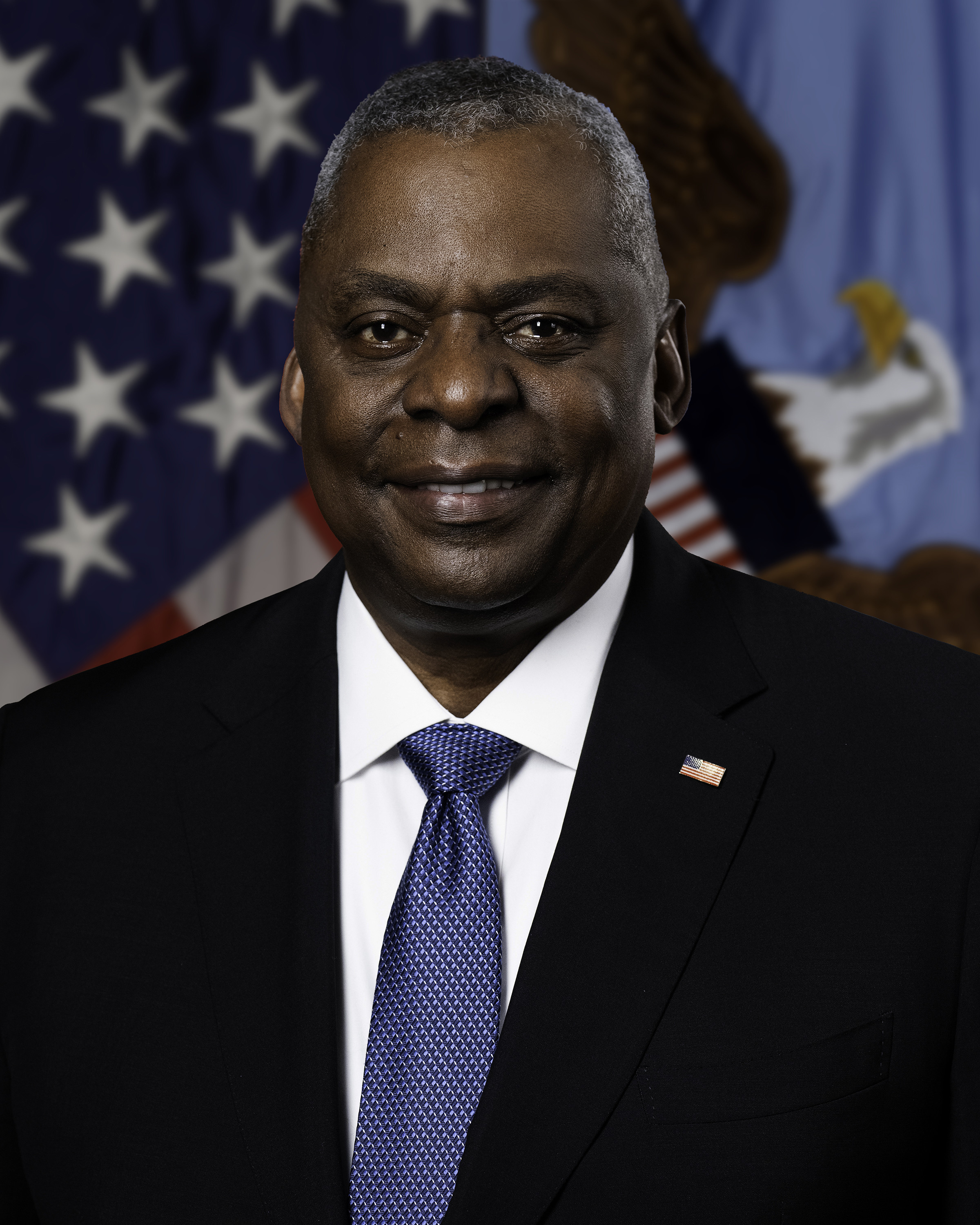
Lloyd James Austin III- U.S. Secretary of Defense

- Joseph V. Cuffari – Inspector General of the Department of Homeland Security
- John Cusick
- Daria Dolan
- Jonathan Dolan

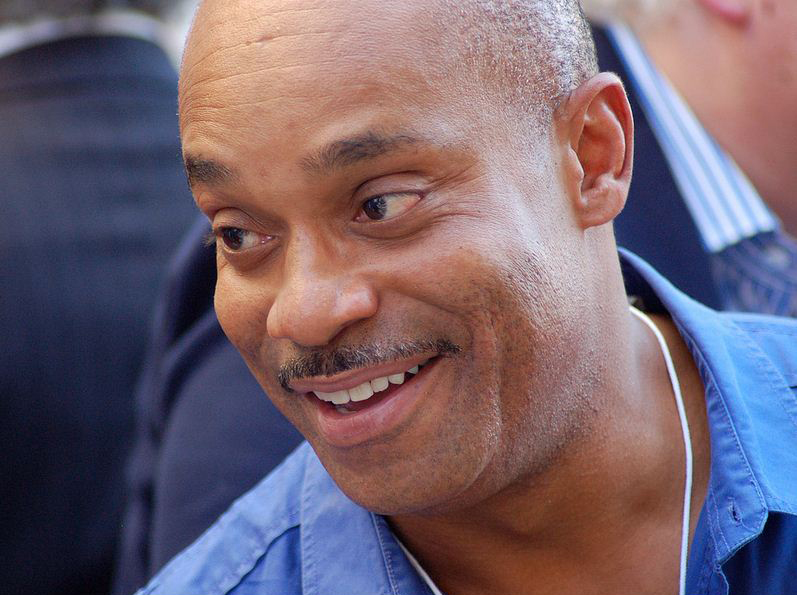
Actor Rocky Carroll

- Debi Doss
- Sam Dotson – former Metropolitan Police Department, City of St. Louis, Police Commissioner St. Louis, Missouri 2013–2017
- Michele Dunaway
- Mary Alice Dwyer-Dobbin – television producer
- Kevin Earley – actor
- Julie Ann Emery – actress
- Nichi Farnham
- Steven E. Foster – U.S. Air National Guard Major General
- Dan Gilvezan
- Olivia Gude – art educator
- Charles Guenther
- Sidney M. Gutierrez – astronaut

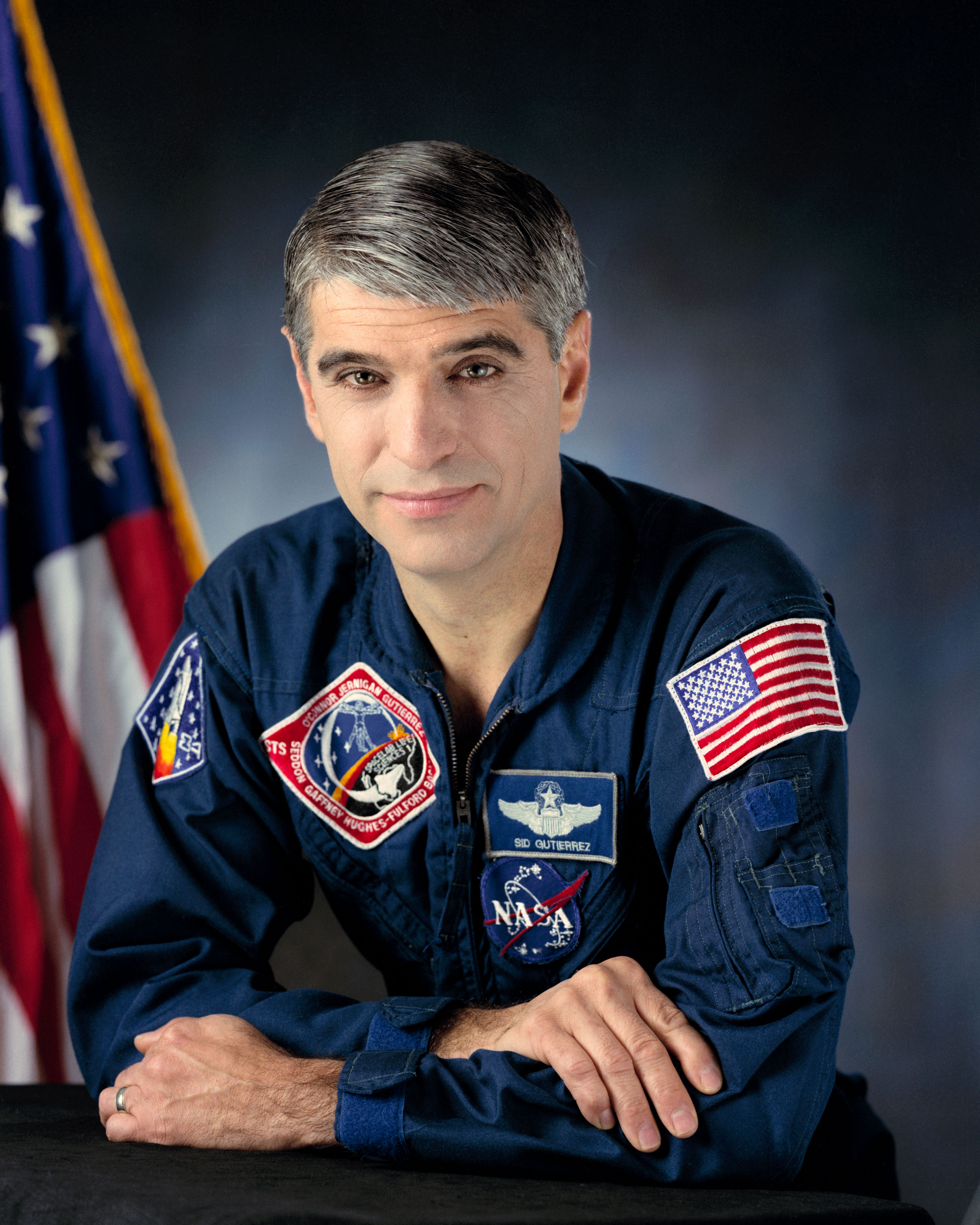
Astronaut Sidney M. Gutierrez

- Aram Hakobyan – chess player and Grandmaster
- Clarence Harmon – former St Louis Mayor and Police Commissioner St. Louis, Missouri
- Bernie Herpin
- Phyllis Huffman
- Charlie Huggins
- Ramlan Ibrahim – Malaysian diplomat
- Jane Ellen Ibur – poet and arts educator; recipient of the Loretto Award from Webster University
- Kevin J. Jacobsen
- Jennifer Johnson Cano
- Neal Jones
- Timothy J. Kadavy – United States Army Major General; former Adjutant General of the Nebraska National Guard; Director of the Army National Guard
- Matt Kindt – artist and graphic novelist
- R. Alan King
- Jodi Kingsley - actress (Chicago Med, NBC)
- Steve Kirby – jazz educator
- Lê Quang Liêm – chess player and Grandmaster
- Jenifer Lewis – actress
- Dana Loesch
- Kevin J. Manning
- Marsha Mason – actress, Academy Award nominee. 2x Golden Globe award winner.
- Sandra Mansour – fashion designer
- Kathleen Mazzarella
- Imaan Sulaiman-Ibrahim – Director-General of NAPTIP
- Danny McCarthy – Broadway, TV and film actor
- Ruth McClendon – African-American politician from San Antonio, Texas
- Craig R. McKinley – MA 1979; U.S. Air Force general
- Patricia McKissack – author of children's literature
- Allen Meadors

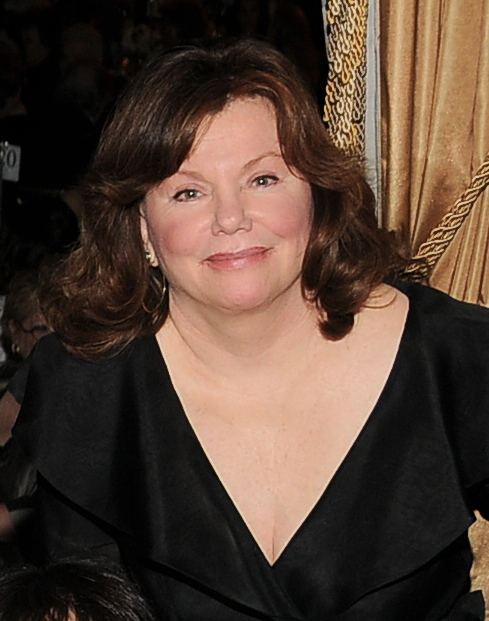
Actress Marsha Mason

- Jerry Mitchell – actor, Tony Award winner
- Joe Mokwa – Former Metropolitan Police Department, City of St. Louis Police Commissioner, St. Louis, Missouri, 2001–2008
- Keith W. Nolan – Vietnam War historian
- Richard Ojeda - Bronze Star awardee, United States Army veteran of Afghan and Iraq conflicts, West Virginia senator
- Vance Peterson – judge
- Tony Richardson – NFL football player
- Rob Riggle – actor, The Daily Show and Saturday Night Live
- James C. Riley – US Army lieutenant general, M.A., 1987
- Ray Robson – chess player and Grandmaster
- Eric Rosen - chess player and International Master
- Roderick Royal – Mayor of Birmingham, Alabama
- Jeffrey D. Sams – actor

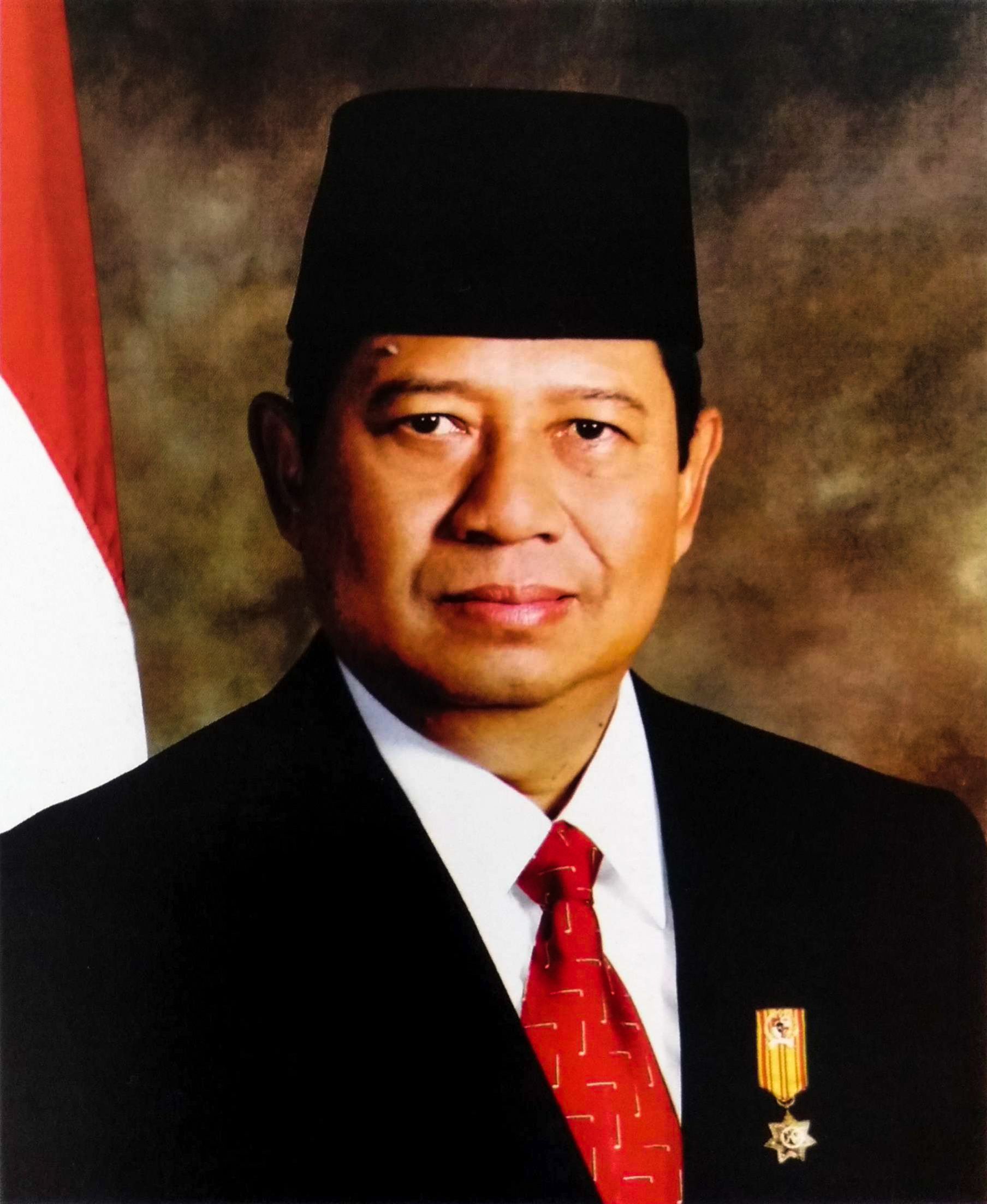
Former Indonesian President Susilo Bambang Yudhoyono

- Eric Schaefer – author and professor at Emerson College
- Sister Lory Schaff – leader in adult literacy education
- Steven A. Schaick – U.S. Air Force general, Deputy Chief of Chaplains
- Winfield W. Scott III – MA 1983; U.S. Air Force general
- Scott Sharp MA, politician
- Phil Short – member of the Louisiana State Senate (1996–99)
- Lara Smith - Managing Director, Dad's Garage Theatre Company in Atlanta, GA
- Tammy Smith – first openly gay flag officer in the U.S. Army
- Dana Snyder – actor
- Gary D. Speer – MA 1982, U.S. Army lieutenant general
- Antonio Taguba – U.S. Army general
- Roelof van Laar – MBA 2014; Dutch politician, member of the Labour Party
- Mark A. Welsh – Chief of Staff, U.S. Air Force
- Justus Williams (b. 1998) – chess player and International Master
- Phyllis J. Wilson – MS; President of the Military Women's Memorial and 5th Command Chief Warrant Officer of the US Army Reserve
- Donald C. Wurster – MA 1983; U.S. Air Force general
- James C. Yarbrough – MA 1991; U.S. Army general
- Kristeen Young – musical performer, pianist
- Susilo Bambang Yudhoyono – MA 2004; former president of Indonesia
- John Zorn – attended two years; jazz musician
- Priyadharshan Kannappan - Chess GrandMaster and Founder of Chess Gaja Private Limited
- Agus Harimurti Yudhoyono – MA 2015; Coordinating Minister for Infrastructure and Regional Development of Indonesia
- Muhammad Iftitah Sulaiman Suryanagara – MA 2016; Minister of Transmigration of Indonesia
