= Chess as mental training =

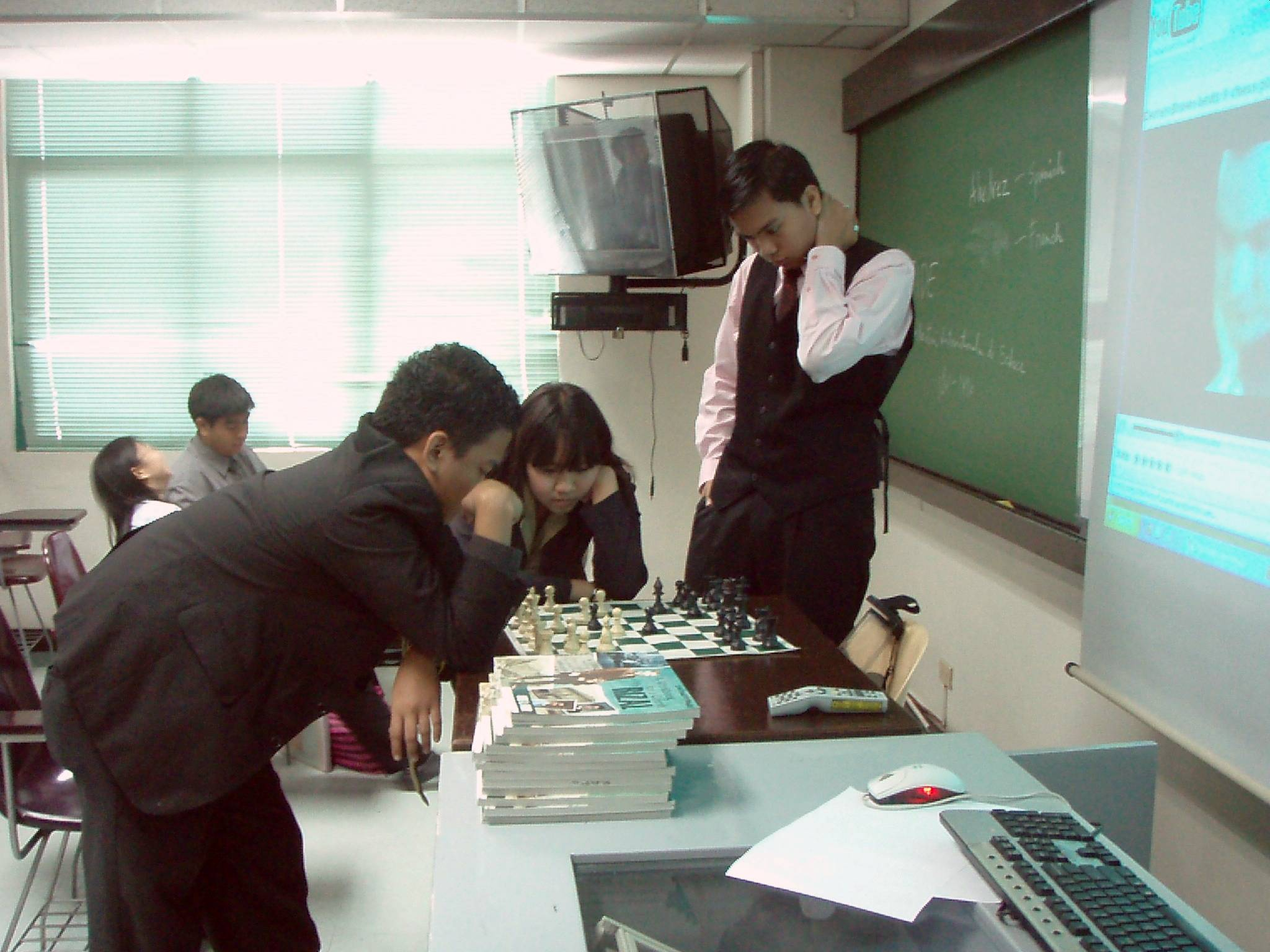
Students of the Angelo King International Center, De La Salle-College of Saint Benilde in Manila learning and playing chess tactics as mental training.

There are efforts to use the game of chess as a tool to aid the intellectual development of young people. Chess is significant in cognitive psychology and artificial intelligence (AI) studies, because it represents the domain in which expert performance has been most intensively studied and measured.

New York–based Chess-In-The-Schools, Inc. has been active in the public school system in the city since 1986. It currently reaches more than 30,000 students annually. America's Foundation for Chess has initiated programs in partnership with local school districts in several U.S. cities, including Seattle, San Diego, Philadelphia, and Tampa. The Chess'n Math Association promotes chess at the scholastic level in Canada. Chess for Success is a program for at-risk schools in Oregon. Since 1991, the U.S. Chess Center in Washington, D.C. teaches chess to children, especially those in the inner city, "as a means of improving their academic and social skills."

== Research ==
Research has shown that chess can have a positive impact on meta-cognitive ability and mathematical problem-solving in children, which is why several local governments, schools, and student organizations all over the world are implementing chess programs.

There are a number of experiments that suggest that learning and playing chess aids the mind. The Grandmaster Eugene Torre Chess Institute in the Philippines, the United States Chess Federation's chess research bibliography, and English educational consultant Tony Buzan's Brain Foundation, among others, continuously collect such experimental results. The advent of chess software that automatically record and analyze the moves of each player in each game and can tirelessly play with human players of various levels, further helped in giving new directions to experimental designs on chess as mental training.

== History ==
As early as 1779 Benjamin Franklin, in his article The morals of chess, advocated such a view, saying:

The Game of Chess is not merely an idle amusement; several very valuable qualities of the mind, useful in the course of human life, are to be acquired and strengthened by it, so as to become habits ready on all occasions; for life is a kind of Chess, in which we have often points to gain, and competitors or adversaries to contend with, and in which there is a vast variety of good and ill events, that are, in some degree, the effect of prudence, or the want of it. By playing at Chess then, we may learn:

1st, Foresight, which looks a little into futurity, and considers the consequences that may attend an action ...

2nd, Circumspection, which surveys the whole Chess-board, or scene of action: - the relation of the several Pieces, and their situations; ...

3rd, Caution, not to make our moves too hastily...

Alfred Binet demonstrated in the late 19th century that good chess players have superior memory and imagination. Adriaan de Groot concurred with Alfred Binet that visual memory and visual perception are important attributors and that problem-solving ability is of paramount importance. Thus, since 1972, at the collegiate level, the University of Texas at Dallas and the University of Maryland, Baltimore County both recruit chessplayer-scholars and run scholastic outreach programs in their respective communities.

== Physiological effects ==
A widely cited claim holds that chess grandmasters can burn up to 6,000 calories per day during tournaments and experience blood pressure and breathing rates comparable to those of marathon runners. These claims were popularized by Robert Sapolsky, a Stanford neuroendocrinologist, who discussed the physiological stress of competitive chess in his book Why Zebras Don't Get Ulcers (1994). A 2019 ESPN feature article brought these claims to a mass audience, reporting that grandmasters could burn 6,000 calories a day "just thinking" and routinely lost 10–12 pounds over the course of multi-day tournaments. The story was subsequently amplified by outlets including CNBC, Men's Health, GQ, and The Joe Rogan Experience.

However, the underlying evidence for these claims has been found to be substantially weaker than reported. The primary source is a 1975 doctoral thesis by Harold G. Leedy at Temple University, supervised by Lawrence J. DuBeck, which used impedance pneumography to measure breathing rates and chest muscle contractions in 11 amateur chess players rated 1329–1921 on the USCF scale—far below the 2500+ rating required for grandmaster status. The study found that breathing rates momentarily peaked above 40 breaths per minute compared to a resting rate of roughly 14, representing a brief maximum—not a sustained tripling. The average breathing rate increase during games was only 14–18%. Critically, the study measured chest movement rather than oxygen consumption or metabolic rate, making any inference about caloric expenditure scientifically unsupported.

The 6,000-calorie figure appears to have been derived by multiplying a presumed tripling of breathing rate by a baseline daily energy expenditure of roughly 2,000 calories—an extrapolation that DuBeck himself has stated he never made. Statistician Andrew Gelman has described the claim as an example of how striking but poorly sourced numbers propagate through popular media without scrutiny. More modest data from heart-rate monitor manufacturer Polar suggested that chess player Mikhail Antipov burned approximately 560 calories over two hours of play during the 2018 Chess Olympiad—elevated compared to sedentary activity but far below the viral claims.
