= Woodhull Medical Center =

- NYC Health + Hospitals
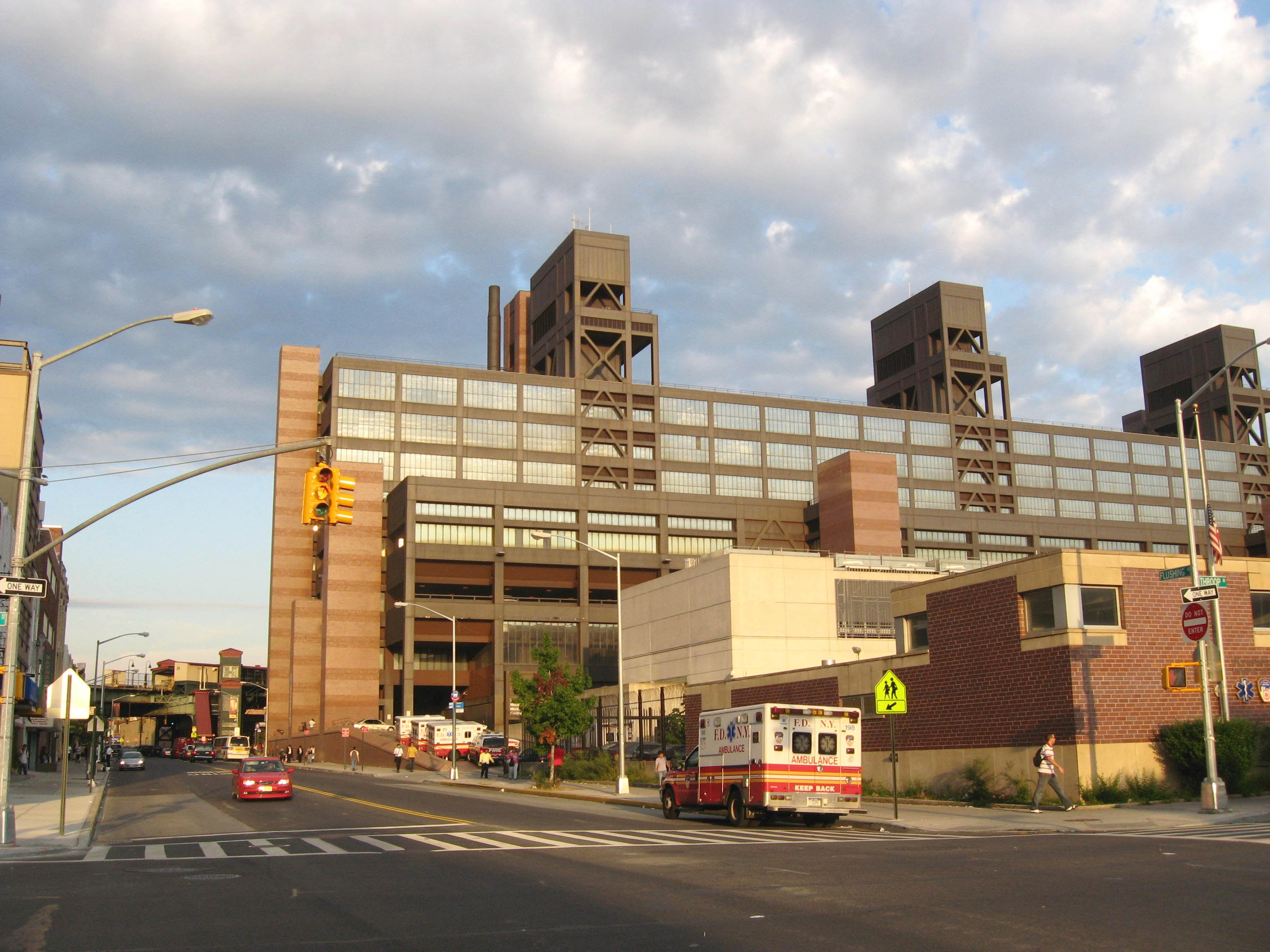
- Flushing Avenue side

Geography
- Location: 760 Broadway, Brooklyn, New York City, New York, United States
- Coordinates: 40°41′58″N 73°56′33″W

Organization
- Care system: Public
- Type: Specialist and General
- Affiliated university: NYU Langone Medical Center
- Network: New York City Health and Hospitals Corporation

Services
- Beds: 323

History
- Founded: 1982

Links
- Website: www.nychealthandhospitals.org/woodhull/
- Lists: Hospitals in New York State
- Other links: Hospitals in Brooklyn

Woodhull Medical Center, branded as NYC Health + Hospitals/Woodhull, is a health care system located in the Bedford–Stuyvesant section of Brooklyn, New York City, United States. Its focus is on preventing disease and promoting healthy lifestyles in the community of North Brooklyn through its fifteen centers. Woodhull Medical and Mental Health Center falls administratively under New York City Health and Hospitals Corporation. As of 2025, the CEO is Sandra Sneed.

== History ==
Mayor John V. Lindsay and Governor Nelson Rockefeller proposed Woodhull hospital in 1967 as a modern facility with single-occupancy patient rooms and amenities more often found in private hospitals at a cost of $85 million. It was intended to provide more accessible and personal health care to the surrounding communities of Williamsburg, Fort Greene, Bushwick, Greenpoint, and Bedford-Stuyvesant. Ground was broken in 1970 but due to budget issues the hospital was not opened until 1982, costing $308 million. The emergency room was designed to accommodate 65,000 patients per year. The hospital was named after Richard M. Woodhull, the original landowner of the immediate area and credited with having laid out the Village of Williamsburg into an actual city. The name was proposed by middle school student Victor Morales of Intermediate School 318.

In 2017, Woodhull became the first hospital in Brooklyn to receive the baby-friendly designation from Baby-Friendly USA, an initiative between the World Health Organization (WHO) and the United Nations Children's Fund (UNICEF).

In 2018, the hospital's emergency room served nearly 110,000 patients and received $5 million in capital funds to add 5,000 square feet.

== Architecture ==
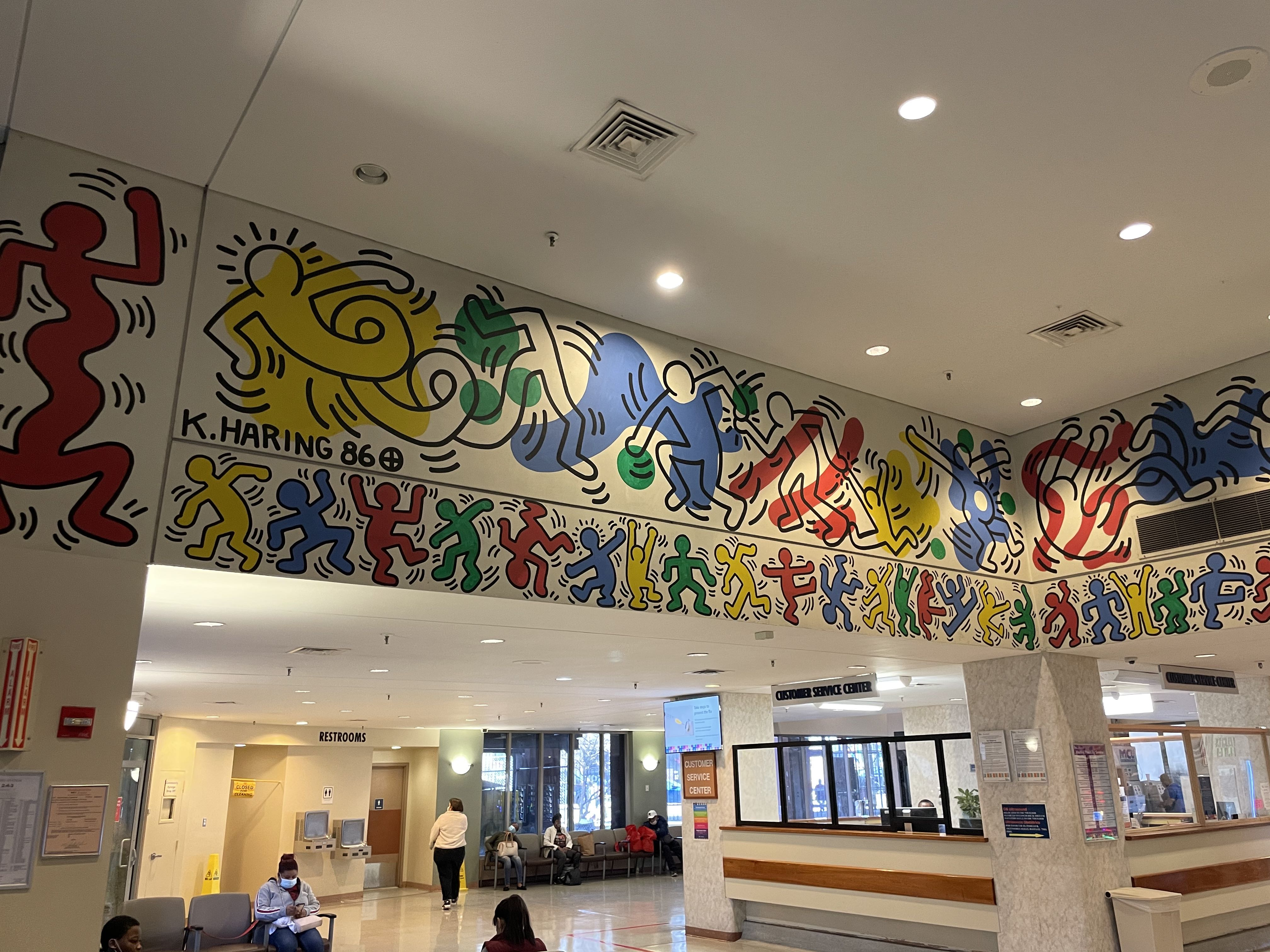
Main Lobby of the hospital with Keith Haring's public mural.

The building was designed by Kallmann & McKinnell in the Brutalist architecture style in the 1960s. It employs a structural framework with a machinist aesthetic quality. The interior is organized by employing the Kaiser corridor system by which patient rooms are arranged along a central corridor for healthcare personnel while visitor corridors flank the perimeter and light passes through glazing into patient rooms.

In 1986, artist Keith Haring created public murals in the lobby and ambulatory care department.

== Controversies ==
Woodhull Hospital was designed to provide every patient with a private room, resulting in many patients being transferred due to lack of space. 60% of rooms became shared to reduce the number of patients being transferred. There were also problems with security, including hallways being too narrow for police to patrol, and stairways leading outside the hospital.

In 1992, Woodhull's accreditation was revoked by the Joint Commission on Accreditation of Healthcare Organizations after concluding that it did not review enough surgical procedures to detect unnecessary surgery and mishaps. Prior to the inspection, administrators were accused of rewriting critical internal analyses of patient care. Later that year, Woodhull was granted full accreditation after New York City's Health and Hospitals Corporation appealed that decision and corrected most of its deficiencies. By 2002, Woodhull had completely reversed its poor inspection findings of the 1990s, receiving the highest scores assigned to any hospital, public or private, and fully complying with standards for quality patient care and safety. An amateur documentary about the impatience and frustrations felt by the community was made in 1981.

== Programs ==
Woodhull has a program to address childhood asthma, which is prevalent in Brooklyn. It has a partnership with local schools and the North Brooklyn Asthma Action Alliance. Woodhull's Paul Poroski Family Center has been designated an AIDS Center by New York State. The center has the following special subdivisions: AIDS Center; Behavioral Health; Chronic Care Management; Asthma Care; Diabetes Care; Level III Perinatal Center; SAFE (Sexual Assault Forensic Examiner) SART (Sexual Assault Response Teams) Center; Women's Health.
