= Korley =

Korley is a surname. Notable people with the surname include:

- Kassa Korley (born 1993), American-Danish chess player
- LaShanda Korley, American material scientist
