= Alex Sherzer =

American chess grandmaster and medical doctor (1971–2022)

Personal information
- Born: February 1, 1971 Fallston, Maryland, U.S.
- Died: December 4, 2022 (aged 51) Bonita Springs, Florida, U.S.

Chess career
- Country: United States
- Title: Grandmaster (1993)
- Peak rating: 2504 (July 2004)

Alexander Ian Sherzer (February 1, 1971 – December 4, 2022) was an American chess grandmaster and medical doctor.

== Chess career ==
Sherzer was active during the late 1980s to early 1990s. He was the U.S. Junior Champion in 1991.

Sherzer became an International Master (IM) in 1989 and awarded the International Chess Grandmaster (GM) title in 1993. In 1986, he won the US Cadet Championship Under 16. He won the invitational US Junior Championship twice, in 1989 and 1991. Sherzer won 2nd place at the U-18 World Championship.

Sherzer shared 2nd place with Boris Gulko behind Patrick Wolff at the United States Championship in 1992.

Sherzer won against many grandmasters in his chess career including victory versus Viswanathan Anand in Philadelphia, 1987. Alex was famous for his heavy preparation of the Berlin Defence of the Ruy Lopez.

Online in 2021, at the US Chess Center Dr. Sherzer talked about his chess experiences, including his friendship with the Polgar sisters and meeting Bobby Fischer.

== Personal life ==
In the late 90s Sherzer pursued a medical degree at Semmelweis University in Budapest, Hungary, where he had befriended the Polgar sisters (Susan, Sofia, and Judit), each of whom was a renowned chess player; Susan was Women's World Champion. The Polgar household was then a gathering place for famous chess players, including Viswanathan Anand and Bobby Fischer. Through the introduction of a family friend and notable Washington DC attorney Julius Kaplan, Sherzer became an unwitting participant in an hysterical effort to bring Bobby Fischer, then an emigre, legally back to the United States. Kaplan succeeded in brokering a potential deal with the US State Department, though Fischer's racism and erratic demands prevented its fruition. The episode is recounted in Julius Kaplan's memoir Secrets and Suspense, International Law Stories (Academica Press, 2018). The following year, Sherzer began attending UMBC on a chess scholarship, taking courses in emergency health science.

In May 2003, while driving to Shreveport, Louisiana to begin a hospital internship, he was arrested in Mobile, Alabama for allegedly attempting to solicit sex from a 15-year-old-girl he met on the Internet. Judit Polgar testified as a character witness, and sexual invitation started only with FBI entrapment after the minor's mother reported their previous conversations. Although the prosecution managed to suppress over ninety percent of the evidence in Sherzer's favor, the jury produced a full acquittal. The episode is also recounted in the Kaplan memoir.

Sherzer was a practicing medical doctor in Florida and an active volunteer with Doctors Without Borders until his death on December 4, 2022, at the age of 51.
