= Mark Dalton (businessman) =

- Born: Mark Foote Dalton
- Education: Denison University; Vanderbilt University
- Occupations: Chairman & chief executive, Tudor Investment Corporation
- Spouse: Susan Dalton
- Children: Erik Dalton; Kurt Dalton; Chris Dalton

Mark Dalton is an American chief executive and philanthropist. He serves as the chairman and chief executive of the Tudor Investment Corporation.

== Early life ==
Mark Dalton grew up in Detroit, Michigan, and Dayton, Ohio. He graduated from Denison University in 1972 and received a JD from Vanderbilt University School of Law in 1975.

== Career ==
Dalton worked as an attorney for Sullivan & Cromwell in New York City, then served as the chief financial officer for Kidder, Peabody & Co. from 1979 to 1988. In 1988, he joined the Tudor Investment Corporation, and he currently serves as its co-chairman and chief executive officer. Dalton is also the chief executive of Second Management LLC and the sole general partner at D.F. Partners.

Dalton serves on the boards of directors of Progenics Pharmaceuticals and the Cathay Investment Fund. He is a member of Advisory Board at Shah Capital Partners.

== Philanthropy ==
Dalton served as the chairman of the board of trustees of Denison University from 2003 to 2009. He was the chairman of the board of trustees of Vanderbilt University, from 2011 to 2017.

Dalton serves as chairman of the Sheridan Arts Foundation in Telluride, Colorado. He is also a member of the board of directors of the Telluride Foundation and the Buoniconti Fund to Cure Paralysis. Additionally, he is a board member of America's Foundation for Chess. Additionally, together with his wife, he has donated more than US$20,000 to the American Hospital of Paris in Neuilly-sur-Seine.

== Personal life ==
He is married to Susan Dalton, a philanthropist. They have three sons: Erik, Kurt and Chris.
