= Kassa Korley =

American-Danish chess player (born 1993)

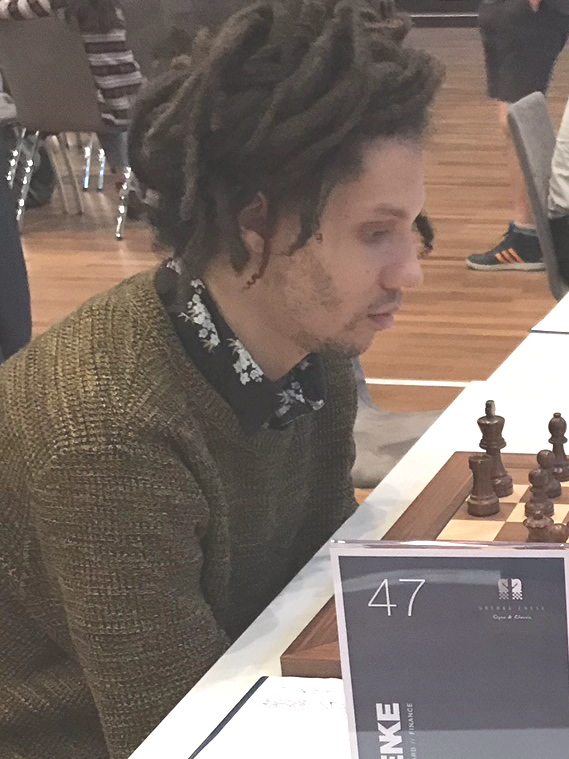
- Korley in 2019

Personal information
- Born: 20 May 1993 (age 33) Harlem, New York

Chess career
- Country: United States (until 2014); Denmark (since 2014)
- Title: International Master (2014)
- FIDE rating: 2418 (October 2026)
- Peak rating: 2468 (May 2019)

Kassa Martei Korley (born 20 May 1993) is an American-Danish chess player who holds the title of International Master (IM).

== Biography ==
At age 15, he became the youngest African American to earn the US Chess Federation (USCF) title of National Master (NM), a record since surpassed by Justus Williams and then Joshua Colas. Korley switched federations from the United States to Denmark in 2014 and has triple citizenship through Ghana as well. He began playing chess at age five and never had a formal instructor. Korley became a FIDE Master (FM) in 2010 and an International Master in 2014. He has two Grandmaster (GM) norms, which he earned in 2018 at the Charlotte Chess Festival and in 2019 at the Xtracon Open in Copenhagen. Korley resides primarily in New York City, but also splits his time living with family in Denmark. He attended Duke University and worked at Codecademy after graduating, ultimately leaving in 2019 to focus on becoming a Grandmaster.

Korley currently works for Chess.com as a match commentator.
