= Brooklyn Castle =

- Theatrical release poster
- Directed by: Katie Dellamaggiore
- Produced by: Katie Dellamaggiore; Nelson Dellamaggiore; Brian Schulz
- Starring: Rochelle Ballantyne; Justus Williams; James Black, Jr.
- Cinematography: Brian Schulz
- Edited by: Nelson Dellamaggiore
- Music by: B. Satz
- Distributed by: Producers Distribution Agency
- Release dates: March 11, 2012 (South by Southwest Film Festival); October 19, 2012 (United States)
- Running time: 101 minutes
- Country: United States
- Language: English

Brooklyn Castle (2012) is a documentary film about Intermediate School 318, an inner-city public school in Brooklyn, New York. Where an after-school chess program, having both dedicated educators and a supportive community, has triumphed over deep budget cuts to build the most winning junior high school chess team in the country, and the first middle school team to win the United States Chess Federation's national high school championship. The film follows five of the school's chess team members for one year, from April 2009 to June 2010, and documents their challenges and triumphs both on and off the chessboard.

Remake rights have been acquired by Sony Pictures and producer Scott Rudin. Rudin's other works include co-producing the acclaimed film Searching for Bobby Fischer (1993).

Brooklyn Castle premiered at the South by Southwest (SXSW) film festival on March 11, 2012. Over the next several months it was shown during at least eleven other film festivals winning a total of three festival awards to date. The film was released to a limited number of U.S. theaters on October 19, 2012. Brooklyn Castle was aired on the PBS series POV on October 7, 2013.

== Reception ==
Currently, the film has a rating of 96% on Rotten Tomatoes, based on 45 reviews and an average score of 7.6/10.
