= Scott Oki =

Former senior vice-president of sales and marketing for Microsoft

Scott D. Oki
- Born: October 5, 1948 (age 78); Seattle, Washington, USA
- Education: University of Colorado Colorado Springs; University of Washington (BA, MBA)
- Occupations: Former Senior Vice-President of Sales and Marketing at Microsoft
- Known for: Building Microsoft's international operations
- Spouse: Laurie Oki

Scott D. Oki (born October 5, 1948, in Seattle, Washington) is a former senior vice-president of sales and marketing for Microsoft who conceived and built Microsoft's international operations. Oki also played a crucial role in Microsoft's rapid domestic growth during the 1980s.

== Early life ==
Oki was a third generation Japanese-American raised by a family that some sources described as very traditional in outlook. Oki's father was a postal worker while his mother worked as a secretary and the family often struggled financially so they had to work tying fish flies to gain additional income.

Oki was in the Boy Scouts of America and earned Eagle Scout. He graduated from Seattle's Franklin High School. He then attended the University of Washington but left after 18 months to join the U.S. Air Force. While in the service he took courses at the University of Colorado Colorado Springs. After he left the service in 1974, he went on to receive a Bachelor of Arts in accounting and information systems and earned an Master of Business Administration the following year. After holding several computer-related jobs (including a stint at Hewlett-Packard), Oki went to work for Microsoft in 1982. During this time, the company only had 200 employees.

== Work at Microsoft ==
When Oki joined Microsoft, he was said to have projected that the international market would represent 50 percent of Microsoft business and he immediately turned it to reality. Oki steadily built Microsoft's international operations, and within two years it was more profitable than Microsoft's domestic operation. International sales exceeded half of the company's revenue. Bill Gates then made him vice president of domestic operation, and within five years, the company's sales rose from $100 million to $1 billion. One of Oki's major contributions to Microsoft's success during that time was convincing Bill Gates and the board of directors to center product development and marketing efforts on Windows instead of OS/2. By the time he retired Oki was overseeing 3,000 employees. Later, he would describe his work at the company with these words: "Microsoft demanded a maniacal work focus: If you were awake, you were expected to be thinking about Microsoft."

== Post-retirement activities ==
When Oki retired in 1992, he reportedly cashed in stock options estimated at $100 million. Instead of retiring full-time, however, Oki spends most of his time working with charities and organizations that he care about. He now runs the non-profit Oki Foundation, owns several golf courses, and serves on dozens of advisory boards and boards of directors for both for-profit and non-profit companies. Oki brought the Seattle Sounders back in 1994 with the intent of putting all profits into the Oki Foundation. Adrian Hanauer took over as managing partner of the Sounders in 2002. Oki is the co-chair of the United Way of King County Campaign Board and co-chair of the Million Dollar Roundtable, Founder and Chairman of the Japanese American Chamber of Commerce, Founder and co-president of the Chief Seattle Council Boy Scout Foundation, co-founder of Sounders For Kids, co-founder of America's Foundation for Chess, co-founder of SeeYourImpact.org and co-founder of Social Venture Partners. He is a past-President of the Board of Regents for the University of Washington and a past Chair of Seattle Children's Hospital Foundation, which he joined upon the invitation of Mary Gates, mother of his former boss. Oki also serves on the national boards for United Way of America, Boys & Girls Clubs of America, Japanese American National Museum, and the U.S. Ski and Snowboard Team Foundation. Scott Oki is a member of the National Executive Board of the Boy Scouts of America, the organization's governing body.

Oki was involved in the Children's Hospital Foundation. Aside from his charitable activities, Oki and his wife, Laurie also founded a company called Nanny & Webster, which sells all-cotton blankets for babies. The couple donates all of the profits to children's charities in Seattle.

Oki, along with Tom Ikeda, is one of the founders of the Densho project, a non-profit organization whose mission is "to preserve and share history of the WWII incarceration of Japanese Americans".

== Oki Golf ==
In 1994, Scott Oki purchased The Golf Club at Echo Falls in Snohomish, Washington. This initial acquisition was the preliminary step toward building what eventually became a portfolio of golf properties known collectively as Oki Golf. This collection has grown to include nine properties comprising eleven championship golf courses, both public and private, spread throughout the Puget Sound. In addition to The Golf Club at Echo Falls, the Oki Golf portfolio also includes Indian Summer Golf & Country Club in Olympia, Washington (private), The Plateau Club in Sammamish, Washington (private), and The Woodlands and The Links courses (formerly Meriwood and Vicwood – both public) at The Golf Club at Hawks Prairie in Lacey, Washington. The flagship courses are located at The Golf Club at Newcastle in Newcastle, WA. Two additional golf properties were added to the group in December 2005. Washington National Golf Club (public) in Auburn, WA, and Trophy Lake Golf & Casting (public) in Port Orchard, WA. (source: okigolf.com) In the winter of 2007, Oki Golf added Harbour Pointe (public) in Mukilteo, Washington. An additional property – Trilogy Golf Course (public) – was purchased in 2008 and has since been renamed to The Golf Club at Redmond Ridge.

During October, 2016, Oki sold eight of his golf courses for $137 million to Chinese-based HNA Holdings. Ownership of commercial real property by foreign businesses is prohibited in China.

== Honours ==
- Order of the Rising Sun, 3rd Class, Gold Rays with Neck Ribbon (2026)
