= River Styx (magazine) =

American literary magazine

River Styx Magazine
- Editor: Lori Baker Martin
- Categories: Literary magazine
- Publisher: Big River Association
- Founded: 1975; 50 years ago
- Company: Big River Association
- Country: United States
- Based in: St. Louis, Missouri
- Language: English
- Website: www.riverstyx.org

River Styx is a literary and visual arts magazine produced in St. Louis, Missouri, and published by Big River Association. It is the oldest literary journal in St. Louis, Missouri.

== Early years ==
River Styx was founded in St Louis, Missouri in 1975, but its history reaches even farther into the past. In the late 1960s, poets and musicians would gather after poetry readings to read their own writing and the work of poets they admired. These sessions evolved into the River Styx Poets radio program, which ran from 1970-1973. Regulars on the show included founding editors Michael and Jan Castro, Danny Spell, and Marvin Hohman.

The magazine has always prided itself on its multicultural approach to publishing and reading series. Early contributors to the magazine included David Meltzer, Jerome Rothenberg, Maurice Kenny, Joy Harjo, Terri McMillan, and Quincy Troupe. The magazine included interviews with Ntozake Shange, Gary Snyder, Gabriel Garcia Marquez, Ansel Adams, Robert Bly, John Barth, Toni Morrison, and Allen Ginsberg.

River Styx magazine is produced by the literary organization River Styx (originally Big River Association), incorporated as a not-for-profit organization in 1975 with Michael Castro as president. The organization also produces literary readings and other events, online and in-person. Michael Castro directed the reading series for more than twenty years, with one year stints by Jan Castro, Peter Carlos, Ann Haubrich, and Jan Rothschild. Events included music by Willie Mae Ford Smith, James Baldwin, the World Saxophone Quartet, and St. Louis Symphony musicians Catherine Lehr, Manuel Ramos, and Rich O'Donnell. Local artists from St. Louis attended, as did visiting writers Breyten Breytenbach, Dennis Brutus, Carolyn Forche, W.S. Merwin, Toni Morrison, Adrienne Rich, and Derek Walcott. Special editions by Arthur Brown and William H. Gass were produced in the 1980s.

In 1995 Richard Newman became editor-in-chief. After Michael Castro left the organization in 2000, Newman became director of the River Styx Poetry Series. In 1986 Jan Castro received the Editors Award for River Styx from CCLM (Coordinating Council for Literary Magazines, now CLMP).

== 21st Century River Styx ==
Due to financial challenges and internal disputes over how the organization should be managed, River Styx shut down briefly in 2022. The magazine and its parent organization were revived in 2023 by Deborah Taffa, who took over as editor-in-chief, and Bryan Castille, who became managing editor. The magazine relaunched as a primarily online journal in June 2023. The editorial staff includes Fiction and Multimedia Editor Christa Fraser, Creative Nonfiction Editor Carla Crujido, and Poetry Editors Danielle Wheeler and Micah Bateman.

In December 2023 it was announced that River Styx would resume publishing a print edition.

The magazine devotes space in each issue to visual artists. Past artists published in the magazine have been Michael Corr, Alejandro Romero, Lynda Frese, Emmet Gowan, John Slaughter, Patte Loper, Birney Imes, Virginia Beahan, Laura McPhee, Deborah Luster, Dana Moore, Benedict Fernandez, Frank Shaw, Sarah Lorentz, Philip Harris, Mary Laube, and Mary F. Coates.

== Awards ==
The magazine has won several Stanley Hanks Prizes, awards from the Coordinating Council of Literary Magazines, and grants and support from the National Endowment for the Arts, Missouri Arts Council, Regional Arts Commission, Missouri Humanities Council, and the Arts and Education Council. Its poems and stories have appeared in the Best American Poetry and New Stories from the South anthologies, Best New Poets, and The Pushcart Prizes: Best of the Small Presses.

== Contributors ==
The magazine has published work by Jacob M. Appel, Margaret Atwood, Jorge Luis Borges, Richard Burgin, Robert Bly, Amy Clampitt, Robert Creeley, Rita Dove, Stephen Dunn, Clayton Eshleman, Martín Espada, William H. Gass, Albert Goldbarth, Allen Ginsberg, Donald Hall, Robert Hass, John Hollander, Jane Ellen Ibur, Rodney Jones, Yusef Komunyakaa, Ted Kooser, Maxine Kumin, Li-Young Lee, Czesław Miłosz, Thylias Moss, Howard Nemerov, Sharon Olds, Octavio Paz, Molly Peacock, Carl Phillips, Adrienne Rich, Jerome Rothenberg, Alan Shapiro, Ntozake Shange, Charles Simic, George Singleton, Gary Snyder, Susan Sontag, William Stafford, May Swenson, Arthur Sze, Wisława Szymborska, Mona Van Duyn, Derek Walcott, Katy Chrisler, Jodi Johnson, Fortunato Salazar, Anca Fodor, Claire Walla, Lise Balk King, Gregory Brown, Parastoo Geranmayeh, Darien Gee, C3 Crew, Rajiv Mohabir, Justin Cox, Daniel Ruiz, Charlene Logan, Alyssa Perry, Mark Neely, Mark Mayer, Becky Kennedy, Mitchell Glazier, Meera Rohit Kumbhani, Robert Nazar Arjoyan, James Crews, Jake Fournier, Jane Wong, Katya Apekina, and Sarah Viren.

== Staff ==
- Editor: Lori Baker Martin
- Managing Editor: Bryan Castille
- Founding Editor: Michael Castro
- Editor Emeritus: Deborah Taffa
- Nonfiction Editor: Claire Walla
- Poetry Editor: Danielle Wheeler
