= America's Foundation for Chess =

American foundation

- Formation: June 2000; 26 years ago
- Founder: Erik Anderson, Laurie and Scott Oki, Yasser Seirawan
- Type: Non-profit
- Legal status: Foundation
- Headquarters: Bellevue, Washington, U.S.
- Coordinates: 47.641°N 122.192°W
- Affiliations: United States Chess Federation
- Website: www.firstmovechess.org
- Formerly called: Seattle Chess Foundation

America's Foundation for Chess (AF4C) is a nonprofit chess foundation based in Bellevue, Washington, United States, a suburb of Seattle. It was founded in June 2000 by Scott Oki and Laurie Oki as the Seattle Chess Foundation. Entrepreneur Erik Anderson and grandmaster Yasser Seirawan are also credited as founders of America's Foundation for Chess.

The foundation was originally formed downtown Seattle, in the Norton Building, and soon after moved into the Fremont neighborhood of Seattle. It eventually ended up at Carillon Point, in suburban Kirkland, Washington, and moved to Bellevue in 2013.

AF4C sponsored the U.S. Chess Championship starting in 1999.

== First Move ==
The foundation's First Move curriculum uses chess as a learning tool in second and third grade classrooms to teach critical and creative thinking skills and improve overall academic achievement. First Move is taught one hour per week, over the course of the school year. The Chess Lady teaches the curriculum via streaming video, classroom teachers facilitate the activities and can learn with their students. In 2014-15 the program will serve about 140,000 students across the United States and a few schools internationally.

== See also ==
- Chess as mental training

== Notes and references ==
=== References ===
- "Erik Anderson profile", Forbes, 2013, archived from the original on November 2, 2012
- Marklein, Mary Beth (March 29, 2011), "To 'Chess Lady,' game is more than fun", USA Today
- Christensen, Maria (2007), Newcomer's Handbook for Moving to and Living in Seattle: Including Bellevue, Redmond, Everett, and Tacoma, First Books, ISBN 9780912301730
- Bhatt, Sanjay (March 15, 2004), "Got game? Foundation promotes chess as classroom learning tool", The Seattle Times
- Tice, Carol (May 19, 2002), "The generosity of 2002 First Citizens Scott and Laurie Oki inspires others to give", Puget Sound Business Journal
- DuBois, Joan (September 19, 2006), "U.S. Chess Federation and America's Foundation for Chess Announce Partnership", Press release, United States Chess Federation and America's Foundation for Chess
- McClain, Dylan Loeb (March 20, 2008), "Idaho Turns to Chess as Education Strategy", The New York Times
- McClain, Dylan Loeb (October 5, 2005a), "Chess, the Game of Royalty, Is Now the Game of Grade Schoolers, Too", The New York Times
- McClain, Dylan (May 21, 2005b), "Financiers Put Money on Chess Futures Now", The New York Times, "The America's Foundation for Chess has also become the primary fund-raiser and supporter of the United States Championship."
- Ramirez, Marc (September 24, 2000), "In chess world, Seattle becomes major player", The Seattle Times
- Kaech, Randy (2003), Northwest Washington Scholastic Chess — Chess Resources
