= James Black Jr. =

American chess player (born 1998)

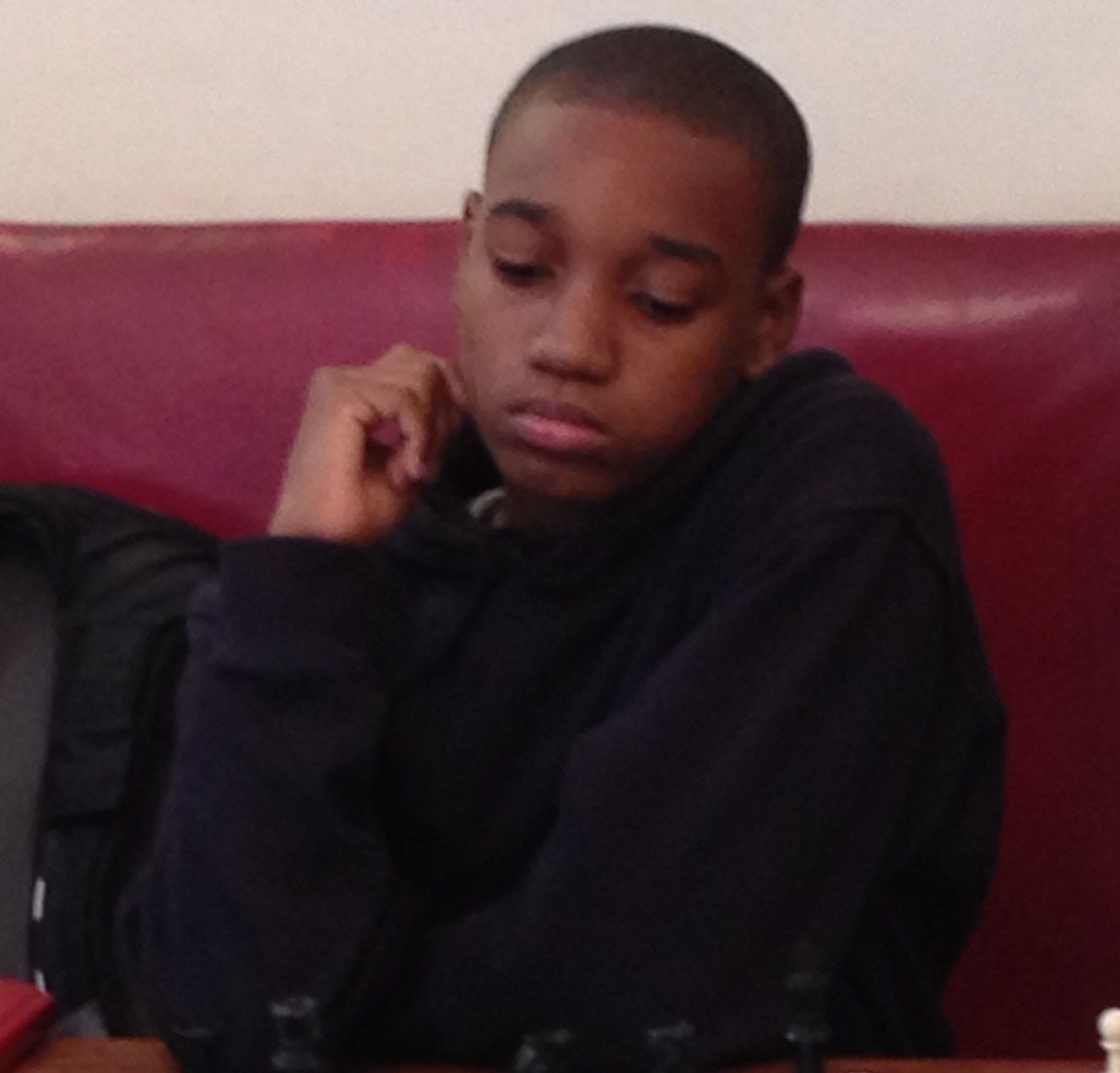
- Black in 2011

Personal information
- Born: 1998 (age 27–28) Brooklyn, New York

Chess career
- Country: United States
- Peak rating: 2232 (July 2012)

James A. Black Jr. is an American chess player.

== Chess career ==
He learned chess from his father at the age of 8, and was mentored by Alexander Stripunsky and Elizabeth Vicary.

In 2011, Black, along with fellow New Yorkers Joshua Colas and Justus Williams, became the youngest African-American chess players to achieve the title of USCF Master; all doing so before the age of 13. In 2016, Black, alongside Colas and Williams, won chess scholarships to Webster University, playing under the team coached by Susan Polgar.
