= Vance Peterson =

American judge (born 1953)

- Born: 1953 (age 72–73)
- Military career
- Allegiance: United States
- Branch: United States Army: Washington Army National Guard
- Service years: 1975–2003; 2011–2012
- Rank: Lieutenant colonel
- Unit: 12th Special Forces Group Security Force Assistance Team
- Conflicts: Operation Enduring Freedom – Afghanistan
- Other work: Lawyer; District Court Judge

Vance Peterson (born in 1953) is a retired United States Army lieutenant colonel and a district court judge in Spokane County, Washington.

== Biography ==
Peterson was commissioned in the United States Army in 1975, and became a Special Forces operator in 1982. Peterson was discharged from active duty in 1979, joined the Army Reserve and eventually the Washington Army National Guard, and began studying law at Gonzaga University; he began practicing law in 1982. Eventually he earned a master's degree from Webster University, and a J.D. from Gonzaga. Since 1999, Peterson has served as a faculty member at Washington State Judicial College. In 2003, he received a mandatory military retirement at the rank of lieutenant colonel after having served 28 years in the Army and the National Guard.

In 1998, Peterson became a judge for Spokane District Court; his efforts led to the establishment of a Veterans' court in Spokane County in 2010. The court is funded with a $1 million grant awarded in 2011, which will pay for its operations for three years; only one of the offenders who have been adjudicated through the Veterans' Court has been convicted of additional criminal acts.

In 2011, Peterson was recalled to active duty and served as an operations adviser to Afghan Police near Mazar-i-Sharif, Afghanistan. In Afghanistan Peterson mentored the Chief of police of Mazar-i- Sharif, helping the police transition away from being a paramilitary force to focusing on law enforcement; at the time he was the only active judge on a security force assistance team. In 2012, Peterson returned to the United States and returned to his position as a judge. In 2013, the Washington State Bar Association awarded Peterson its Local Hero Award.
