= Rochelle Ballantyne =

American-Trinidadian chess player (born 1995)

Personal information
- Born: August 30, 1995 (age 31) New York City, U.S.

Chess career
- Country: United States (until 2025); Trinidad and Tobago (since 2025)
- Peak rating: 1994 (March 2026)

Rochelle Ballantyne (born 1995) is an American-Trinidadian chess player. She is best known for appearing in the 2012 documentary Brooklyn Castle. Her USCF rating is 1988, putting her in the 99th percentile of American junior players. Her FIDE rating is 1912, with her highest rating achieved being 1954 in January 2012. According to the USCF's rating system, she is currently an "Expert" or "Candidate Master."

== Biography ==
Raised in New York City, Rochelle Ballantyne learned to play chess through the Chess-in-the-Schools (CIS) program at PS 139 in Brooklyn. She continued with CIS in Middle School- she graduated from Intermediate School 318 (IS 318) and later, Brooklyn Technical High School. Throughout her high school years at Brooklyn Tech, Rochelle was part of the Chess-in-the-Schools College Bound Program and she received special coaching from grandmaster instructors and academic tutoring and mentoring. During her freshman year (9th grade) at Brooklyn Tech, she won the 2012 All-Girls National Chess Championships, and was consequently awarded a full college scholarship to the University of Texas at Dallas; her story was featured in Brooklyn Castle. She later received a full scholarship to Stanford University, which she graduated from in 2017. She received an MA in education policy from Columbia University in 2020. In fall 2020 she began law school at New York University Law School, fully funded by the AnBryce Scholarship.

== Chess ==
In 2008, at the age of 13, Ballantyne played against Garry Kasparov in a game known as "Harlem Shake" in which Kasparov played and beat 19 opponents simultaneously.

== In media ==
Ballantyne has appeared as herself in media.

- Brooklyn Castle (2012)
- Melissa Harris-Perry (2012)
- The Jeff Probst Show (2013)
- Harry (2017)
