= Lara Smith =

Managing Director of Dad's Garage Theatre Company

Lara Smith is Managing Director of Dad's Garage Theatre Company in Atlanta, GA.

In 2014, Smith led the Dad's Garage Theatre Company in a capital campaign to raise funds to purchase a new theatre in Atlanta. The Kickstarter campaign for Dad's Garage was an overwhelming success, raising $169,985 from more than 1,000 donors, which was at that time the most money raised by a live theatre on Kickstarter.

Smith was named one of the "40 under 40" for 2015 by the Atlanta Business Chronicle. This award recognizes "the next generation of Atlanta business leaders... 40 people under age 40 who make significant career achievements and have demonstrated social responsibility."
