= US Chess Center =

American chess organization

The US Chess Center is an American non-profit organization that teaches at-risk youth in the Washington, D.C., area how to play chess.

The center runs chess tournaments and brings in high level chess players to speak to students. The Center is headquartered in Silver Spring, MD, and its president is David Mehler, an attorney.

Established in 1991, the Center opened in July 1992. In 1993, the Center brought the U.S. Chess Hall of Fame and Museum to Washington, D.C., from New Windsor, NY. In 1995 the Center published Macon Shibut's The U.S. Chess Hall of Fame. In 2001, the hall of fame and museum moved from Washington, first to Florida and then to St. Louis, MO.

== Programs ==
The Center was created to teach at-risk youth to play chess as a means of improving their academic and social skills. The Center has created chess programs in more than 130 locations, mainly public schools, in Washington, D.C., and its surrounding suburbs. These programs included before- and after-school chess clubs as well as classes for students during the academic day. More than 30,000 students have been in the Center's classes, completing at least one 15-week program.

== Competitions ==
The Center has run chess competitions for players of all ages and led discussions of top-level competitions. It has hosted chess notables such as Garry Kasparov, Maurice Ashley, and Rochelle Ballantyne.

The Center has hosted 11 national championship tournaments: It co-sponsored the U.S. Cadet Chess Championship (the official national championship for players under age 16) from 1993 through 1996 and sponsored the United States Armed Forces Chess Championship from 1994 through 2000.

== Awards ==
The Center received the 1996 Committee on Chess in Education Award and the 2012 United States Chess Federation Scholastic Service Award.
