= IS 318 =

Coordinates: 40.70344°N 73.94842°W

Intermediate School 318 (IS 318)
- The Eugenio Maria de Hostos School
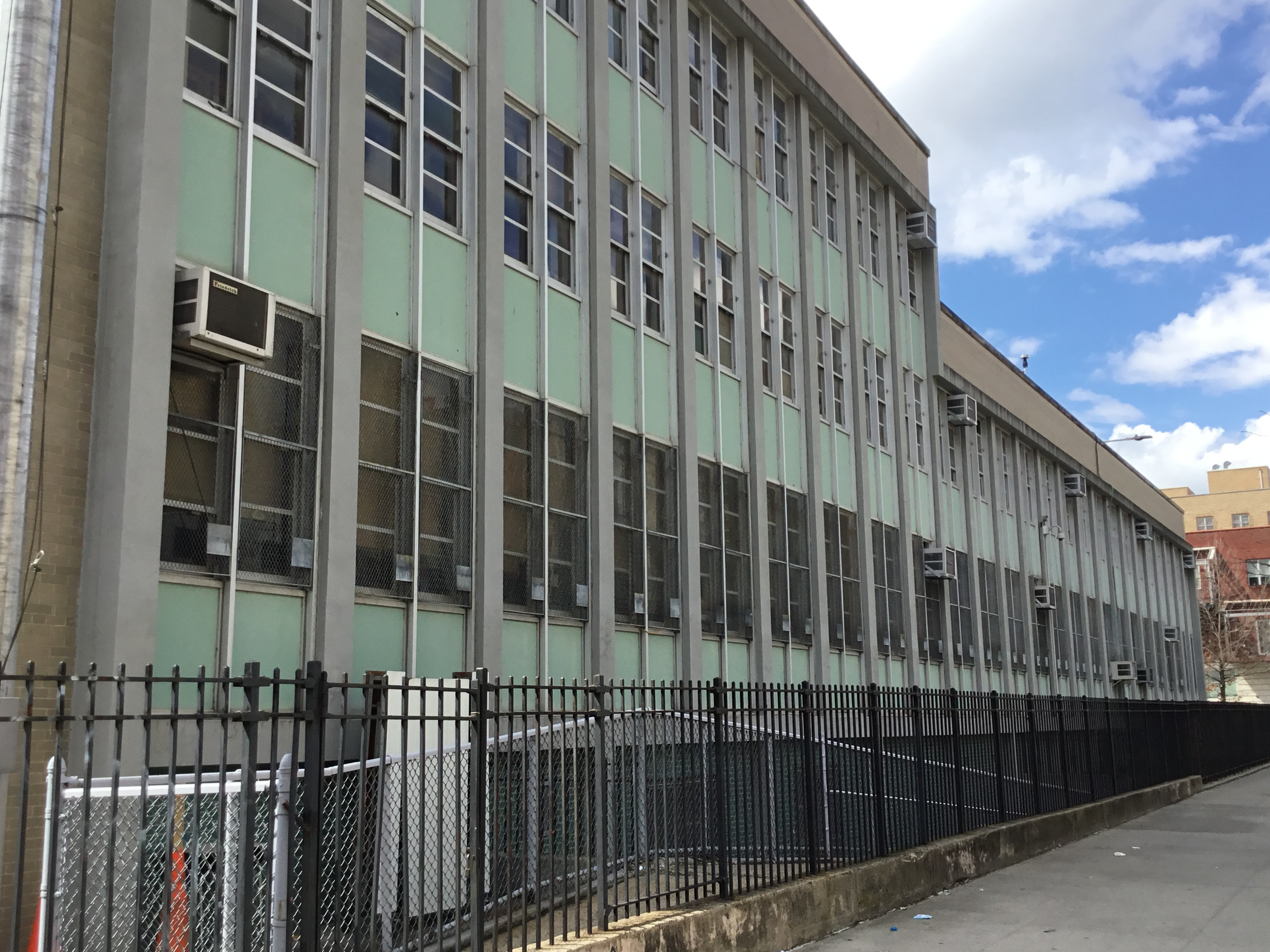
- IS 318 in Williamsburg, Brooklyn

Location
- 101 Walton Street; Williamsburg, Brooklyn; New York City, New York 11206

Information
- School type: public junior high school
- School district: 14
- Principal: John Galvin
- Faculty: 134
- Grades: 6th–8th
- Enrollment: 1,623 (2014)

Intermediate School 318 (IS 318; also known as the Eugenio Maria de Hostos School) is a public junior high school at 101 Walton Street in Williamsburg, Brooklyn, New York City. Most of the school's 1,623 students, who are sixth-, seventh-, and eighth-graders, are from Williamsburg. The school has 134 teachers.

Over 70% of the students come from families whose income is below the poverty line. Over 90% of the students are of Latino, Black, or Asian/Pacific descent.

The school's chess program has been called the best middle-school program in the United States, and in 2012 the school's team became the first middle school team to win the United States Chess Federation national high school championship. The school's team was followed and featured in a 2012 documentary film entitled Brooklyn Castle.

== Student demographics ==
The student poverty rate is over 70%.

Two thirds of the students are Hispanic. Over 90% of the students are of Latino, Black, or Asian/Pacific descent.

== Chess program ==
Author Paul Tough wrote in How Children Succeed: Grit, Curiosity, and the Hidden Power of Character (2012):

the chess program in the Intermediate School 318 is the best middle-school program in the United States, bar none. In fact, it is almost certainly the best scholastic chess program in the country at any grade level.

About half the school's students take chess classes. Elizabeth Spiegel was hired a part-time chess tutor in 1999 and as the team's full-time chess teacher in 2007, and oversees its 80-member chess team as chess coach. She was one of the top 30 female chess players in the United States in 2013.

In 2009, the team won the sixth-, seventh- and eighth-grade titles at the United States Chess Federation's National Scholastic K-12 Championship.

In 2011, as the school's team faced budget cuts, the Brooklyn Navy Yard Cogeneration Plant donated $25,000 to the school's chess program.

By 2012, it had won at least two dozen national championships since 2000, according to one of its coaches, and two of its members, both 13 years of age, were rated as chess masters.

Team member Rochelle Ballantyne, who was raised by a single mom from Trinidad and is aiming to become the first African-American woman to become a chess master, said: "We were meant to break stereotypes. Chess isn’t something people are good at because of the color of their skin. We just really work very hard at it." Team member Justus Williams became the youngest-ever African-American "National Master", at the age of 12. Team member Isaac Barayev, 2012 New York City junior high school chess champion, is the grandson of émigrés from the former Soviet Union.

In 2012, its team became the first middle school team to win the United States Chess Federation national high school championship since the competition started in 1969, beating students four years older. A total of 318 teams competed in the championship. Along the way, it defeated several chess teams including New York's Stuyvesant High School and Edward R. Murrow High School. 87% of the team members came from homes with incomes below the federal poverty line.

In 2013, the team was struggling to raise sufficient money to continue to pay for the after-school classes and travel that allow it to continue to compete.

The school's chess team was followed and featured in a 2012 documentary film entitled Brooklyn Castle. The film won the audience award at the 2012 South by Southwest film festival in Austin, Texas.

In 2014, the school's chess team has won 2 championship titles for 8th and 7th grade in the USCF Grade National in Florida.

In 2015, the school's chess team won the New York City Junior High School Championship, New York State Junior High School Championship, Mayor's Cup, All-Girls National Championship, Junior High School K9 National Championship as well as Elementary K6 National Championship. Four young women in the school, Nancy Wang (8th grade), Mengnan Chen (8th grade), Vicki Yang (7th grade), and Katrina Wong (6th grade), qualified for the 2015 World Youth Championship in Halkidiki, Greece.

In 2018, the school's chess team won 2 championships for 6th and 8th grade in the USCF Grade National in Orlando, Florida.
