= Jane Ellen Ibur =

American poet

- Born: October 21, 1950 (age 75); St. Louis, Missouri, United States
- Education: Webster College
- Occupations: Poet; arts educator

Jane Ellen Ibur (born 1950) is an American poet and arts educator living in St. Louis, Missouri, United States. She has been chosen to serve as the Poet Laureate for St. Louis, MO. She runs the program Poets and Writers Ink for young writers in middle and high school in the St. Louis area. She has twice been recognized by the Missouri Scholars Academy and has received many awards as an author and educator.

== Early life and education ==
Jane Ellen (Janie) Ibur was born October 21, 1950, in St. Louis, Missouri, to Leslie L. Ibur and Betty Harris Ibur. She was the second of six children and the first girl. After graduating from high school in 1968, she attended Webster College in Webster Groves, Missouri, obtaining, in 1972, a Bachelor of Arts degree in English and a lifetime teaching certificate in secondary English. Ibur taught middle school children for two years, at which point she interrupted her career to become the primary caretaker for her friend and mentor, Mary R. Woodard, a woman who had been in the Ibur family's employ for forty years. Her 33-year bond with Woodard became the subject of Ibur's poetic memoir, Both Wings Flappin', Still Not Flyin'.

== Professional career ==
Ibur established the habit of writing in elementary school by keeping a journal; she began writing poetry in middle school. Although she pursued a course of independent study in creative writing during college, she regards herself as virtually self-taught in the forms of poetry, knowledge that she acquired through reading and practice.

When Ibur resumed teaching, her goal was to make creative writing an outreach medium. While she has continued, over the course of her career, to teach writing and poetry to elementary and secondary students in public and private schools throughout the St. Louis area, to work as an outreach educator in numerous residential schools, and to work at multiple school sites in reading supplement programs, she has sought to expand the settings in which she teaches and to vary the groups with whom she works.

She has taught creative writing to seniors enrolled in a lifelong learning program, to adults and children participating in St. Louis museum-sponsored writing workshops, and to women enrolled in YMCA writing classes. As a consequence of her involvement with the YMCA, she began teaching women and juvenile males at the county jail. She is a pioneer in creative education with prisoners and, for more than 30 years, has been teaching adult males on the maximum security floor of the St. Louis County Jail. In recent years, her teaching has focused primarily on formal poetry with all her students. She uses poetry as one way to process thoughts and to problem solve, to form community and to learn negotiation skills.

Ibur has encouraged literacy through creative writing in multiple low-income housing projects in St. Louis and neighboring towns in Missouri, and she has taught in job readiness programs for the junior colleges in St. Louis. For ten years she taught writing to men who were homeless, creating a performance piece entitled Footsteps from the Margins, and she worked with older women who were being served by a neighborhood settlement house. Her work as a teacher of poetry has been funded by many mental health grants for organizations serving homeless, pregnant teens; mentally ill adults; women recovering from domestic violence; and veterans suffering from post-traumatic stress disorder and depression.

For 19 years, Ibur co-produced and co-anchored Literature for the Halibut, a literary radio show on community radio in St. Louis. She is the founding poet educator of the innovative Community Arts Training (CAT) Institute at the Regional Arts Commission of St. Louis. Through the CAT Institute she has, since 1997, prepared more than three hundred artists of all disciplines and community activists to collaborate in developing arts programs aimed at effecting social change, primarily in under-resourced community settings such as neighborhood organizations, social service agencies, development initiatives, and education programs. The CAT Institute is a national model that has received recognition from the National Endowment for the Arts, The Kresge Foundation, and the Nathan Cummings Foundation among others.

Currently Ibur runs Poets and Writers Ink for emerging young writers, especially those in middle and high school. For more than 20 years, young writers—many of whom go on to major in creative writing in college—have studied with Ibur in this program. She has continued her work with prisoners and with veterans, and she has conducted a private writing workshop for adults for the past 20 years.

== Personal life ==
Ibur and her spouse, Sondra M. Seiler, live in St. Louis, Missouri.

== Awards and recognition ==
Ibur has been recognized twice by the Missouri Scholars Academy. She received a World of Difference Award from the Anti-Defamation League; a St. Louis Visionary Award for Outstanding Arts Educator; the Warrior Poet Award from Word in Motion; an Author Recognition Award from the Missouri Center for the Book; and a Loretto Award for humanitarian and social justice service from Webster University. Her poetry, published in literary journals and anthologies since 1972, has garnered numerous awards.

== Published works ==
Ibur is the author of Both Wings Flappin’, Still Not Flyin’ (2014) and The Little ~~Mrs.~~/Misses (2017), both from PenUltimate Press, Inc.

Ibur, Jane, "Us and Them" in Teaching the Arts Behind Bars, ed. Rachel Marie-Crane Williams, (Boston: Northeastern University Press, 2003), 96–105.

=== Literary anthologies ===
1. "Stray Dogs," "Cat Nap," The First Anthology of Missouri Women Writers, Sheba Review, Inc., Jefferson City, MO, 1987.
2. "If Only," If I Had A Hammer: Women's Work in Poetry, Fiction and Photographs, Papier-Mache Press, Watsonville, CA, 1990.
3. "If Only," The Book of Wisdom, Multnomah Publishers, Inc., Sisters, OR, 1997.
4. "God On Noah," "Grandmother And Me," First Harvest, Brodsky Library Press, St. Louis, MO, 1997.
5. "Remains," Animals in Poetry, Sarasota Poetry Theatre Press, Sarasota, FL, 2001.
6. "Tea," Drumvoices Review – Special 10th Anniversary Anthology of Poetry, Fiction and Drama, Southern Illinois University Press, Edwardsville, IL, 2003.
7. "Gangrene," "The Great Toe," Reflections on a Life With Diabetes: A Memoir in Many Voices, Virtualbookworm.com Publishing Inc., College Station, TX, 2004.
8. "Mrs. Abraham," "Mrs. Stand-in," "Shooting Stars" "Mom & Frank," New Harvest, Brodsky Library Press, St. Louis, MO, 2005.
9. "Daze," Blindness Isn't Black, VSA Arts of Missouri Press, St. Louis, MO, 2009.
10. "Mrs. Noah’s Seduction," "Third Year," "Mrs. Noah’s Sing-a-long," Winter Harvest, Brodsky Library Press, St Louis, MO, 2011.

=== Literary magazines ===
1. "After Apple Picking," River Styx, No. 5 –World Myths (1979), Big River Association Press, St. Louis, MO.
2. "Chair," "Teeth," Webster Review, Vol. 5, No. 2 (1980), Webster College Press, St. Louis, MO.
3. "She Locks Her Memories," "World's Rim," Phantasmagoria, Vol. II, No. 2 (1981), Pin Prick Press, Shaker Heights, OH.
4. "How High Is Maybe," Pastiche, Vol. II, Nos. 9 and 10 (1981), Pin Prick Press, Shaker Heights, OH.
5. "Augusta," Eads Bridge: A Literary Review, Vol. VIII, No. 2 (1981), Saint Louis University Press, St. Louis, MO.
6. "A Hat Converses With Its Head," Pastiche, Vol. II, Nos. 11 and 12 (1981), Pin Prick Press, Shaker Heights, OH.
7. "Dear Daughter, Dear Mother," Eads Bridge: A Literary Review, Vol. IX, No. 1 (1982), St. Louis University Press, St. Louis, MO.
8. "The Home With No Means Of Access," Phantasmagoria, Vol. III, No. 1 (1982), Pin Prick Press, Shaker Heights, OH.
9. "Office Hours," Pastiche, Vol. III, Nos. 1 and 2 (1982), Pin Prick Press, Shaker Heights, OH.
10. "The Girl In The Closet," "The Honk," Slipstream, Vol. III (1983), Slipstream Publications, Niagara Falls, NY.
11. "Click Your Heels," "I Been Sick So Long, It's Begun To Be A Song To Me," Eads Bridge: A Literary Review, Vol. X, No. 1 (1983), St. Louis University Press, St. Louis, MO.
12. "Haunted," Writer's Information – Rhyme Time (1985), Rhyme time/Story time/Mystery time Press, Coeur d'Alene, ID.
13. "The Honk," Eads Bridge: A Literary Review, Vol. XII, No. 1 (1986), St. Louis University Press, St. Louis, MO.
14. "Family Life," Soulard Culture Squad Review, No. 1 (1986), St. Louis, MO.
15. "A Man Leans Forward," Crazyquilt, Vol. II, No. 3 (1987), Crazyquilt Press, San Diego, CA.
16. "He Took It With Him," Radical Bones, Vol. I, No. 1 (1987), Nanora Sweet Press, St. Louis, MO.
17. "His Bread I Eat, His Song I Sing," "Ingestion," Eads Bridge: A Literary Review, Vol. XIV, No. 1 (1987), St. Louis University Press, St. Louis, MO.
18. "The Crying House," Saint Louis Home Magazine (1987), Pershing Publishing Corporation, St. Louis, MO.
19. "My Father’s Secret Life," Life, Liberty and the Pursuit of Poetry (1989), Putnam Press, St. Louis, MO.
20. "Corn," "Phone," "Plate," "Glove," "Cards," "River," "Mirror," "Shoes," Webster Review, Vol. XIV, No. 1 (1989), Webster University Press, St. Louis, MO.
21. "Your Face," Eads Bridge: A Literary Review, Vol. XVI, No. 1 (1989), St. Louis University Press, St. Louis, MO.
22. "Friday Nights," "Sparrows," River Styx, No. 32 (1990), Big River Association Press, St. Louis, MO.
23. "Rebirth," Literati Internazionale, Vol. I, No. 1 (1991), McGraw-Beauchamp Publications, Chicago, IL.
24. "Pieces of My Soul," Break Bread With The World: A Commemorative Collection Of Poems/Anecdotes/Commentaries (1991), Parks Publishing Corporation, East St. Louis, IL.
25. "Spinner Sponn," "Hot Dog Kind of Girl," Spitball, No. 43 (1993), McNaughton & Gunn, Inc. Publications, Cincinnati, OH.
26. "Augusta," Webster Review, No. 17 (1993), Webster University Press, St. Louis, MO.
27. "Ham," Earth’s Daughters, No. 43/44 (1994), Something Press, Buffalo, NY.
28. "Bowl," California State Poetry Quarterly, Vol. 21, No. 4 (1995), Kimberly Press Inc., Orange, CA.
29. "Water," "God On Noah," Sagarin Review, Vol. 5 (1995), St. Louis College of Jewish Studies Press, St. Louis, MO.
30. "Slaughter," Work, Vol. 1, No. 2 (Fall/Winter 1995/96), Wagging Tale Publications, San Francisco, CA .
31. "Wounds," Mediphors, No. 6. (Fall/Winter 1995), Mediphors Inc., Bloomsburg, PA.
32. "Amtrak Disaster," "Dream Catcher," Eyeball, No. 4. (1997), First Civilizations Inc., St. Louis, MO.
33. "Mrs. Paladin," "Mrs. Rifleman," River Styx, No. 54 (1999), Big River Association Press, St. Louis, MO.
34. "Tea," "1970," "Undress," Drumvoices Review: A Confluence of Literary, Cultural and Vision Arts, Vol. 8, Nos. 1 and 2 (1999), Southern Illinois University Press, Edwardsville, IL.
35. "Half the Problem," Drumvoices Review: Words from 15 Cities – Poetic Voices of Contemporary Urban Cultures, Vol. 9, Nos. 1 and 2 (2000), Southern Illinois University Press, Edwardsville, IL.
36. "Water," "Cutting Toenails," Sagarin Review, Vol. 5 (2002), St. Louis College of Jewish Studies Press, St. Louis, MO.
37. "Just," Natural Bridge, No. 9 (2003), University of Missouri Press, St. Louis, MO.
38. "Mrs. Noah Looks Back," Runes – A Review of Poetry: Storm Issue (2004), Arctos Press, Sausalito, CA.
39. "Forbidden," Lilith, Vol. 30, No. 2 (2005), Lilith Publications, Inc., New York, NY.
40. "Grief," "Night Creatures," "Wings Moist from the Other World," Natural Bridge, No. 15 (2006), University of Missouri Press, St. Louis, MO.
41. "Hibiscus," "The Skull," Boulevard, Vol. 21, Nos. 62 and 63 (2006), St. Louis University Press, St. Louis, MO.
42. "Frying Pan," River Styx, No. 76/77 (2008), Big River Association Press, St. Louis, MO.
43. "Mrs. Noah 3:27," Sou’wester (2009), Southern Illinois University Press, Edwardsville, IL.
44. "Mrs. Noah: Lost and Found," Folio, Winter 2010 (2009), American University Press, Washington, DC.
45. "Tea," Drumvoices Review: A Confluence of Literary, Cultural and Vision Arts, Vol. 17 (2011), Southern Illinois University Press, Edwardsville, IL.
