= Justus Williams =

American chess player (born 1998)

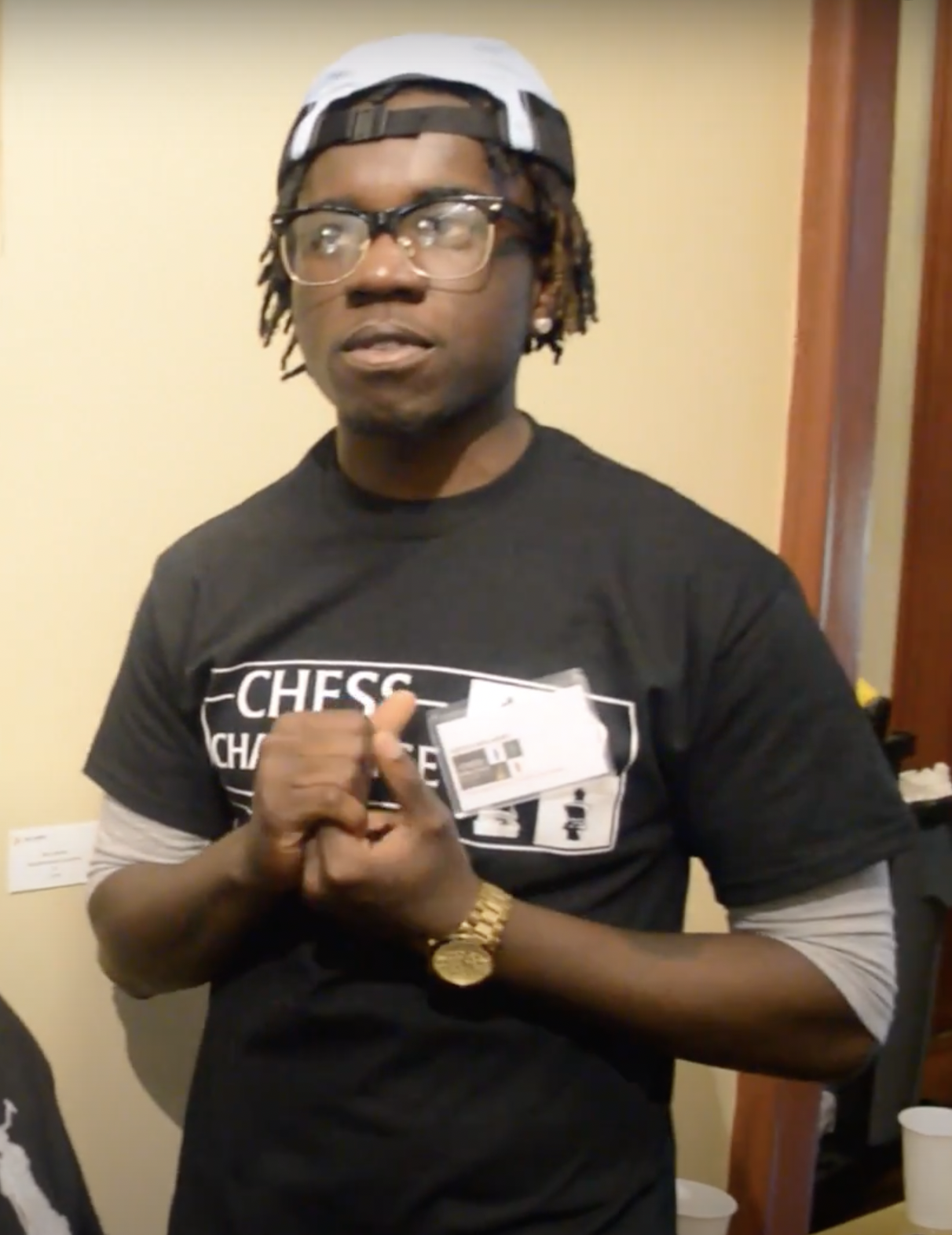
- Williams in 2016

Personal information
- Born: 25 May 1998 (age 28) Bronx, New York

Chess career
- Country: United States
- Title: International Master (2021)
- Peak rating: 2428 (April 2022)

Justus D. Williams (born 25 May 1998) is an American chess player who holds the title of International Master (IM).

== Biography ==
He has a peak FIDE rating of 2420. When Williams was 12 years old, he became the youngest African American to earn the US Chess Federation (USCF) title of National Master (NM), surpassing Kassa Korley and since surpassed by several players, including current record-holder Brewington Hardaway. At junior high school IS 318 in New York City, he was a member of the team that won the K-8 junior high school national championship in 2010 and the first middle school team to win the K-12 high school national championship in 2012. Williams was featured as the star player of his junior high school chess team in the 2012 documentary Brooklyn Castle. Williams attended Webster University in St. Louis, where he played on the chess team on a full scholarship with middle school teammate James Black Jr. and fellow New York City area player Joshua Colas, both of whom also appeared in the Brooklyn Castle film. His college chess team was coached by Grandmaster (GM) Susan Polgar. Williams became a FIDE Master (FM) in 2013 and an International Master in 2021. He had earned all three of his IM norms by 2017 and clinched the title by reaching the rating threshold of 2400 four years later. He earned his first Grandmaster norm at the Charlotte Chess Center Fall Invitational with 6.5/9.
