= Joshua Colas =

American chess player (born 1998)

Personal information
- Born: 5 September 1998 (age 27) White Plains, New York

Chess career
- Country: United States
- Title: FIDE Master (2015)
- Peak rating: 2387 (April 2016)

Joshua Colas (born 5 September 1998) is an American chess player who holds the title of FIDE Master.

== Biography ==
He was once the youngest African American to become a US Chess Federation (USCF) National Master (NM), which he accomplished in 2010 at 12 years, 3 months, and 11 days old. Colas was born to Haitian immigrants in White Plains, New York. He learned how to play chess from his father and entered his first national tournament at age seven. He was the US 7th grade national champion in 2010, 10th grade national champion in 2013, and 11th grade national champion in 2014. Colas became a FIDE Master in 2015. He has earned all three of the norms needed for the International Master (IM) title, and only needs to reach the FIDE rating threshold of 2400 to clinch the title. Colas had his best tournament at the 2015 North American Open, where he earned one of his IM norms and also earned his first and only Grandmaster (GM) norm. During the tournament, he scored 6½/9 with a performance rating of 2667, having defeated two Grandmasters. Colas attended Webster University alongside fellow African-American and New Yorker chess players James Black Jr. and Justus Williams, where he played on the chess team coached by GM Susan Polgar while on a full chess scholarship.
