= List of chess games between Anand and Kramnik =

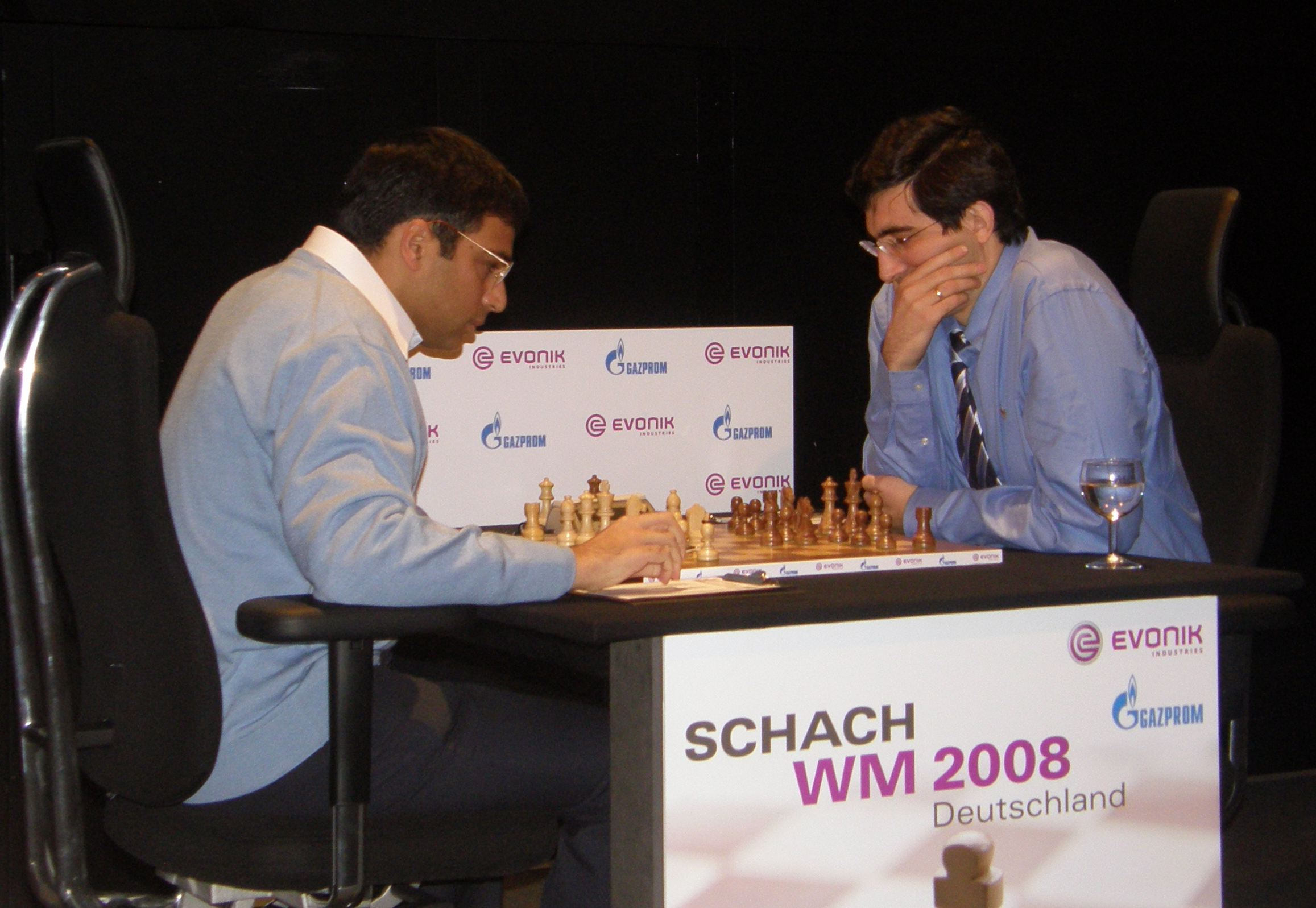
Anand and Kramnik in the World Chess Championship 2008

Viswanathan Anand (born 11 December 1969) and Vladimir Kramnik (born 25 June 1975) have played 91 classical chess games (including no-castling chess games), of which Kramnik won 11, Anand won 11, and 69 games were drawn. In the standard rapid format Anand has 11 wins, Kramnik has 7 wins with 44 draws. In the standard blitz format Kramnik has 9 wins, Anand has 6 wins with 17 draws.

The World Chess Championship 2008 between the players was won by Anand.

== Classical games ==
	White	Black	Year	Result	Moves	Winner	Tournament	Opening	Notes	Reference
1	Kramnik	Anand	1989	½–½	19		Moscow	C54 Giuoco Piano	Kramnik was 14 years old and Anand was 19	
2	Kramnik	Anand	1993	½–½	23		Linares	E12 Queen's Indian Defence		
3	Kramnik	Anand	1993	½–½	40		Amsterdam, Max Euwe Memorial	A17 English Opening		
4	Anand	Kramnik	1993	½–½	27		Amsterdam, Max Euwe Memorial	B66 Sicilian Defence		
5	Anand	Kramnik	1993	½–½	35		Madrid	B32 Sicilian Defence		
6	Kramnik	Anand	1993	½–½	11		Groningen	D14 Slav Defence		
7	Kramnik	Anand	1994	½–½	17		Linares	D41 Queen's Gambit Declined		
8	Kramnik	Anand	1995	½–½	41		Riga, Tal Memorial	D85 Grünfeld Defence		
9	Kramnik	Anand	1996	0–1	108	Anand	Amsterdam, Max Euwe Memorial	B36 Sicilian Defence	The first decisive game	
10	Kramnik	Anand	1996	1–0	101	Kramnik	Dos Hermanas	D85 Grünfeld Defence		
11	Anand	Kramnik	1996	½–½	16		Dortmund	B31 Sicilian Defence		
12	Anand	Kramnik	1996	½–½	20		Las Palmas	B65 Sicilian Defence		
13	Kramnik	Anand	1996	1–0	41	Kramnik	Las Palmas	A14 English Opening		
14	Kramnik	Anand	1997	½–½	14		Linares	D39 Queen's Gambit Declined		
15	Kramnik	Anand	1997	½–½	41		Dos Hermanas	D39 Queen's Gambit Declined		
16	Anand	Kramnik	1997	½–½	24		Dortmund	B33 Sicilian Defence		
17	Kramnik	Anand	1997	0–1	42	Anand	Belgrad	D43 Semi-Slav Defence		
18	Anand	Kramnik	1998	½–½	30		Wijk aan Zee	B33 Sicilian Defence		
19	Anand	Kramnik	1998	½–½	28		Linares	B33 Sicilian Defence		
20	Kramnik	Anand	1998	½–½	34		Linares	E32 Nimzo-Indian Defence		
21	Kramnik	Anand	1998	½–½	20		Dortmund	A17 English Opening		
22	Anand	Kramnik	1998	1–0	35	Anand	Tilburg	C42 Petrov's Defence		
23	Anand	Kramnik	1999	½–½	27		Wijk aan Zee	C42 Petrov's Defence		
24	Kramnik	Anand	1999	½–½	19		Linares	D21 Queen's Gambit Accepted		
25	Anand	Kramnik	1999	½–½	21		Linares	C42 Petrov's Defence		
26	Kramnik	Anand	1999	1–0	70	Kramnik	Dos Hermanas	D27 Queen's Gambit Accepted		
27	Kramnik	Anand	1999	½–½	18		Dortmund	E37 Nimzo-Indian Defence		
28	Anand	Kramnik	2000	½–½	40		Wijk aan Zee	B66 Sicilian Defence		
29	Kramnik	Anand	2000	½–½	20		Linares	D18 Slav Defence		
30	Anand	Kramnik	2000	½–½	25		Linares	C42 Petrov's Defence		
31	Kramnik	Anand	2000	1–0	65	Kramnik	Dortmund	A17 English Opening		
32	Kramnik	Anand	2001	½–½	35		Wijk aan Zee	E55 Nimzo-Indian Defence		
33	Anand	Kramnik	2001	½–½	17		Dortmund	C42 Petrov's Defence		
34	Kramnik	Anand	2001	1–0	39	Kramnik	Dortmund	D27 Queen's Gambit Accepted		
35	Kramnik	Anand	2003	½–½	51		Wijk aan Zee	C42 Petrov's Defence		
36	Anand	Kramnik	2003	½–½	16		Linares	B30 Sicilian Defence		
37	Kramnik	Anand	2003	½–½	32		Linares	C88 Ruy Lopez: Anti-Marshall		
38	Anand	Kramnik	2003	½–½	25		Dortmund	B33 Sicilian Defence		
39	Kramnik	Anand	2003	½–½	21		Dortmund	D39 Queen's Gambit Declined		
40	Kramnik	Anand	2004	½–½	25		Wijk aan Zee	B92 Sicilian Najdorf		
41	Anand	Kramnik	2004	½–½	18		France, team championships	C88 Ruy Lopez: Anti-Marshall		
42	Anand	Kramnik	2004	½–½	60		Dortmund final	C88 Ruy Lopez: Anti-Marshall		
43	Kramnik	Anand	2004	½–½	47		Dortmund final	B49 Sicilian Defence		
44	Anand	Kramnik	2005	½–½	27		Wijk aan Zee	B33 Sicilian Defence		
45	Kramnik	Anand	2005	½–½	32		Sofia MTel Masters	C42 Petrov's Defence		
46	Anand	Kramnik	2005	1–0	20	Anand	Sofia MTel Masters	C42 Petrov's Defence		
47	Kramnik	Anand	2007	1–0	53	Kramnik	Wijk aan Zee	E05 Catalan Opening		
48	Kramnik	Anand	2007	½–½	35		Dortmund	D12 Slav Defence		
49	Anand	Kramnik	2007	½–½	65		Mexico, FIDE World Championship	C42 Petrov's Defence		
50	Kramnik	Anand	2007	½–½	41		Mexico, FIDE World Championship	D43 Semi-Slav Defence	Anand was leading the tournament 1.5 points ahead of Kramnik. This game was practically Kramnik's last chance to fight to maintain his title.	
51	Anand	Kramnik	2008	½–½	61		Wijk aan Zee	C42 Petrov's Defence		
52	Kramnik	Anand	2008	½–½	32		The World Chess Championship 2008 match in Bonn	D14 Slav Defence		
53	Anand	Kramnik	2008	½–½	32		Bonn	E25 Nimzo-Indian Defence		
54	Kramnik	Anand	2008	0–1	41	Anand	Bonn	D49 Semi-Slav Defence, Meran		
55	Anand	Kramnik	2008	½–½	29		Bonn	D37 Queen's Gambit Declined		
56	Kramnik	Anand	2008	0–1	35	Anand	Bonn	D49 Semi-Slav Defence, Meran		
57	Anand	Kramnik	2008	1–0	47	Anand	Bonn	E34 Nimzo-Indian Defence		
58	Anand	Kramnik	2008	½–½	37		Bonn	D19 Slav Defence		
59	Kramnik	Anand	2008	½–½	39		Bonn	D37 Queen's Gambit Declined		
60	Anand	Kramnik	2008	½–½	45		Bonn	D43 Slav Defence		
61	Kramnik	Anand	2008	1–0	29	Kramnik	Bonn	E21 Nimzo-Indian Defence		
62	Anand	Kramnik	2008	½–½	24		Bonn	B96 Sicilian, Najdorf		
63	Kramnik	Anand	2009	½–½	29		Moscow, Tal Memorial	D85 Grünfeld Defence		
64	Anand	Kramnik	2010	1–0	45	Anand	Wijk aan Zee	C42 Petrov's Defence		
65	Anand	Kramnik	2010	½–½	35		Bilbao	E04 Catalan Opening		
66	Kramnik	Anand	2010	½–½	37		Bilbao	D44 Queen's Gambit Declined: Vienna Variation		
67	Anand	Kramnik	2010	½–½	39		London Chess Classic	C67 Ruy Lopez: Berlin Defence		
68	Anand	Kramnik	2011	½–½	23		Wijk aan Zee	E32 Nimzo-Indian Defence		
69	Anand	Kramnik	2011	½–½	36		Tal Memorial	D37 Queen's Gambit Declined		
70	Anand	Kramnik	2011	½–½	39		London Chess Classic	D37 Queen's Gambit Declined		
71	Anand	Kramnik	2012	½–½	40		London Chess Classic	C65 Ruy Lopez: Berlin Defence		
72	Kramnik	Anand	2013	½–½	41		Zurich Chess Challenge	A07 King's Indian Attack		
73	Anand	Kramnik	2013	1–0	27	Anand	Zurich Chess Challenge	C65 Ruy Lopez: Berlin Defence		
74	Kramnik	Anand	2013	½–½	39		Alekhine Memorial	D43 Semi-Slav Defence		
75	Anand	Kramnik	2013	½–½	30		Tal Memorial	E32 Nimzo-Indian Defence		
76	Anand	Kramnik	2014	½–½	30		World Chess Championship Candidates 2014	D39 Queen's Gambit Declined		
77	Kramnik	Anand	2014	½–½	31		World Chess Championship Candidates 2014	E06 Catalan Opening		
78	Kramnik	Anand	2014	½–½	45		London Chess Classic	D44 Semi-Slav Defence		
79	Anand	Kramnik	2015	½–½	47		Zurich Chess Challenge	D36 Queen's Gambit Declined		
80	Kramnik	Anand	2015	½–½	38		Gashimov Memorial	D43 Semi-Slav Defence		
81	Anand	Kramnik	2016	½–½	32		Zurich Chess Challenge	C65 Ruy Lopez: Berlin Defence		
82	Kramnik	Anand	2016	1–0	51	Kramnik	Tal Memorial	C53 Giuoco Piano		
83	Anand	Kramnik	2016	½–½	24		London Chess Classic	D37 Queen's Gambit Declined		
84	Kramnik	Anand	2017	1–0	38	Kramnik	Korchnoi Zurich Chess Challenge	A30 English, Symmetrical		
85	Anand	Kramnik	2017	0–1	60	Kramnik	Altibox Norway	C78 Ruy Lopez		
86	Anand	Kramnik	2018	0–1	36	Kramnik	Tata Steel Masters	C50 Giuoco Piano		
87	Kramnik	Anand	2019	0–1	57	Anand	Tata Steel Masters	C50 Giuoco Piano		

== Rapid games ==
	White	Black	Year	Result	Moves	Winner	Tournament	Opening	Notes	Reference
1	Kramnik	Anand	1994	1–0	26	Kramnik	Amber tournament	A33 English Opening		
2	Anand	Kramnik	1994	½–½	57		PCA/Intel-GP	B33 Sicilian Defence		
3	Kramnik	Anand	1994	½–½	17		PCA/Intel-GP	A04 Zukertort Opening		
4	Anand	Kramnik	1995	1–0	42	Anand	Amber tournament	B08 Pirc Defence		
5	Kramnik	Anand	1996	½–½	19		Amber tournament	A17 English Opening		
6	Anand	Kramnik	1996	½–½	29		WDR Match TV	D56 Queen's Gambit Declined	60 mins	
7	Anand	Kramnik	1997	1–0	45	Anand	Amber tournament	D38 Queen's Gambit Declined		
8	Kramnik	Anand	1998	½–½	23		Amber tournament	D85 Grünfeld Defence		
9	Anand	Kramnik	1998	½–½	20		Chess Classics Giants	E34 Nimzo-Indian Defence		
10	Anand	Kramnik	1998	½–½	36		Chess Classics Giants	C42 Petrov's Defence		
11	Kramnik	Anand	1998	½–½	33		Chess Classics Giants	A35 English Opening		
12	Kramnik	Anand	1998	½–½	22		Chess Classics Giants	C42 Petrov's Defence		
13	Kramnik	Anand	1998	½–½	44		Chess Classics Giants	A17 English Opening		
14	Anand	Kramnik	1998	½–½	59		Chess Classics Giants	C24 Bishop's Opening		
15	Anand	Kramnik	1998	1–0	37	Anand	Villarrobledo op	B31 Sicilian Defence		
16	Kramnik	Anand	1999	½–½	54		Amber tournament	D27 Queen's Gambit Accepted		
17	Anand	Kramnik	1999	½–½	19		Siemens Giants	C42 Petrov's Defence		
18	Kramnik	Anand	1999	½–½	49		Siemens Giants	E34 Nimzo-Indian Defence		
19	Anand	Kramnik	1999	1–0	27	Anand	Siemens Giants	C42 Petrov's Defence		
20	Kramnik	Anand	1999	½–½	34		Siemens Giants	E16 Queen's Indian Defence		
21	Anand	Kramnik	2000	½–½	38		Amber tournament	B33 Sicilian Defence		
22	Anand	Kramnik	2000	½–½	25		Fujitsu Siemens Giants	B33 Sicilian Defence		
23	Kramnik	Anand	2000	½–½	39		Fujitsu Siemens Giants	D12 Slav Defence		
24	Kramnik	Anand	2001	½–½	76		Amber tournament	D27 Queen's Gambit Accepted		
25	Kramnik	Anand	2001	½–½	34		Mainz CC Champions Duel (1)	D27 Queen's Gambit Accepted		
26	Anand	Kramnik	2001	½–½	14		Mainz CC Champions Duel (2)	C67 Ruy Lopez: Berlin Defence		
27	Anand	Kramnik	2001	0–1	27	Kramnik	Mainz CC Champions Duel (3)	C67 Ruy Lopez: Berlin Defence		
28	Kramnik	Anand	2001	½–½	25		Mainz CC Champions Duel (4)	D27 Queen's Gambit Accepted		
29	Kramnik	Anand	2001	0–1	47	Anand	Mainz CC Champions Duel (5)	D29 Queen's Gambit Accepted		
30	Anand	Kramnik	2001	½–½	23		Mainz CC Champions Duel (6)	C78 Ruy Lopez		
31	Anand	Kramnik	2001	½–½	46		Mainz CC Champions Duel (7)	B33 Sicilian Defence		
32	Kramnik	Anand	2001	½–½	42		Mainz CC Champions Duel (8)	D27 Queen's Gambit Accepted		
33	Kramnik	Anand	2001	½–½	26		Mainz CC Champions Duel (9)	D27 Queen's Gambit Accepted		
34	Anand	Kramnik	2001	½–½	19		Mainz CC Champions Duel (10)	C42 Petrov's Defence		
35	Kramnik	Anand	2002	½–½	24		Russia vs the World	D17 Slav Defence		
36	Anand	Kramnik	2003	½–½	40		Amber tournament	B30 Sicilian Defence		
37	Kramnik	Anand	2003	½–½	19		Cap d'Agde	B85 Sicilian Defence		
38	Anand	Kramnik	2003	1–0	46	Anand	Cap d'Agde	B33 Sicilian Defence		
39	Anand	Kramnik	2004	1–0	43	Anand	Amber tournament	B30 Sicilian Defence		
40	Kramnik	Anand	2004	½–½	19		Dortmund Playoff	C88 Ruy Lopez: Anti-Marshall		
41	Anand	Kramnik	2004	1–0	31	Anand	Dortmund Playoff	B90 Sicilian Najdorf		
42	Kramnik	Anand	2005	½–½	24		Amber tournament	C67 Ruy Lopez: Berlin Defence		
43	Anand	Kramnik	2007	½–½	56		Amber tournament	C88 Ruy Lopez: Anti-Marshall		
44	Kramnik	Anand	2008	0–1	43	Anand	Amber tournament	E15 Queen's Indian Defence		
45	Kramnik	Anand	2009	½–½	15		Amber tournament	E32 Nimzo-Indian Defence		
46	Anand	Kramnik	2009	½–½	18		Zurich Champions Rapid	B01 Scandinavian Defence		
47	Anand	Kramnik	2011	½–½	37		Amber tournament	D02 Queen's Gambit Accepted		
48	Anand	Kramnik	2011	½–½	34		Botvinnik Memorial	C60 Ruy Lopez		
49	Kramnik	Anand	2011	½–½	41		Botvinnik Memorial	D43 Queen's Gambit Declined		
50	Kramnik	Anand	2013	½–½	39		London Chess Classic (Knockout)	D43 Semi-Slav Defence		
51	Anand	Kramnik	2013	0–1	27	Kramnik	London Chess Classic (Knockout)	D32 Tarrasch Defense		
52	Kramnik	Anand	2015	½–½	26		Zurich Chess Challenge	A07 King's Indian Attack		
53	Kramnik	Anand	2016	1–0	51	Kramnik	Your Next Move	A14 English Opening		
54	Kramnik	Anand	2017	1–0	39	Kramnik	Your Next Move	C50 Giuoco Piano		
55	Anand	Kramnik	2018	½–½	16		Tal Memorial	C53 Giuoco Piano		
56	Anand	Kramnik	2018	1–0	41	Anand	Grand Chess Tour, Paris	C67 Ruy Lopez: Berlin Defence		
57	Anand	Kramnik	2019	1–0	44	Anand	Levitov Chess Week, Amsterdam	C50 Giuoco Piano		
58	Anand	Kramnik	2020	0–1	63	Kramnik	Legends of Chess (2020)	C11 French Defence		
59	Kramnik	Anand	2020	1–0	32	Kramnik	Legends of Chess (2020)	A08 King's Indian Attack		
60	Anand	Kramnik	2020	½–½	40		Legends of Chess (2020)	C50 Giuoco Piano		
61	Anand	Kramnik	2023	½–½	26		Levitov Chess Week	B40 Sicilian Defence		
62	Kramnik	Anand	2023	½–½	61		Levitov Chess Week	C53 Giuoco Piano		

== Blitz ==
	White	Black	Year	Result	Moves	Winner	Tournament	Opening	Notes	Reference
1	Anand	Kramnik	1994	½–½	71		PCA/Intel-GP	B31 Sicilian Defence		
2	Kramnik	Anand	1994	0–1	53	Anand	PCA/Intel-GP	A07 King's Indian Attack		
3	Kramnik	Anand	1994	1–0	60	Kramnik	Intel World Chess Express Challenge	B33 Sicilian Defence		
4	Anand	Kramnik	1998	½–½	40		Chess Classics Giants	E04 Catalan Opening		
5	Kramnik	Anand	1998	½–½	38		Chess Classics Giants	E34 Nimzo-Indian Defence		
6	Kramnik	Anand	1998	0–1	37	Anand	Chess Classics Giants	A35 English Opening		
7	Kramnik	Anand	1999	½–½	29		Wijk aan Zee	E06 Catalan Opening		
8	Anand	Kramnik	2001	1–0	28	Anand	Mainz CC Champions Duel	B33 Sicilian Defence		
9	Kramnik	Anand	2001	½–½	38		Mainz CC Champions Duel	D27 Queen's Gambit Accepted		
10	Kramnik	Anand	2007	1–0	21	Kramnik	Moscow Blitz World Championship 2007	D13 Slav Defence		
11	Anand	Kramnik	2007	½–½	17		Moscow Blitz World Championship 2007	C65 Ruy Lopez: Berlin Defence		
12	Kramnik	Anand	2009	½–½	45		Moscow Blitz World Championship 2009	A38 English Opening		
13	Anand	Kramnik	2009	1–0	40	Anand	Moscow Blitz World Championship 2009	B01 Scandinavian Defence		
14	Kramnik	Anand	2013	1–0	52	Kramnik	Zurich Chess Challenge	A20 English Opening		
15	Anand	Kramnik	2013	0–1	45	Kramnik	Zurich Chess Challenge	C42 Petrov Defence		
16	Kramnik	Anand	2013	½–½	43		Tal Memorial	A08 King's Indian Attack		
17	Kramnik	Anand	2014	1–0	41	Kramnik	London Chess Classic	A06 Zukertort Opening		
18	Anand	Kramnik	2014	0–1	28	Kramnik	London Chess Classic	A09 Réti Opening		
19	Anand	Kramnik	2015	1–0	31	Anand	Zurich Chess Challenge	A09 Réti Opening		
20	Kramnik	Anand	2016	½–½	54		Zurich Chess Challenge	D03 Torre Attack		
21	Kramnik	Anand	2016	½–½	31		Zurich Chess Challenge	A06 Zukertort Opening		
22	Kramnik	Anand	2016	½–½	48		Your Next Move	A04 Zukertort Opening		
23	Anand	Kramnik	2016	½–½	44		Your Next Move	C50 Giuoco Piano		
24	Anand	Kramnik	2016	½–½	31		Tal Memorial	C50 Giuoco Piano		
25	Anand	Kramnik	2017	1–0	42	Anand	Zurich Chess Challenge	C65 Ruy Lopez: Berlin Defence		
26	Anand	Kramnik	2017	0–1	44	Kramnik	Stavanger	C65 Ruy Lopez: Berlin Defence		
27	Anand	Kramnik	2017	½–½	70		Your Next Move	C67 Ruy Lopez: Berlin Defence		
28	Kramnik	Anand	2017	½–½	31		Your Next Move	B10 Caro–Kann Defence		
29	Kramnik	Anand	2018	1–0	25	Kramnik	Tal Memorial	C50 Giuoco Piano		
30	Kramnik	Anand	2018	½–½	38		Grand Chess Tour, Paris	B13 Caro–Kann Defence		
31	Anand	Kramnik	2018	½–½	37		Grand Chess Tour, Paris	C67 Ruy Lopez: Berlin Defence		
32	Kramnik	Anand	2019	1–0	57	Kramnik	Levitov Chess Week, Amsterdam	A20 English Opening		

== Blindfold games ==
	White	Black	Year	Result	Moves	Winner	Tournament	Opening	Notes	Reference
1	Anand	Kramnik	1994	1–0	50	Anand	Amber tournament	B33 Sicilian Defence		
2	Kramnik	Anand	1995	½–½	51		Amber tournament	D38 Queen's Gambit Declined		
3	Anand	Kramnik	1996	0–1	40	Kramnik	Amber tournament	B66 Sicilian Defence		
4	Kramnik	Anand	1997	0–1	29	Anand	Amber tournament	D27 Queen's Gambit Accepted		
5	Anand	Kramnik	1998	½–½	67		Amber tournament	B31 Sicilian Defence		
6	Anand	Kramnik	1999	0–1	24	Kramnik	Amber tournament	B56 Sicilian Defence		
7	Kramnik	Anand	2000	1–0	32	Kramnik	Amber tournament	D43 Semi-Slav Defence		
8	Anand	Kramnik	2001	½–½	24		Amber tournament	D56 Queen's Gambit Declined		
9	Anand	Kramnik	2003	½–½	26		Amber tournament	B90 Sicilian Najdorf		
10	Kramnik	Anand	2004	½–½	18		Amber tournament	B83 Sicilian Defence		
11	Anand	Kramnik	2005	1–0	52	Anand	Amber tournament	C42 Petrov's Defence		
12	Kramnik	Anand	2007	1–0	30	Kramnik	Amber tournament	E20 Nimzo-Indian Defence		
13	Kramnik	Anand	2008	½–½	23		Amber tournament	E20 Nimzo-Indian Defence		
14	Anand	Kramnik	2009	1–0	30	Anand	Amber tournament	C42 Petrov's Defence		
15	Kramnik	Anand	2011	½–½	41		Amber tournament	A35 English Opening		

== Advanced Chess ==
	White	Black	Year	Result	Moves	Winner	Tournament	Opening	Notes	Reference
1	Kramnik	Anand	2002	½–½	33		León	D37 Queen's Gambit Declined		
2	Anand	Kramnik	2002	½–½	20		León	E15 Queen's Indian Defence		
3	Kramnik	Anand	2002	1–0	37	Kramnik	León	D27 Queen's Gambit Accepted		
4	Anand	Kramnik	2002	½–½	48		León	D37 Queen's Gambit Declined		
5	Kramnik	Anand	2002	½–½	38		León	D27 Queen's Gambit Accepted		
6	Anand	Kramnik	2002	½–½	20		León	C67 Ruy Lopez: Berlin Defence		
7	Anand	Kramnik	2007	½–½	24		Moscow	C67 Ruy Lopez: Berlin Defence		
8	Kramnik	Anand	2007	½–½	24		Moscow	D43 Semi-Slav Defence		

== No Castling Chess ==
	White	Black	Year	Result	Moves	Winner	Tournament	Opening	Notes	Reference
1	Anand	Kramnik	2021	1–0	66	Anand	Anand-Kramnik No-Castling Match	A30 English, Symmetrical		
2	Kramnik	Anand	2021	½–½	39		Anand-Kramnik No-Castling Match	A30 English, Symmetrical		
3	Anand	Kramnik	2021	½–½	61		Anand-Kramnik No-Castling Match	A30 English, Symmetrical		
4	Kramnik	Anand	2021	½–½	40		Anand-Kramnik No-Castling Match	D32 Tarrasch Defence		
