= Marshall Gambit =

The Marshall Gambit may refer to a number of chess openings named after the American chess master Frank Marshall. It is not to be confused with the Marshall Defense.

== Common meanings ==
- 1.d4 d5 2.c4 e6 3.Nc3 c6 4.e4 dxe4 5.Nxe4 Bb4+ 6.Bd2 (a line reachable from the Queen's Gambit Declined or, less often, the Slav Defense)
- 1.e4 d5 2.exd5 Nf6 (a line of the Scandinavian Defense; it may also be called the Modern Scandinavian)
- 1.d4 d5 2.c4 e6 3.Nc3 c5 4.cxd5 exd5 5.e4 (a line of the Tarrasch Defense)
- 1.e4 e6 2.d4 d5 3.Nc3 c5 (a line of the French Defense)
- 1.e4 e5 2.Nf3 Nc6 3.Bb5 a6 4.Ba4 Nf6 5.0-0 Be7 6.Re1 b5 7.Bb3 0-0 8.c3 d5 (a line of the Ruy Lopez; more often called the Marshall Attack)
