= Queen's Gambit =

Chess opening

Position: a8 black rook, b8 black knight, c8 black bishop, d8 black queen, e8 black king, f8 black bishop, g8 black knight, h8 black rook, a7 black pawn, b7 black pawn, c7 black pawn, e7 black pawn, f7 black pawn, g7 black pawn, h7 black pawn, d5 black pawn, c4 white pawn, d4 white pawn, a2 white pawn, b2 white pawn, e2 white pawn, f2 white pawn, g2 white pawn, h2 white pawn, a1 white rook, b1 white knight, c1 white bishop, d1 white queen, e1 white king, f1 white bishop, g1 white knight, h1 white rook
- Moves: 1.d4 d5 2.c4
- ECO: D06–D69
- Origin: late 15th century
- Parent: Closed Game

The Queen's Gambit is the chess opening that begins with the moves:

1. d4 d5
2. c4

It is one of the oldest openings and is still commonly played today. It is traditionally described as a gambit because White appears to sacrifice the c-pawn; however, Black cannot retain the pawn without incurring a disadvantage. 2...dxc4 is the Queen's Gambit Accepted (QGA), where Black temporarily gives up the center to obtain freer development. Alternatives to 2...dxc4 can be collectively termed the Queen's Gambit Declined (QGD). 2...e6 is Black's classical main reply; the QGD term is often used to refer only to play after 2...e6. 2...c6, the Slav Defense, is the main alternative to 2...e6 for declining the gambit.

Black frequently plays to maintain a pawn on d5; the game will be cramped, but exchanging pieces and using pawn breaks at c5 and e5 can free Black's game. Alternatively, Black may delay ...dxc4 until White has already played Bd3 or Be2, as this would win a tempo if White plays Bxc4, moving the bishop a second time. Particularly in the Slav, Black may plan to play ...dxc4 without tempo anyway; a pawn on c6 can support ...b5, threatening to hold on to the pawn on c4.

== History ==
The Queen's Gambit is one of the oldest known openings in chess. It was mentioned in the Göttingen manuscript of 1490 and was later analyzed by Gioachino Greco in the 17th century. In the 18th century, it was recommended by Philipp Stamma of Aleppo and has sometimes been called the Aleppo Gambit in his honor. During the early period of modern chess, queen pawn openings were not in fashion, and the Queen's Gambit did not become commonplace until the 1873 tournament in Vienna.

As Wilhelm Steinitz and Siegbert Tarrasch developed chess theory and increased the appreciation of positional play, the Queen's Gambit grew more popular, reaching its zenith in the 1920s and 1930s, and it was played in all but 2 of 34 games in the 1927 World Championship match between José Raúl Capablanca and Alexander Alekhine.

After the resumption of international chess activity following World War II, it was less frequently seen as many players moved away from symmetrical openings, tending to use an Indian Defence to combat queen pawn openings; however, it is still frequently played.

== 2...dxc4: Queen's Gambit Accepted ==
Position: a8 black rook, b8 black knight, c8 black bishop, d8 black queen, e8 black king, f8 black bishop, g8 black knight, h8 black rook, a7 black pawn, b7 black pawn, c7 black pawn, e7 black pawn, f7 black pawn, g7 black pawn, h7 black pawn, c4 black pawn, d4 white pawn, a2 white pawn, b2 white pawn, e2 white pawn, f2 white pawn, g2 white pawn, h2 white pawn, a1 white rook, b1 white knight, c1 white bishop, d1 white queen, e1 white king, f1 white bishop, g1 white knight, h1 white rook

Position after 2...dxc4

The Queen's Gambit Accepted occurs after 2...dxc4 (ECO D20–D29). Though less popular than the Queen's Gambit Declined, it nevertheless has a solid reputation. White's most common reply is 3.Nf3, which has the main line 3...Nf6 4.e3 e6 5.Bxc4 c5 6.0-0 a6, reachable by many possible move orders, such as from the 3.e3 line if Black avoids ...e5. Also common are 3.e4, the Central Variation, along with the calmer 3.e3. 3.Nc3 is an uncommon alternative.

Because Black cannot retain the pawn without incurring a disadvantage, the description of 2.c4 as a gambit has been questioned. An opening trap where Black tries clinging onto the pawn now on c4 was pointed out by Alessandro Salvio in 1604. After 3.e3, Black defends the pawn with 3...b5?, after 4.a4 c6 5.axb5 cxb5??, the a8–h1 diagonal is fatally weakened and 6.Qf3 Nc6 (preventing 7.Qxa8) 7.Qxc6 wins a minor piece. The rare 3...Be6 may be able to hold the pawn at some cost, however. 3.Qa4+ and 4.Qxc4 is another option, though rare as recapturing with the bishop avoids losing tempo; after 3.Qa4+ Nc6, 4.Qxc4 is weak due to 4...Qxd4, but after 4.Nf3 Bg4 (intending ...Bxf3), 5.e3 leaves Black with no way to prevent White from recapturing the pawn, though Black can double White's pawns.

== 2...e6: Queen's Gambit Declined ==
Position: a8 black rook, b8 black knight, c8 black bishop, d8 black queen, e8 black king, f8 black bishop, g8 black knight, h8 black rook, a7 black pawn, b7 black pawn, c7 black pawn, f7 black pawn, g7 black pawn, h7 black pawn, e6 black pawn, d5 black pawn, c4 white pawn, d4 white pawn, a2 white pawn, b2 white pawn, e2 white pawn, f2 white pawn, g2 white pawn, h2 white pawn, a1 white rook, b1 white knight, c1 white bishop, d1 white queen, e1 white king, f1 white bishop, g1 white knight, h1 white rook

Position after 2...e6

Technically, any Black response other than 2...dxc4 (or another line with an early ...dxc4 that transposes into the QGA) is a Queen's Gambit Declined, but lines other than 2...e6 (ECO D30–D69), Black's traditional main reply, are often treated as separate openings.

There are so many lines after 2...e6 that many of them are distinctive enough to warrant separate treatment. Examples include the Exchange Variation, the Orthodox Defense, the Tarrasch Defense, and the Semi-Tarrasch Defense. Also, if White chooses to fianchetto the king's bishop, the game may transpose into the Catalan Opening.

The line is also frequently reached from the Indian Defense after 1.d4 Nf6 2.c4 e6 3.Nf3 d5; White's move 3.Nf3 avoids the Nimzo-Indian Defense (1.d4 Nf6 2.c4 e6 3.Nc3 Bb4), but prevents White from transposing to the Exchange Variation (1.d4 d5 2.c4 e6 3.Nc3 Nf6 4.cxd5)'s main line due to the delay of Nc3.

== 2...c6: Slav Defense ==
Position: a8 black rook, b8 black knight, c8 black bishop, d8 black queen, e8 black king, f8 black bishop, g8 black knight, h8 black rook, a7 black pawn, b7 black pawn, e7 black pawn, f7 black pawn, g7 black pawn, h7 black pawn, c6 black pawn, d5 black pawn, c4 white pawn, d4 white pawn, a2 white pawn, b2 white pawn, e2 white pawn, f2 white pawn, g2 white pawn, h2 white pawn, a1 white rook, b1 white knight, c1 white bishop, d1 white queen, e1 white king, f1 white bishop, g1 white knight, h1 white rook

Position after 2...c6

The Slav Defense, 2...c6 (ECO D10–D19), a solid response, though many variations are very tactical. It has gradually become comparably popular to 2...e6. A benefit is avoiding the Exchange QGD; on the other hand, ...c6 does not aid Black in developing any pieces. The main line continues 3.Nf3 Nf6 4.Nc3. At this point, 4...dxc4, the Classical Slav, is common, with the main line 5.a4 Bf5 and then 6.Ne5 or 6.e3, and there is also 4...a6, the Chebanenko Slav. More common than either of the two is 4...e6, which reaches the Semi-Slav Defense.

Also of note are 4.e3, the Quiet Slav, a positional variation, along with 3.cxd5 or 4.cxd5, the Exchange Variation of the Slav; both can be used to avoid the Semi-Slav. 3.Nc3 often transposes to 3.Nf3 lines, though White can avoid this.

Black can also play 3...dxc4 and then try to hold on to the extra pawn. 3.Nc3 gives Black the option to play 3...dxc4 and then 4...b5 with the threat of ...b4, kicking White's knight, and it is more common than 3...dxc4 after 3.Nf3, which is still playable, tending to continue 4.e3 Be6 or 4.e3 b5. Both lines may be also viewed as transposing to the Queen's Gambit Accepted (2...dxc4), from which they may also be reached.

== ...c6 and ...e6 together: Semi-Slav Defense ==
Position: a8 black rook, b8 black knight, c8 black bishop, d8 black queen, e8 black king, f8 black bishop, h8 black rook, a7 black pawn, b7 black pawn, f7 black pawn, g7 black pawn, h7 black pawn, c6 black pawn, e6 black pawn, f6 black knight, d5 black pawn, c4 white pawn, d4 white pawn, c3 white knight, f3 white knight, a2 white pawn, b2 white pawn, e2 white pawn, f2 white pawn, g2 white pawn, h2 white pawn, a1 white rook, c1 white bishop, d1 white queen, e1 white king, f1 white bishop, h1 white rook

After 2...c6 3.Nf3 Nf6 4.Nc3 e6

The Semi-Slav Defense (ECO D43-D49), often analyzed separately from both the Slav Defense and the 2...e6 QGD, combines the moves ...c6 and ...e6, along with ...Nf6 (omitting ...Nf6 is the Triangle System, which can lead to the Noteboom Variation). It can be reached from a variety of move orders. The most common is 2...c6 3.Nf3 Nf6 4.Nc3 e6; White could deviate with the Exchange Slav or Quiet Slav.

The Semi-Slav can also be reached from 2...e6. There is 2...e6 3.Nc3 c6 4.Nf3 Nf6, but White could avoid it with 4.e4, the Marshall Gambit; Black could also play 2...e6 3.Nc3 Nf6, hoping for 4.Nf3 c6, but this allows the Exchange QGD. Though it may not end up mattering, 2...c6 encourages 3.Nf3, while 2...e6 encourages 3.Nc3.

Like many QGD lines, the Semi-Slav is frequently reached when White avoids the Nimzo-Indian Defence (1.d4 Nf6 2.c4 e6 3.Nc3 Bb4) via 3.Nf3; 3...d5 4.Nc3 c6 reaches the Semi-Slav, though White may instead play 4.g3, transposing to the Catalan Opening.

== Black's second-move alternatives ==
Position: a8 black rook, b8 black knight, c8 black bishop, d8 black queen, e8 black king, f8 black bishop, g8 black knight, h8 black rook, a7 black pawn, b7 black pawn, c7 black pawn, f7 black pawn, g7 black pawn, h7 black pawn, d5 black pawn, e5 black pawn, c4 white pawn, d4 white pawn, a2 white pawn, b2 white pawn, e2 white pawn, f2 white pawn, g2 white pawn, h2 white pawn, a1 white rook, b1 white knight, c1 white bishop, d1 white queen, e1 white king, f1 white bishop, g1 white knight, h1 white rook

Position after 2...e5

Black has some other less common alternatives:

- 2...e5, the Albin Countergambit (D08–D09), a sharp attempt by Black to gain the initiative. It is uncommon in top-level chess but can be a dangerous weapon in club play.
- 2...Nc6, the Chigorin Defense (D07), which takes the game away from the normal positional channels of the QGD and has been favored by Alexander Morozevich at the top level; it appears to be playable for Black.
- 2...Bf5, the Baltic Defense (D06), an offbeat but playable line.
- 2...c5, the Austrian Defense (D06), a symmetrical response that is rarely played. Although it has not been definitely refuted, the play seems to favor White. It has been tried by Hikaru Nakamura.
- 2...Nf6?!, the Marshall Defense (D06), named after Frank Marshall, who first devised the move; he briefly played it in the 1920s before abandoning it.
- 2...g6?!, which was occasionally played by Alexander Alekhine (D06). White can gain the advantage by 3.cxd5 Qxd5 (3...Nf6 4.Qa4 +/−) 4.Nc3 Qa5 5.Nf3 Bg7 6.Bd2 c6 7.e4 Qb6 8.Bc4! Bxd4 9.Nxd4 Qxd4 10.Qb3 Qg7 11.0-0 +/− (Minev).
