= Austrian Defense =

Position: a8 black rook, b8 black knight, c8 black bishop, d8 black queen, e8 black king, f8 black bishop, g8 black knight, h8 black rook, a7 black pawn, b7 black pawn, e7 black pawn, f7 black pawn, g7 black pawn, h7 black pawn, c5 black pawn, d5 black pawn, c4 white pawn, d4 white pawn, a2 white pawn, b2 white pawn, e2 white pawn, f2 white pawn, g2 white pawn, h2 white pawn, a1 white rook, b1 white knight, c1 white bishop, d1 white queen, e1 white king, f1 white bishop, g1 white knight, h1 white rook
- Moves: 1.d4 d5 2.c4 c5
- ECO: D06
- Origin: 1604, Alessandro Salvio
- Named after: Austria
- Parent: Queen's Gambit
- Synonym: Symmetrical Defense

The Austrian Defense is a chess opening that begins with the moves:

1. d4 d5
2. c4 c5

The Austrian Defense is an uncommon variation of the Queen's Gambit, and is also referred to as the Symmetrical Defense to the Queen's Gambit. Black poses the question of whether equalizing is possible by simply copying White's moves. Most opening theoreticians believe that White should gain the advantage and at best Black is playing for a draw.

The opening was first described in print by Alessandro Salvio in 1604. The name arose because it was studied by Austrian chess players including Hans Haberditz (c. 1901–57), Hans Müller (1896–1971), and GM Ernst Grünfeld.

Grandmaster Hikaru Nakamura employed the unusual opening a few times in 2023 and 2024. With the opening, he drew former world champion Magnus Carlsen in the Champions Chess Tour 2023 finals and beat reigning world champion Ding Liren in Norway Chess 2024. He employed a similar opening in the Candidates Tournament 2024, beating R Praggnanandhaa with the black pieces in a game beginning with 1.d4 d5 2.Nf3 Nf6 3.c4 c5. Nakamura defeated Luca Moroni and drew against Bogdan-Daniel Deac with the opening in the 2024 World Rapid Chess Championship.

== 3.cxd5 ==
White often replies 3.cxd5, but other moves are playable and may lead to transpositions into more well-known variations such as the Queen's Gambit Accepted and the Tarrasch Defense. After 3.cxd5, it is not advisable for Black to play 3...Qxd5, because either 4.Nf3 cxd4 5.Nc3 Qa5 6.Nxd4 or 5...Qd8 6.Qxd4 Qxd4 7.Nxd4 give White a big lead in development. Instead, Black should play 3...Nf6 intending to recapture on d5 with the knight. White should be able to maintain the advantage with either 4.Nf3 or 4.e4. Possible continuations are 4.Nf3 cxd4 5.Nxd4 Nxd5 6.e4 Nc7 or 4.e4 Nxe4 5.dxc5 Nxc5 6.Nc3 e6.
