= Marshall Defense =

Chess opening

Position: a8 black rook, b8 black knight, c8 black bishop, d8 black queen, e8 black king, f8 black bishop, h8 black rook, a7 black pawn, b7 black pawn, c7 black pawn, e7 black pawn, f7 black pawn, g7 black pawn, h7 black pawn, f6 black knight, d5 black pawn, c4 white pawn, d4 white pawn, a2 white pawn, b2 white pawn, e2 white pawn, f2 white pawn, g2 white pawn, h2 white pawn, a1 white rook, b1 white knight, c1 white bishop, d1 white queen, e1 white king, f1 white bishop, g1 white knight, h1 white rook
- Moves: 1.d4 d5 2.c4 Nf6
- ECO: D06
- Named after: Frank Marshall
- Parent: Queen's Gambit

The Marshall Defense is a chess opening that begins with the moves:

1. d4 d5
2. c4 Nf6?!

The Marshall Defense is a fairly dubious variation of the Queen's Gambit Declined. It was played by Frank Marshall in the 1920s, but he gave it up after losing with it to Alekhine at Baden-Baden in 1925. It is no longer used by experienced players (Watson 2007:12–14).

White may choose to ignore Black's provocative second move with 3.Nc3, which will usually transpose into normal lines of the Queen's Gambit Declined (after 3...e6), the Slav Defence (after 3...c6), the Queen's Gambit Accepted (after 3...dxc4) or the Grünfeld Defence (after 3...g6).

== 3.cxd5 Nxd5 ==
=== 4.e4 ===
A common continuation, though White may be playing e4 too early. If Black deviates with 3...Qxd5, 4.Nc3 Qa5 5.Bd2 is strong, e.g. 5...Qb6 6.Nf3 Qxb2?? 7.Rb1 Qa3 8.Nb5, winning (Alburt 2009:38).

After Black retreats the knight with 4...Nf6, White can continue 5.e5 attacking the knight, or they can get a clear advantage with 5.f3, or a small advantage with 5.Nc3 e5! 6.Nf3! (6.dxe5 Qxd1+ 7.Kxd1 Ng4!) 6...exd4! 7.Qxd4 (Alburt 2009:38).

=== 4.Nf3! ===
This controls the e5 square, threatening to play 5.e4 without allowing a follow-up e7-e5 break for Black. After 4...Bf5, White achieves a large advantage with 5.Qb3 e6 (5...Nc6 6.Nbd2! Nb6 7.e4 Bg6 8.d5 is very strong) 6.Nc3 (avoiding the complications of 6.Qxb7 Nd7; 6.Nbd2 is also good) 6...Nc6 7.e4 Nxc3 8.exf5 Nd5 9.a3 (avoiding 9.Qxb7 Bb4+) Qd6 10.Qxb7 Rb8 11.Qa6 Be7 12.Bb5 Rb6 13.Bxc6+ Rxc6 14.Qd3 exf5 15.0-0 0-0 16.Qxf5, as in Lipnitsky–Bondarevsky, USSR championship 1951. White also achieves a "pleasant advantage" with 5.Nbd2 Nf6 6.Qb3 Qc8 7.g3 (Benjamin). In fact Stockfish 16 NNUE at depth 49 has heavy preference for the latter (+0.8 to +0.3).

== 3.cxd5 c6 4.dxc6 Nxc6 (Tan Gambit) ==
Black can play a gambit line where Black generally follows up with ...e5, causing a pawn exchange in the center and the removal of the queens. White retains a small advantage in the queenless middlegame that follows.

== 3.cxd5 g6 ==
A tricky move order by Black, trying to transpose into the Grünfeld Defence if White plays natural developing moves, e.g., 4.Nc3 Nxd5 is the Grünfeld Exchange Variation. But if White plays 4.Qa4+, Black cannot regain the pawn on d5 and will not have enough compensation for the pawn.

== See also ==
- List of chess openings
- List of chess openings named after people
