= Chigorin =

Chigorin can refer to:

- Mikhail Chigorin (1850–1908), Russian chess player
- Chigorin Defense, a chess opening
- Chigorin Memorial, a chess tournament
- 7268 Chigorin, a minor planet
