= Queen's Gambit Declined =

Chess opening

Position: a8 black rook, b8 black knight, c8 black bishop, d8 black queen, e8 black king, f8 black bishop, g8 black knight, h8 black rook, a7 black pawn, b7 black pawn, c7 black pawn, f7 black pawn, g7 black pawn, h7 black pawn, e6 black pawn, d5 black pawn, c4 white pawn, d4 white pawn, a2 white pawn, b2 white pawn, e2 white pawn, f2 white pawn, g2 white pawn, h2 white pawn, a1 white rook, b1 white knight, c1 white bishop, d1 white queen, e1 white king, f1 white bishop, g1 white knight, h1 white rook
- Moves: 1.d4 d5 2.c4 e6
- ECO: D30–D69
- Parent: Queen's Gambit
- Synonym: QGD

The Queen's Gambit Declined (or QGD) is a chess opening, a primary line of the Queen's Gambit beginning with the moves:

1. d4 d5
2. c4 e6

Instead of taking the pawn offered by White on c4 (the Queen's Gambit Accepted), Black defends the d-pawn with 2...e6 (the "Orthodox" Queen's Gambit Declined). "Queen's Gambit Declined" usually refers to 2...e6; see "Other second moves for Black" for additional options that decline White's offered pawn.

The most common continuation is 3.Nc3 Nf6 (covered by ECO codes D35–D69), after which White may continue with 4.Bg5, leading to the Classical Variation and others; 4.cxd5, the Exchange Variation; or 4.Nf3, the Three Knights Variation. 3...c6, 3...c5, and 3...Be7 are also common for Black, as is 3.Nf3 for White.

The Queen's Gambit Declined can be also reached by transposition from a number of other move orders. A common example is 1.d4 Nf6 2.c4 e6 3.Nf3 d5, where White avoids the Nimzo-Indian Defense (3.Nc3 Bb4). Other examples include 1.d4 e6 2.c4 d5 (from the Franco-Indian Defense); 1.c4 e6 2.Nc3 d5 3.d4 (from the English Opening); 1.Nf3 d5 2.c4 e6 3.d4 (from the Reti Opening); and so on.

The opening has a long history of play. It became particularly common in the early 20th century. Of the 34 games played in the 1927 World Championship between Alexander Alekhine and José Raúl Capablanca, all except the first and third began with the Queen's Gambit Declined.

== General concepts ==
Playing 2...e6 releases Black's dark-squared bishop, while obstructing Black's light-squared bishop. By declining White's temporary pawn sacrifice, Black erects a solid position; the pawns on d5 and e6 give Black a foothold in the center. The Queen's Gambit Declined has the reputation of being one of Black's most reliable defenses to 1.d4. In this situation, White will try to exploit the passivity of Black's light-squared bishop, and Black will try to release it, trade it, or prove that, while passive, the bishop has a useful defensive role.

An eventual ...dxc4 by Black will surrender the center to White, and Black will usually not do this unless Black can extract a concession, usually in the form of gaining a tempo, by capturing on c4 only after White has played Bd3 first. In the Orthodox Line, the fight for the tempo revolves around White's efforts to play all other useful developing moves prior to playing Bd3. Black will often aim for the pawn break ...c5 in this opening, which often leads to one or the other side accepting isolated or hanging pawns in exchange for dynamic compensation.

== Traditional line: 3.Nc3 Nf6 4.Bg5 ==
Position: a8 black rook, b8 black knight, c8 black bishop, d8 black queen, e8 black king, f8 black bishop, h8 black rook, a7 black pawn, b7 black pawn, c7 black pawn, f7 black pawn, g7 black pawn, h7 black pawn, e6 black pawn, f6 black knight, d5 black pawn, g5 white bishop, c4 white pawn, d4 white pawn, c3 white knight, a2 white pawn, b2 white pawn, e2 white pawn, f2 white pawn, g2 white pawn, h2 white pawn, a1 white rook, d1 white queen, e1 white king, f1 white bishop, g1 white knight, h1 white rook

Traditional line: 1.d4 d5 2.c4 e6 3.Nc3 Nf6 4.Bg5

4.Bg5 was the most common move in the 20th century, although 4.cxd5 (the Exchange Variation) has gradually become more common. Black's most common reply is 4...Be7, where play typically continues 5.e3 0-0 6.Nf3 (or 5.Nf3 0-0 6.e3). The line is also commonly reached by transposition from the Three Knights Variation after 4.Nf3 Be7 5.Bg5, though this gives White the option of playing the Harrwitz Attack (5.Bf4) instead.

If Black chooses to continue with 6...h6, this is considered the Neo-Orthodox Variation, which leads to the Tartakower Variation, Lasker Variation, and Anti-Tartakower Variation; these variations are also commonly reached via 5...h6 6.Bh4 0-0 7.Nf3 (or 7.e3, if Nf3 was played earlier in the game), but 4...h6 is weak due to 5.Bxf6, where 5...gxf6 6.cxd5 exd5 gives Black doubled isolated pawns and 5...Qxf6 6.cxd5 exd5 7.Nxd5 loses a pawn. Omitting ...h6 is characteristic of the Classical Variation.

=== Classical Variation: 4...Be7 5.e3 0-0 6.Nf3 Nbd7 ===
Position: a8 black rook, c8 black bishop, d8 black queen, f8 black rook, g8 black king, a7 black pawn, b7 black pawn, c7 black pawn, d7 black knight, e7 black bishop, f7 black pawn, g7 black pawn, h7 black pawn, e6 black pawn, f6 black knight, d5 black pawn, g5 white bishop, c4 white pawn, d4 white pawn, c3 white knight, e3 white pawn, f3 white knight, a2 white pawn, b2 white pawn, f2 white pawn, g2 white pawn, h2 white pawn, a1 white rook, d1 white queen, e1 white king, f1 white bishop, h1 white rook

Classical Variation: 6.Nf3 Nbd7

The Classical Variation, also known as the Orthodox Defense, most often continues 7.Rc1 c6, where White's most common move is then 8.Bd3. After 8...dxc4 9.Bxc4, Black has surrendered the center and stands somewhat cramped, but has succeeded in making White lose a tempo by playing Bd3 before Bxc4. White will try to use the advantage in space to attack, whereas Black will try to keep White at bay while striking back at the center.

José Raúl Capablanca introduced the idea here of the freeing maneuver 9...Nd5 10.Bxe7 Qxe7 11.0-0 Nxc3 12.Rxc3 e5 13.dxe5 Nxe5 14.Nxe5 Qxe5 15.f4 Qe7, which leads to a number of central exchanges, though Black must exercise care even in the wake of this simplification. This line was once so frequently played that it has a separate code (D69) in ECO, though the lack of active counter play for Black has made the main line of the Orthodox a backwater in modern practice.

Alternative lines for Black include 9...b5, kicking White's bishop and allowing Black to fianchetto with ...Bb7, and 7...a6. For White, the most common deviations from the main line with 7.Rc1 c6 8.Bd3 are 7.Qc2 and 8.Qc2, both frequently played by Akiba Rubinstein. An immediate 7.Bd3 is also possible, but Black benefits from being able to play ...c5 without having already played ...c6. 7.cxd5 tends to lead to common lines in the Exchange Variation after 7...exd5, but also permits 7...Nxd5.

=== Tartakower Variation: 6...h6 7.Bh4 b6 ===
Position: a8 black rook, b8 black knight, c8 black bishop, d8 black queen, f8 black rook, g8 black king, a7 black pawn, c7 black pawn, e7 black bishop, f7 black pawn, g7 black pawn, b6 black pawn, e6 black pawn, f6 black knight, h6 black pawn, d5 black pawn, c4 white pawn, d4 white pawn, h4 white bishop, c3 white knight, e3 white pawn, f3 white knight, a2 white pawn, b2 white pawn, f2 white pawn, g2 white pawn, h2 white pawn, a1 white rook, d1 white queen, e1 white king, f1 white bishop, h1 white rook

Tartakower Variation: 6...h6 7.Bh4 b6

The Tartakower Variation or Tartakower–Makogonov–Bondarevsky System (TMB system) is one of the most solid continuations for Black.

=== Lasker Variation: 6...h6 7.Bh4 Ne4 ===
Position: a8 black rook, b8 black knight, c8 black bishop, d8 black queen, f8 black rook, g8 black king, a7 black pawn, b7 black pawn, c7 black pawn, e7 black bishop, f7 black pawn, g7 black pawn, e6 black pawn, h6 black pawn, d5 black pawn, c4 white pawn, d4 white pawn, e4 black knight, h4 white bishop, c3 white knight, e3 white pawn, f3 white knight, a2 white pawn, b2 white pawn, f2 white pawn, g2 white pawn, h2 white pawn, a1 white rook, d1 white queen, e1 white king, f1 white bishop, h1 white rook

Lasker Variation: 6...h6 7.Bh4 Ne4

The Lasker Variation, is also a solid line, often leading to the exchange of two sets of minor pieces. It was this line that Viswanathan Anand chose in the final game of the World Chess Championship 2010 in order to defeat Veselin Topalov and retain the world championship. The typical continuation is 8.Bxe7 Qxe7.

=== Anti-Tartakower Variation: 6...h6 7.Bxf6 ===
Also known as the Anti-Tartakower–Makogonov–Bondarevsky (Anti-TMB), this line was extensively tested in the Kasparov–Karpov matches in 1980s. To this day Black has no problems in this line despite being tested at the highest levels. More recently, Boris Gelfand defended the Black side of this variation in the 2011 candidates matches which eventually he went on to win. For example, in the third round of the final candidate match, he forced White to accept a draw in 14 moves with a very strong novelty.

=== Cambridge Springs Defense: 4...Nbd7 5.e3 c6 6.Nf3 Qa5 ===
Position: a8 black rook, c8 black bishop, e8 black king, f8 black bishop, h8 black rook, a7 black pawn, b7 black pawn, d7 black knight, f7 black pawn, g7 black pawn, h7 black pawn, c6 black pawn, e6 black pawn, f6 black knight, a5 black queen, d5 black pawn, g5 white bishop, c4 white pawn, d4 white pawn, c3 white knight, e3 white pawn, f3 white knight, a2 white pawn, b2 white pawn, f2 white pawn, g2 white pawn, h2 white pawn, a1 white rook, d1 white queen, e1 white king, f1 white bishop, h1 white rook

Cambridge Springs Defense: 4...Nbd7 5.e3 c6 6.Nf3 Qa5

4...Nbd7 sets up the Elephant Trap, but if White avoids it, the common continuation 5.e3 c6 6.Nf3 allows Black to play 6...Qa5 (ECO D52), the Cambridge Spring Defense. The first recorded use of the Cambridge Springs was by Emanuel Lasker in 1892. The name derives from a 1904 tournament in Cambridge Springs, Pennsylvania, where it was played several times. Alexander Alekhine defeated José Raúl Capablanca with it in the World Chess Championship 1927. Magnus Carlsen used it in a victory against Boris Gelfand in the World Chess Championship 2013 Candidates Tournament.

Black breaks the pin of the knight to the queen on the h4–d8 diagonal and pins White's knight on c3 to the king. If Black later plays dxc4, there may be tactics involving discovered attacks on White's bishop on g5. Black intends ...Bb4 and possibly ...Ne4, with pressure along the a5–e1 diagonal. 7.Nd2 is the main reply, countering Black's pressure along the diagonal. 7.cxd5, resolving central tension, is also possible, with the most common continuation being 7...Nxd5 8.Qd2 Bb4 9.Rc1. 7.Bxf6 is another option, preventing any discovered attack tactics on the bishop.

The line contains several traps White can fall into. For example, after 7.Nd2 Bb4 8.Qc2 0-0, 9.Bd3?? loses since 9...dxc4! (threatening ...Qxg5) 10.Bxf6 cxd3! (a zwischenzug) 11.Qxd3 Nxf6 wins a piece for Black.

White can avoid the Cambridge Springs by playing cxd5 earlier, transposing to the Exchange Variation after 5.cxd5 exd5 or 6.cxd5 exd5. Another alternative is 6.a3, which has been played by Capablanca.

== Exchange Variation: 4.cxd5 ==
Position: a8 black rook, b8 black knight, c8 black bishop, d8 black queen, e8 black king, f8 black bishop, h8 black rook, a7 black pawn, b7 black pawn, c7 black pawn, f7 black pawn, g7 black pawn, h7 black pawn, f6 black knight, d5 black pawn, g5 white bishop, d4 white pawn, c3 white knight, a2 white pawn, b2 white pawn, e2 white pawn, f2 white pawn, g2 white pawn, h2 white pawn, a1 white rook, d1 white queen, e1 white king, f1 white bishop, g1 white knight, h1 white rook

Exchange Variation, main line: 3.Nc3 Nf6 4.cxd5 exd5 5.Bg5

After 4.cxd5, the usual continuation is 4...exd5 5.Bg5. White has a pawn majority in the center, but Black has a pawn majority on the queenside. This pawn structure gives White the opportunity to either advance the center pawns by means of Nge2, f2–f3, followed by e2–e4, or play for a minority attack by means of the plan Rb1, followed by b2–b4–b5, then bxc6 in order to create a weak pawn at c6. While Black can play ...cxb5, or recapture on c6 with a piece, each of these possibilities is even less desirable than the backward pawn in the open file. For Black, exchanging at d5 has released the light-squared bishop and opened the e-file, giving Black the use of e4 as a springboard for central and kingside play. While chances are balanced, Black is usually more or less forced to use the superior activity to launch a piece attack on White's king, as the long-term chances in the QGD Exchange structure favor White. The following games are model games for White:

- Central pawn advance: Carlsen–Jakovenko, Nanjing 2009
- Minority attack: Evans–Opsahl, Dubrovnik 1950

Black's fifth move must respond to White's threat of 6.Bxf6 Qxf6 7.Nxd5, winning a pawn, or 6...gxf6, inflicting doubled isolated pawns. The most common replies, 5...c6 and 5...Be7, usually transpose to the same line. 5...Bb4+, 5...Nbd7, and 5...Be6 are notable alternatives. After 5...c6, the main line continues 6.e3 Be7 7.Bd3 Nbd7 8.Qc2 0-0 (or 8...Nh5), followed by either 9.Nf3 or 9.Nge2, and then, regardless of White's ninth move, 9...Re8 10.0-0 Nf8, followed by 11.h3 (for 9.Nf3) and 11.f3 (for 9.Nge2). The resulting two positions are also often reached by many other move orders (such as castling earlier). After this point, many different moves are common, with no clear main line.

Two possible deviations from the line include 6.Qc2, the Reshevsky Variation (although transposition back to the main line is common), and 6...Bf5, which often leads to an endgame after 7.Qf3 Bg6 8.Bxf6 Qxf6 9.Qxf6 gxf6. Another possibility is to play ...h6 at some point. The most common such line, also commonly reached by other move orders, is 5...c6 6.e3 h6 7.Bh4 Be7 8.Bd3 0-0 9.Nge2 Re8 10.0-0 Nbd7 11.Qc2. Although 11...Nf8, similarly to the lines without ...h6, is possible, 11...Nh5, 11...Ne4, and 11...a5 are more commonly played.

Black also has the option to play 4...Nxd5 instead of the more common 4...exd5, which most often ends up transposing to the Semi-Tarrasch Defense after 5.e4 Nxc3 6.bxc3 c5 7.Nf3, though White may play 7.Rb1 or 7.a3.

Position: a8 black rook, c8 black bishop, d8 black queen, e8 black rook, f8 black knight, g8 black king, a7 black pawn, b7 black pawn, e7 black bishop, f7 black pawn, g7 black pawn, h7 black pawn, c6 black pawn, f6 black knight, d5 black pawn, g5 white bishop, d4 white pawn, c3 white knight, d3 white bishop, e3 white pawn, f3 white knight, h3 white pawn, a2 white pawn, b2 white pawn, c2 white queen, f2 white pawn, g2 white pawn, a1 white rook, f1 white rook, g1 white king

Main line with Nf3: 4.cxd5 exd5 5.Bg5 c6 6.e3 Be7 7.Bd3 Nbd7 8.Qc2 0-0 9.Nf3 Re8 10.0-0 Nf8 11.h3

Position: a8 black rook, c8 black bishop, d8 black queen, e8 black rook, f8 black knight, g8 black king, a7 black pawn, b7 black pawn, e7 black bishop, f7 black pawn, g7 black pawn, h7 black pawn, c6 black pawn, f6 black knight, d5 black pawn, g5 white bishop, d4 white pawn, c3 white knight, d3 white bishop, e3 white pawn, f3 white pawn, a2 white pawn, b2 white pawn, c2 white queen, e2 white knight, g2 white pawn, h2 white pawn, a1 white rook, f1 white rook, g1 white king

Main line with Nge2: 4.cxd5 exd5 5.Bg5 c6 6.e3 Be7 7.Bd3 Nbd7 8.Qc2 0-0 9.Nge2 Re8 10.0-0 Nf8 11.f3

Position: a8 black rook, c8 black bishop, d8 black queen, e8 black rook, g8 black king, a7 black pawn, b7 black pawn, d7 black knight, e7 black bishop, f7 black pawn, g7 black pawn, c6 black pawn, f6 black knight, h6 black pawn, d5 black pawn, d4 white pawn, h4 white bishop, c3 white knight, d3 white bishop, e3 white pawn, a2 white pawn, b2 white pawn, c2 white queen, e2 white knight, f2 white pawn, g2 white pawn, h2 white pawn, a1 white rook, f1 white rook, g1 white king

Main line with ...h6: 5.Bg5 c6 6.e3 h6 7.Bh4 Be7 8.Bd3 Nbd7 9.Nge2 0-0 10.0-0 Re8 11.Qc2

Position: a8 black rook, b8 black knight, e8 black king, f8 black bishop, h8 black rook, a7 black pawn, b7 black pawn, f7 black pawn, h7 black pawn, c6 black pawn, f6 black pawn, g6 black bishop, d5 black pawn, d4 white pawn, c3 white knight, e3 white pawn, a2 white pawn, b2 white pawn, f2 white pawn, g2 white pawn, h2 white pawn, a1 white rook, e1 white king, f1 white bishop, g1 white knight, h1 white rook

Endgame line: 5.Bg5 c6 6.e3 Bf5 7.Qf3 Bg6 8.Bxf6 Qxf6 9.Qxf6 gxf6

== Three Knights Variation: 4.Nf3 ==
Position: a8 black rook, b8 black knight, c8 black bishop, d8 black queen, e8 black king, f8 black bishop, h8 black rook, a7 black pawn, b7 black pawn, c7 black pawn, f7 black pawn, g7 black pawn, h7 black pawn, e6 black pawn, f6 black knight, d5 black pawn, c4 white pawn, d4 white pawn, c3 white knight, f3 white knight, a2 white pawn, b2 white pawn, e2 white pawn, f2 white pawn, g2 white pawn, h2 white pawn, a1 white rook, c1 white bishop, d1 white queen, e1 white king, f1 white bishop, h1 white rook

Three Knights Variation: 1.d4 d5 2.c4 e6 3.Nc3 Nf6 4.Nf3

The Three Knights Variation of the QGD is more often reached from the move order 1.d4 Nf6 2.c4 e6 3.Nf3 d5 4.Nc3, played to avoid the Nimzo-Indian Defense (from White's point of view) and the Exchange Variation of the QGD (from Black's point of view). Black has a few options in response. After 4...Be7, 5.Bg5 transposes to the traditional line of the QGD, but White can avoid this, most notably with 5.Bf4.

=== Ragozin Variation: 4...Bb4 ===
Position: a8 black rook, b8 black knight, c8 black bishop, d8 black queen, e8 black king, h8 black rook, a7 black pawn, b7 black pawn, c7 black pawn, f7 black pawn, g7 black pawn, h7 black pawn, e6 black pawn, f6 black knight, d5 black pawn, b4 black bishop, c4 white pawn, d4 white pawn, c3 white knight, f3 white knight, a2 white pawn, b2 white pawn, e2 white pawn, f2 white pawn, g2 white pawn, h2 white pawn, a1 white rook, c1 white bishop, d1 white queen, e1 white king, f1 white bishop, h1 white rook

Ragozin Variation: 3.Nc3 Nf6 4.Nf3 Bb4

The Ragozin Variation (ECO code D37–D39) occurs after Black plays 4...Bb4 in the Three Knights Variation. White has the main options of 5.Bg5, 5.cxd5, and 5.Qa4+, the Alekhine Variation, with the usual continuation 5...Nc6 6.e3 0-0 and then 7.Qc2 or 7.Bd2.

After 5.Bg5, Black has the options of 5...h6, 5...Nbd7, and 5...dxc4, transposing to the Vienna Variation, with the common continuation 6.e4 c5 7.Bxc4 cxd4 8.Nxd4. After 5...h6, the usual continuation is 6.Bxf6 (6.Bh4 is well met by 6...dxc4) Qxf6 7.e3 (or 7.Qa4+ Nc6 8.e3 0-0) 0-0 8.Rc1 dxc4 9.Bxc4 c5 10.0-0 cxd4 11.Ne4 (or 11.Nxd4) Qe7. 5...Nbd7 most often continues 6.e3 c5, the Westphalian Variation, or the same moves after an exchange, 6.cxd5 exd5 7.e3 c5.

After 5.cxd5, the usual continuation is 5...exd5 6.Bg5 h6 7.Bh4 0-0 8.e3 Bf5. This avoids the potential transposition into the Vienna.

=== Semi-Slav Defense: 4...c6 ===
The Semi-Slav Defense occurs after Black plays 4...c6 in the Three Knights Variation.

=== Semi-Tarrasch Defense: 4...c5 ===
The Semi-Tarrasch Defense occurs after Black plays 4...c5 in the Three Knights Variation.

An important line in this variation is the Endgame Line where the game continues: 5.cxd5 cxd4 6.Qxd4 exd5 7.e4 dxe4 8.Qxd8+ Kxd8 where the queens get traded off in a similar fashion to the Endgame in the Berlin Defense, resulting in a drawish position. This line has been played by top grandmasters such as Wesley So, Anish Giri, and Magnus Carlsen aiming for a draw. There is also the Exchange Variation where the game continues 5.cxd5 Nxd5 6.e4 Nxc3 7.bxc3 cxd4 8.cxd4, which has been used by the likes of Ding Liren, Anish Giri, Vladimir Kramnik, and Magnus Carlsen.

=== Harrwitz Attack: 4...Be7 5.Bf4 ===
Position: a8 black rook, b8 black knight, c8 black bishop, d8 black queen, e8 black king, h8 black rook, a7 black pawn, b7 black pawn, c7 black pawn, e7 black bishop, f7 black pawn, g7 black pawn, h7 black pawn, e6 black pawn, f6 black knight, d5 black pawn, c4 white pawn, d4 white pawn, f4 white bishop, c3 white knight, f3 white knight, a2 white pawn, b2 white pawn, e2 white pawn, f2 white pawn, g2 white pawn, h2 white pawn, a1 white rook, d1 white queen, e1 white king, f1 white bishop, h1 white rook

Harrwitz Attack: 3.Nc3 Nf6 4.Nf3 Be7 5.Bf4

This variation is also a popular line. Placing the bishop on g5 allows Black to exchange more freely with moves like Nf6–e4, as seen in the Lasker Defense. The move Bf4 is designed to restrict Black's opportunities in this way, as well as reducing opportunities to gain the bishop pair. Play usually continues with 5...0-0 6.e3 c5 7.dxc5 Bxc5. Peter Leko, usually an e4 player, used this variation as White to beat Vladimir Kramnik in their 2004 World Championship Match. Bobby Fischer played the line in game 14 of his 1972 match against Boris Spassky.

=== Vienna Variation: 4...dxc4 ===
The Vienna Variation occurs after Black plays 4...dxc4 in the Three Knights Variation. The main line of the Vienna continues as 5.e4 Bb4 6.Bg5. White's pawns or pieces occupy the central squares in exchange for long-term pawn structure weaknesses. An instance of Vienna Variation played at the highest level was Fine–Euwe, AVRO 1938. The Quiet Variation of the Vienna Variation occurs after 5.e3.

== Black's third-move alternatives ==
After 3.Nc3, Black has several common alternatives to 3...Nf6:

- 3...c5 (the Tarrasch Defense). Striking back in the center early, it often leads to Black accepting an isolated d-pawn.
- 3...Be7 (the Alatortsev Variation). Sometimes, this transposes to positions arising from 3...Nf6, and has the advantage, from Black's standpoint, of avoiding the main line of the Exchange Variation arising after 3...Nf6 4.cxd5 exd5 5.Bg5. In many cases, the game will simply transpose into the traditional line after 4.Nf3 Nf6 5.Bg5, or, White can play 4.cxd5 exd5 5.Bf4 c6 6.e3. The continuation 6...Bf5 7.g4 became a topical line after its adoption by Mikhail Botvinnik in his 1963 title match with Tigran Petrosian. 6.Qc2 is also popular. These exchange lines are more popular than transposing at top level.
- 3...c6, usually signalling Black's intention to enter the Noteboom Variation after 4.Nf3 dxc4, or the Semi-Slav after 4...Nf6. White has alternatives to 4.Nf3 such as the Marshall Gambit 4.e4; or 4.e3 which may lead to the Stonewall Dutch after ...f5 or transpose to the Semi-Slav.
- 3...Bb4 (the Accelerated Ragozin) intends to transpose to the Ragozin Variation, although White has various options to avoid this transposition. For instance, one drawback with this move is that after the moves 4.a3 Bxc3+ 5.bxc3 Nf6 6.e3 it allows White to achieve the pawn structure seen in the game Botvinnik–Capablanca, AVRO 1938, which is often considered somewhat advantageous for White.
- 3...a6 (the Janowski Variation), which gained some interest in 2021 after being adopted by World Champion Magnus Carlsen. The move threatens ...dxc4 followed by ...b5, attempting to hold on to the pawn. For this reason, White usually plays cxd5 first.

== White's third-move alternatives ==
White also commonly plays 3.Nf3, which usually transposes to the Three Knights Variation after 3...Nf6 4.Nc3 or to the Catalan Opening after 3...Nf6 4.g3. 3...Nf6 4.Bg5 usually transposes to the traditional line after 4...Be7 5.Nc3 or 4...Be7 5.e3 0-0 6.Nc3. Black also may play 3...c6, an accelerated Semi-Slav Defense; 3...c5, the Pseudo-Tarrasch Defense; 3...dxc4, transposing to the Queen's Gambit Accepted; or 3...a6.

Other third moves for White are rare:

- 3.g3 usually transposes to the Catalan Opening after 3...Nf6, but gives Black the option of an independent line typically continuing 3...dxc4 4.Bg2 c5 5.Nf3 (or 4.Nf3 and 5.Bg2) Nc6 6.Qa4 cxd4 7.Nxd4 Qxd4 8.Bxc6+ Bd7 9.Be3 Bxc6 (or 9...Qd6) 10.Qxc6+ bxc6 (or 10...Qd7 11.Qxc4) 11.Bxd4 Bb4+.
- 3.e3 is a quiet line where White's queen's bishop is kept inside White's pawn chain. Play may transpose to the Semi-Slav Defense if Black plays ...c6.
- 3.cxd5 is a rarely seen accelerated version of the Exchange Variation. After the usual 3...exd5 4.Nc3, Black can transpose to the standard Exchange Variation with 4...Nf6, but 4...c6 is a common move that avoids transposing.

== Black's second-move alternatives ==
In its broadest sense, the Queen's Gambit Declined is any variation of the Queen's Gambit in which Black does not play ...dxc4 (the Queen's Gambit Accepted); however, variations other than 2...e6 have their own names and are usually treated separately. They include:

- 1.d4 d5 2.c4 c6 – Slav Defense
- 1.d4 d5 2.c4 e5 – Albin Countergambit
- 1.d4 d5 2.c4 Nc6 – Chigorin Defense
- 1.d4 d5 2.c4 Bf5 – Baltic Defense
- 1.d4 d5 2.c4 c5 – Austrian Defense
- 1.d4 d5 2.c4 Nf6 – Marshall Defense

== See also ==
- Queen's Gambit
- Queen's Gambit Accepted
