= Baltic Defense =

Position: a8 black rook, b8 black knight, d8 black queen, e8 black king, f8 black bishop, g8 black knight, h8 black rook, a7 black pawn, b7 black pawn, c7 black pawn, e7 black pawn, f7 black pawn, g7 black pawn, h7 black pawn, d5 black pawn, f5 black bishop, c4 white pawn, d4 white pawn, a2 white pawn, b2 white pawn, e2 white pawn, f2 white pawn, g2 white pawn, h2 white pawn, a1 white rook, b1 white knight, c1 white bishop, d1 white queen, e1 white king, f1 white bishop, g1 white knight, h1 white rook
- Moves: 1.d4 d5 2.c4 Bf5
- ECO: D06
- Named after: Paul Keres
- Parent: Queen's Gambit
- Synonyms: Grau Defense; Sahovic Defense

The Baltic Defense (also known as the Grau Defense, or the Sahovic Defense) is a chess opening characterized by the moves:

1. d4 d5
2. c4 Bf5!?

The Baltic is an unusual variation of the Queen's Gambit Declined (QGD). In most defenses to the QGD, Black has difficulties developing their queen bishop. This opening takes a radical approach to the problem by bringing out the queen bishop immediately, but exposes it to the latent threat of e2-e4, for example 3. cxd5 Qxd5? 4. Nc3 Qa5 5. Bd2 followed by 6. e4 hitting the bishop gives White a strong advantage.

The Baltic has not found widespread acceptance among chess masters, but some world-class players have used it including grandmasters Paul Keres and Alexei Shirov.

The ECO code for the Baltic Defense is D06.

== White responses ==
White has several replies to this opening, including 3.Nf3, 3.cxd5, 3.Qb3, and 3.Nc3. Play might continue:

=== 3.Nf3 e6 ===
- 4.Qb3 Nc6
- 4.e3 Nf6 5.Qb3 Nc6
- 4.Nc3 Nf6 5.Qb3 Nc6
- 4.cxd5 exd5 5.Qb3 Nc6

=== 3.cxd5 ===
3...Bxb1 4.Qa4+ Qd7 5.Qxd7+ Nxd7 6.Rxb1 Ngf6 7.Nf3

=== 3.Qb3 ===
3...e5 4.Qxb7 Nd7 5.Nc3 exd4 6.Nxd5 Bd6 7.Nf3 is recommended by John L. Watson

=== 3.Nc3 ===
3...e6 4.Qb3?! (4.Nf3) Nc6 5.cxd5 exd5 6.Qxd5? (a mistake, as Black has 6...Nxd4, winning) Qxd5 7.Nxd5 0-0-0−+

== See also ==
- Keres Defence (1.d4 e6 2.c4 Bb4+)
- List of chess openings
- List of chess openings named after places
