= Semi-Tarrasch Defense =

Chess opening

Position: a8 black rook, b8 black knight, c8 black bishop, d8 black queen, e8 black king, f8 black bishop, h8 black rook, a7 black pawn, b7 black pawn, f7 black pawn, g7 black pawn, h7 black pawn, e6 black pawn, f6 black knight, c5 black pawn, d5 black pawn, c4 white pawn, d4 white pawn, c3 white knight, f3 white knight, a2 white pawn, b2 white pawn, e2 white pawn, f2 white pawn, g2 white pawn, h2 white pawn, a1 white rook, c1 white bishop, d1 white queen, e1 white king, f1 white bishop, h1 white rook
- Moves: 1.d4 d5 2.c4 e6 3.Nc3 Nf6 4.Nf3 c5
- ECO: D40–D42
- Named after: Siegbert Tarrasch
- Parent: Queen's Gambit Declined

The Semi-Tarrasch Defense is a chess opening characterized by the following moves:

1. d4 d5
2. c4 e6
3. Nc3 Nf6
4. Nf3 c5

The Semi-Tarrasch is a variation of the Queen's Gambit Declined. Unlike the regular Tarrasch Defense (3...c5), in the Semi-Tarrasch, Black does not need to accept an isolated pawn, since 5...Nxd5 can be played after the usual 5.cxd5. On the other hand, Black cedes a spatial advantage to White.

In the Encyclopedia of Chess Openings (ECO), the Semi-Tarrasch Defense has codes D40 through D42.

== Main line: 5.cxd5 Nxd5 ==
Position: a8 black rook, b8 black knight, c8 black bishop, d8 black queen, e8 black king, f8 black bishop, h8 black rook, a7 black pawn, b7 black pawn, f7 black pawn, g7 black pawn, h7 black pawn, e6 black pawn, c5 black pawn, d5 black knight, d4 white pawn, c3 white knight, f3 white knight, a2 white pawn, b2 white pawn, e2 white pawn, f2 white pawn, g2 white pawn, h2 white pawn, a1 white rook, c1 white bishop, d1 white queen, e1 white king, f1 white bishop, h1 white rook

Main line after 5.cxd5 Nxd5

After 5.cxd5 Nxd5 (diagram), White tends to play either 6.e4 or 6.e3, which lead to different types of middlegame play.

=== 6.e4 ===
Position: a8 black rook, b8 black knight, c8 black bishop, d8 black queen, f8 black rook, g8 black king, a7 black pawn, b7 black pawn, f7 black pawn, g7 black pawn, h7 black pawn, e6 black pawn, d4 white pawn, e4 white pawn, f3 white knight, a2 white pawn, d2 white queen, f2 white pawn, g2 white pawn, h2 white pawn, a1 white rook, e1 white king, f1 white bishop, h1 white rook

6.e4 Nxc3 7.bxc3 cxd4 8.cxd4 Bb4+ 9.Bd2 Bxd2+ 10.Qxd2 0-0

6.e4 is the most common move and tends to continue 6...Nxc3 7.bxc3 cxd4 8.cxd4 Bb4+ 9.Bd2 Bxd2+ 10.Qxd2 0-0 (diagram). This leads to a position similar to the Exchange Variation of the Grünfeld Defense, but with Black having exchanged the dark-squared bishop rather than fianchettoing it. It is a more drawish line than 6.e3.

== 5.cxd5 cxd4 ==
Position: a8 black rook, b8 black knight, d8 black king, f8 black bishop, h8 black rook, a7 black pawn, b7 black pawn, g7 black pawn, h7 black pawn, e6 black pawn, f6 black knight, e4 black pawn, c3 white knight, a2 white pawn, b2 white pawn, f2 white pawn, g2 white pawn, h2 white pawn, a1 white rook, c1 white bishop, e1 white king, f1 white bishop, h1 white rook

5.cxd5 cxd4 6.Qxd4 exd5 7.e4 dxe4 8.Qxd8+ Kxd8 9.Ng5 Be6 10.Nxe6+ fxe6

5...cxd4 is a line advocated by Wesley So that has become more popular over time. The most common continuation is 6.Qxd4 exd5 7.e4 (7.Bg5 is a common alternative) dxe4 8.Qxd8+ Kxd8 9.Ng5 Be6 10.Nxe6+ fxe6 (diagram), leading to an endgame where Black has doubled isolated pawns.

== 5.cxd5 exd5 ==
Position: a8 black rook, b8 black knight, d8 black queen, e8 black king, f8 black bishop, h8 black rook, a7 black pawn, b7 black pawn, f7 black pawn, g7 black pawn, h7 black pawn, e6 black bishop, f6 black knight, c5 black pawn, d5 black pawn, g5 white bishop, d4 white pawn, c3 white knight, f3 white knight, a2 white pawn, b2 white pawn, e2 white pawn, f2 white pawn, g2 white pawn, h2 white pawn, a1 white rook, d1 white queen, e1 white king, f1 white bishop, h1 white rook

5.cxd5 exd5 6.Bg5 Be6

5...exd5 is a rarer option for Black than 5...Nxd5 and 5...cxd4. The usual continuation is 6.Bg5 Be6 (diagram), a line also frequently reached from the regular Tarrasch Defense, though in the Tarrasch Black typically avoids this line by delaying ...Nf6. White can also opt to transpose to the main line of the Tarrasch by playing 6.g3 instead of 6.Bg5, transposing after the usual 6...Nc6.

== Symmetrical Variation: 5.e3 ==
Position: a8 black rook, c8 black bishop, d8 black queen, e8 black king, f8 black bishop, h8 black rook, a7 black pawn, b7 black pawn, f7 black pawn, g7 black pawn, h7 black pawn, c6 black knight, e6 black pawn, f6 black knight, c5 black pawn, d5 black pawn, c4 white pawn, d4 white pawn, c3 white knight, e3 white pawn, f3 white knight, a2 white pawn, b2 white pawn, f2 white pawn, g2 white pawn, h2 white pawn, a1 white rook, c1 white bishop, d1 white queen, e1 white king, f1 white bishop, h1 white rook

5.e3 Nc6

In the Symmetrical Variation (ECO D40), White forgoes the fianchetto, with direct play against d5, opting to keep central tension for the moment by playing 5.e3. 5...Nc6 is the normal continuation (diagram). From this position, White may choose to inflict the isolated pawn on Black, accept the weakness themself in return for active piece play, or play 6.a3 with a view to dxc5 followed by b4 and Bb2, aiming for positions in which the extra tempo will come in useful if Black keeps the symmetry. 6...Ne4, therefore, once chosen by Bobby Fischer in his Candidates Match with Tigran Petrosian in 1971, gives a different turn.

This variation was also played by Ding Liren against Hikaru Nakamura in their last game of the 2022 Candidates Tournament. Ding qualified for the 2023 World Chess Championship in part thanks to this victory, and later became the world chess champion.

== See also ==
- List of chess openings
- List of chess openings named after people
