= Amber chess tournament =

Event in Monte Carlo (1992–2011)

The Amber chess tournament (officially the Amber Rapid and Blindfold Chess Tournament, previously Melody Amber) was an annual invitation-only event for some of the world's best players, from 1992 to 2011. Since the second edition, the event uniquely combined blindfold chess and speed chess, and has been held in Monte Carlo. The tournament was sponsored by the Dutch businessman and world champion of correspondence chess, Joop van Oosterom. Named after his daughter, the tournament was usually held in March. Her sister was the eponym to the Crystal Kelly Cup.

Vladimir Kramnik won the most overall titles with six. Viswanathan Anand is the only player to have won both the rapid and blindfold events in the same year (he did it twice, in 1997 and 2005). The most rapid events have been won by Anand (nine times), and the most blindfold events have been won by Kramnik (nine times).

Nearly every world class player has played in the tournament but Garry Kasparov. Vassily Ivanchuk is the only player to have played in all 20 editions.

The 20th Amber Tournament was held in 2011 in Monaco, as was the first Amber Tournament.

== Winners ==
| # | Year | Overall winner | Rapidplay Winner | Blindfold Winner |
|---|---|---|---|---|
| 1 | 1992 | Vassily Ivanchuk | | (no blindfold) |
| 2 | 1993 | Ljubomir Ljubojević | Ljubomir Ljubojević | Viswanathan Anand; Anatoly Karpov |
| 3 | 1994 | Viswanathan Anand | Viswanathan Anand; Vladimir Kramnik | Viswanathan Anand |
| 4 | 1995 | Anatoly Karpov | Anatoly Karpov | Vladimir Kramnik |
| 5 | 1996 | Vladimir Kramnik | Viswanathan Anand; Vassily Ivanchuk | Vladimir Kramnik |
| 6 | 1997 | Viswanathan Anand | Viswanathan Anand | Viswanathan Anand |
| 7 | 1998 | Alexei Shirov; Vladimir Kramnik | Vassily Ivanchuk; Alexei Shirov | Vladimir Kramnik |
| 8 | 1999 | Vladimir Kramnik | Viswanathan Anand | Vladimir Kramnik; Alexei Shirov; Veselin Topalov |
| 9 | 2000 | Alexei Shirov | Alexei Shirov | Vladimir Kramnik |
| 10 | 2001 | Vladimir Kramnik; Veselin Topalov | Boris Gelfand; Vladimir Kramnik | Veselin Topalov |
| 11 | 2002 | Alexander Morozevich | Boris Gelfand | Alexander Morozevich |
| 12 | 2003 | Viswanathan Anand | Evgeny Bareev | Vladimir Kramnik |
| 13 | 2004 | Alexander Morozevich; Vladimir Kramnik | Viswanathan Anand | Alexander Morozevich |
| 14 | 2005 | Viswanathan Anand | Viswanathan Anand | Viswanathan Anand |
| 15 | 2006 | Viswanathan Anand; Alexander Morozevich | Viswanathan Anand | Alexander Morozevich |
| 16 | 2007 | Vladimir Kramnik | Viswanathan Anand | Vladimir Kramnik |
| 17 | 2008 | Levon Aronian | Levon Aronian | Levon Aronian; Vladimir Kramnik; Alexander Morozevich; Veselin Topalov |
| 18 | 2009 | Levon Aronian | Viswanathan Anand; Levon Aronian; Gata Kamsky | Levon Aronian; Magnus Carlsen; Vladimir Kramnik |
| 19 | 2010 | Magnus Carlsen; Vassily Ivanchuk | Magnus Carlsen; Vassily Ivanchuk | Alexander Grischuk |
| 20 | 2011 | Levon Aronian | Magnus Carlsen | Levon Aronian |

== Melody Amber 1992 ==
The first tournament was played from 3 to 13 February 1992 in Roquebrune-Cap-Martin as a double round robin competition of rapid chess. The first round-robin was won by Viswanathan Anand, undefeated with a score of 8/11, closely followed by Vassily Ivanchuk with 7.5 points. In the second half of the tournament, Victor Korchnoi appeared the strongest with 7/11. Anand lost three games (including his final round game with white against Larsen), which allowed Ivanchuk to take over the lead in the very last round. Ivanchuk scored a total of 14/22. Anand finished second with 13.5 points, while Anatoly Karpov, Victor Korchnoi and Ljubomir Ljubojević shared third place with 12.5/22. Remarkable was the participation of 15-year-old Judit Polgár, who finished 10th. The oldest player in the field was Korchnoi aged 61, while prize money totalled US$100,000 with US$20,000 for the winner.

A separate Blitz tournament, with the same participants plus Larry Christiansen and Susan Polgar, was played on 7 February. Ljubojević won with a score of 10/13.

== Tournament books ==
A book on the first tournament was published in 1992.

In the following six years (1993–1998), tournament books were published on each tournament for that year. The first four were produced by Guido den Broeder, in association with chess grandmasters such as John van der Wiel and John Nunn. The last two were produced by Dagobert Kohlmeyer, in association with John Nunn.
