= Alexander Morozevich =

Russian chess grandmaster (born 1977)

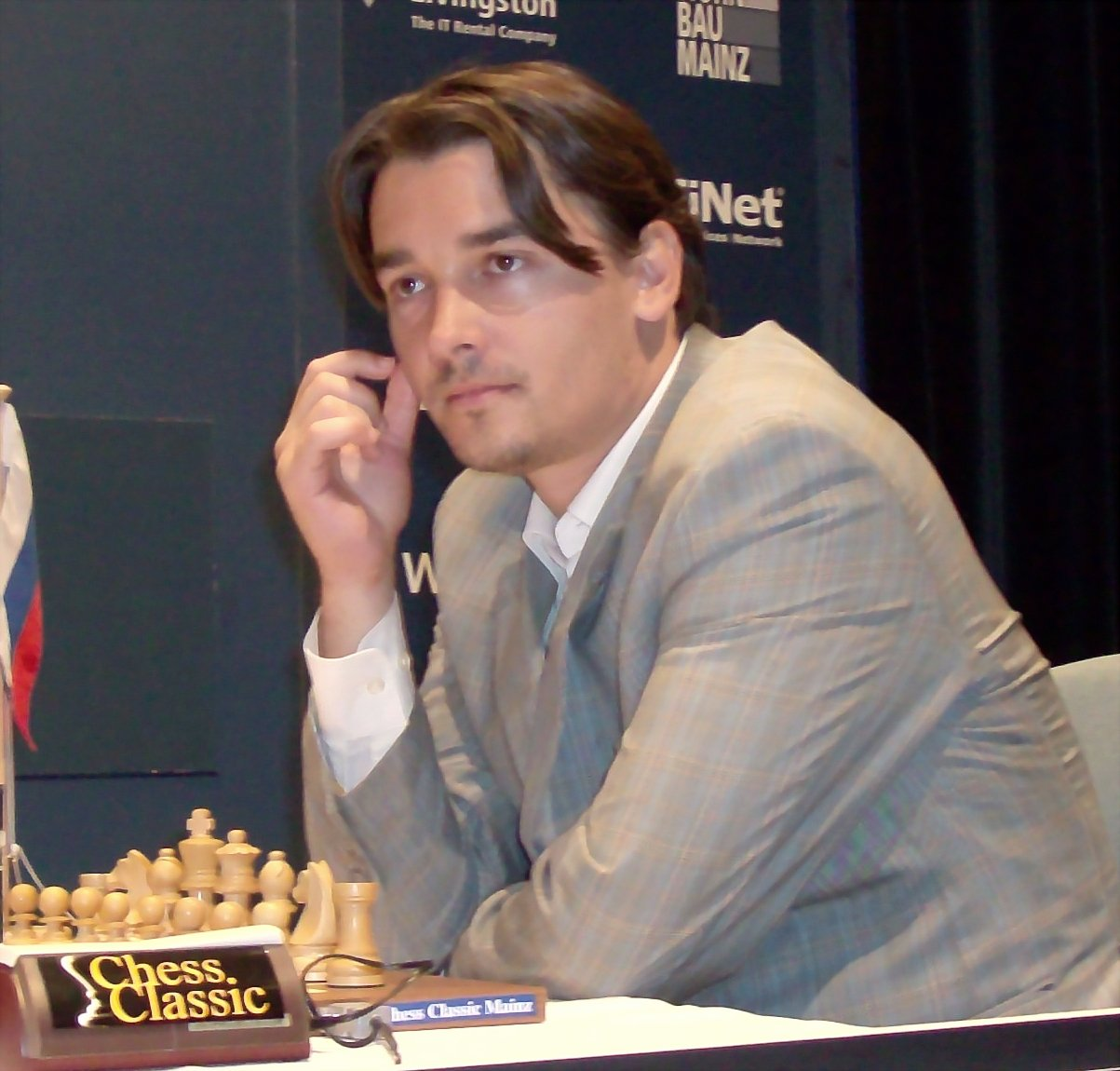
- Morozevich in 2008

Personal information
- Born: Alexander Sergeyevich Morozevich; July 18, 1977 (age 48) Moscow, Russian SFSR, Soviet Union

Chess career
- Country: Russia
- Title: Grandmaster (1994)
- FIDE rating: 2654 (July 2026)
- Peak rating: 2788 (July 2008)
- Ranking: No. 64 (July 2026)
- Peak ranking: No. 2 (July 2008)

Alexander Sergeyevich Morozevich (Russian: Александр Серге́евич Морозе́вич, romanized: Aleksandr Sergéevich Morozévich; born July 18, 1977) is a Russian chess player. He was awarded the title of Grandmaster by FIDE in 1994. Morozevich is a two-time World Championship candidate (2005, 2007), two-time Russian champion and has represented Russia in seven Chess Olympiads, winning numerous team and board medals.

He has won both the Melody Amber (alone 2002, shared 2004, 2006, 2008) and Biel (2003, 2004, 2006) tournaments several times.

Morozevich is known for his aggressive and unusual playing style. His peak ranking was second in the world in July 2008.

== Career ==
His first win in an international tournament was in 1994, when at the age of 17 he won the Lloyds Bank tournament in London with a score of 9½ points out of 10. In 1994 he also won the Pamplona tournament, a victory he repeated in 1998.

In 1997 Morozevich was the top seed at the World Junior Chess Championship, but lost to the eventual champion, American Tal Shaked, in a bishop and knight checkmate. That same year, Morozevich participated in the FIDE World Championship, where he eliminated former world champion Vassily Smyslov in the first round. He was knocked out in the second round by Lembit Oll. The next year Morozevich won the Russian Championship.

In 1999 he played in his first super-tournament in Sarajevo and finished in fourth scoring 5½ points of 9. In beginning of 2000 Morozevich participated at the Corus chess tournament in Wijk aan Zee and finished fifth out of 14 players. The event was won by Garry Kasparov ahead of Vladimir Kramnik, Viswanathan Anand and Peter Leko.

In the same year he participated in the FIDE World Championship played in New Delhi. Due to his rating he was seeded directly into the second round, in which he eliminated Gilberto Milos with the score of 2–0, then he proceeded to beat Evgeny Vladimirov 1½–½ in the third round before finally being eliminated in the fourth by Vladislav Tkachiev.

In Wijk aan Zee 2001 Morozevich became the first player to defeat World Champion Vladimir Kramnik after beating him with black. He shared fifth together with Alexei Shirov, behind Kasparov, Anand, Vassily Ivanchuk and Kramnik. In the 2001 FIDE World Championship, Morozevich beat Nugzar Zeliakov, Krishnan Sasikiran and Mikhail Gurevich before losing in tie-breaks in the fourth round against the eventual winner of the event Ruslan Ponomariov. In September 2005, Morozevich played in the FIDE World Chess Championship 2005 in San Luis, Argentina, taking fourth place behind Veselin Topalov, Anand and Peter Svidler.

In December 2006, he won the strong Pamplona tournament with a score of 6 points out of 7 and an Elo performance of 2951. He shared second place with Magnus Carlsen, behind Anand, at the 2007 Linares tournament.

His San Luis result earned him direct entry to the World Chess Championship 2007. In that tournament he scored 6 out of 14, placing sixth out of eight players. He was the only player who managed to defeat the reigning world champion Vladimir Kramnik (which was also Kramnik's only defeat in 2007).

In December 2007 Morozevich won the Russian Championship for the second time, winning the last six rounds. In June 2008 Morozevich won the Bosna tournament in Sarajevo with a margin of 1½ points ahead of second place. Two months later he shared second place in the Tal Memorial after leading the tournament in early rounds. While officially being fourth in the world, Morozevich unofficially climbed to the top spot of the world rating list, but fell back to fourth by the end of the tournament.

In June 2011 he won the Russian Championship Higher League in Taganrog with 8/11, earning a spot in the Superfinal, in which he came second behind the eventual winner Peter Svidler. In October Morozevich won the Saratov Governor's Cup in Russia with a score 8½/11, one and a half points ahead of the field, and a performance of 2917.

In February 2012 Morozevich came first in the Vladimir Petrov Memorial, a rapidplay tournament with the time control of 15 minutes plus 6 seconds per move. In 2014 he won the 15th Karpov International tournament in Poikovsky. Morozevich won the Magistral Ciutat de Barcelona tournament in 2015 on tiebreak over Axel Bachmann, having played more games with the black pieces.

=== Team competitions ===
Morozevich had great successes in team competitions: in the Chess Olympiad he won the gold medal with the Russian team three times (1998, 2000, 2002), one silver medal (2004) and a bronze medal (1994).

He also won the gold medal in the World Team Championships in 2005 in which he beat the member of the Chinese team in the last round in a must win situation. He also won two gold medals in the European Team Championships (2003 and 2007).

== Playing style ==
Morozevich is known to be an aggressive player with an unorthodox opening repertoire. He has on occasion played the Chigorin Defense (1.d4 d5 2.c4 Nc6) and the Albin Countergambit (1.d4 d5 2.c4 e5). He is also well known for preferring complicated positions. Due to his risky and spectacular style which produces relatively few draws, Morozevich is popular among chess fans.

In 2007, Morozevich published, along with co-author Vladimir Barsky, a book about the Chigorin Defense, called The Chigorin Defence According to Morozevich.

== Blindfold chess ==
Morozevich is considered to be one of the best blindfold chess players in the world. He has confirmed that status in blindfold sections of Melody Amber tournaments:

Year	Placement	Score
2002	First	9/11
2003	Shared second	7/11
2004	First	8½/11
2005	Shared second	6/11
2006	First	9½/11
2007	Shared second	7/11
2008	Shared first	6/11
2009	Shared fourth (with Anand)	6½/11

== Go ==
While in recent years, Morozevich has not been very active in chess competition, he has taken up Go. He has a Go ranking of 1 dan as of 2018. In July 2016, he beat Tiger Hillarp Persson in a 4-game mixed chess and go match.

Sporting positions
Preceded by Peter Svidler	Russian Chess Champion; 1998	Succeeded by Konstantin Sakaev
Preceded by Evgeny Alekseev	Russian Chess Champion; 2007	Succeeded by Peter Svidler
