= Encyclopaedia of Chess Openings =

Reference work on chess openings

First edition of ECO volume E. The title is given in eight languages. In the center are the two openings included in the volume: 1.d4 Nf6 2.c4 e6; and 1.d4 Nf6 2.c4 g6 without (symbol ┘) an early ...d7–d5.

The Encyclopaedia of Chess Openings (ECO) is a reference work describing the state of opening theory in chess, originally published in five volumes from 1974 to 1979 by the Serbian company Šahovski Informator ('Chess Informant'). It is currently undergoing its fifth edition.

The moves are taken from thousands of master games and from published analysis in Informant and compiled by the editors, most of whom are grandmasters, who select the lines that they consider most relevant or critical. The chief editor since the first edition has been Aleksandar Matanović (1930–2023). The openings are provided in an ECO table that concisely presents the opening lines considered most critical by the editors. ECO covers the openings in more detail than rival single-volume publications such as Modern Chess Openings and Nunn's Chess Openings, but in less detail than specialized opening books.

The books are intended for an international audience and contain only a small amount of text, which is in several languages. The bulk of the content consists of diagrams of positions and of annotated chess moves presented in Figurine Algebraic Notation.

Instead of the traditional names for the openings, ECO has developed a coding system that has also been adopted by other chess publications and chess websites. There are five main categories, "A" to "E", corresponding to the five volumes of the earlier editions, each of which is further subdivided into 100 subcategories, for a total of 500 codes. The term ECO is often used as a shorthand for this coding system. ECO code is a registered trademark of Chess Informant.

== Openings covered ==
=== Volume A: Flank openings ===
- English Opening
- Benoni Defence
- Dutch Defence
- Réti Opening
- Benko Gambit
- Old Indian Defence
- Bird's Opening
- Anti-Indian systems (Trompowsky Attack, Torre Attack, Richter–Veresov Attack)
- Irregular openings, etc.

=== Volume B: Semi-Open Games other than French Defence ===
- Sicilian Defence
- Caro-Kann Defence
- Pirc Defence
- Alekhine's Defence
- Modern Defence
- Scandinavian Defence, etc.

=== Volume C: Open Games and French Defence ===
- Ruy Lopez
- French Defence
- Petrov's Defence
- Vienna Game
- Centre Game
- King's Gambit
- Philidor Defence
- Italian (Giuoco Piano, Evans Gambit, Hungarian Defence, and Two Knights)
- Scotch Game
- Four Knights Game, etc.
- King's Pawn Opening, etc. (covers unusual/rare 1. e4 openings such as the Elephant Gambit and Ponziani Opening).

=== Volume D: Closed Games and Semi-Closed Games ===
(including Grünfeld Defence but not other Indian Defences)

- Queen's Gambit
  - Accepted
  - Declined (Slav, Orthodox, Tarrasch, Tartakower, Albin Countergambit, etc.)
- Grünfeld Defence
- Queen's Pawn Game, etc.

=== Volume E: Indian Defences ===
(other than Grünfeld Defence and Old Indian Defence)

- Nimzo-Indian Defence
- Queen's Indian Defence
- King's Indian Defence
- Catalan Opening
- Bogo-Indian Defence, etc.

== First edition ==
The first edition was published in the following years:

- Volume A: 1979
- Volume B: 1975
- Volume C: 1974
- Volume D: 1976
- Volume E: 1978

1st Edition Contributions
Author	Codes				
Author	A	B	C	D	E
Lev Abramov (USSR)				70–79, 98–99	27–29, 47–49
Yuri Averbakh (USSR)					00–05
Vladimir Bagirov (USSR)	25–29			00–01, 94–95	32–37
Gedeon Barcza (HUN)				60–65	
Isaac Boleslavsky (USSR)					67–69
Mikhail Botvinnik (USSR)	86–89, 92–95	13–14		70–79, 98–99	27–29, 47–49
Enver Bukić (YUG)				56–57	
Robert Byrne (USA)	82–83				97–99
Victor Ciocâltea (ROM)	43–44				
Srđan Cvetković (YUG)	40–42			02–05	06–07, 93–94
Max Euwe (NED)	06	28–29		31–32	90–92
Miroslav Filip (CSK)	10–15	10, 12, 15, 17, 36–39		50–55	46, 56–59
Tibor Flórián (HUN)				60–65	87–89
Efim Geller (USSR)	68, 77–79	20–26, 70–79, 80–81, 97–98			
Florin Gheorghiu (ROM)				45–46	
Aivars Gipslis (USSR)	30–34	92, 99		38–39, 80, 90–91	10–11, 20–23
Eduard Gufeld (USSR)	53–55, 65–66				
Vlastimil Hort (CSK)	45, 48–49	02–03		58–59	95–96
Borislav Ivkov (YUG)	80–81, 84–85				54–55
Anatoly Karpov (USSR)	62–64			85–89	83–84
Raymond Keene (ENG)	73–76				
Paul Keres (USSR)		04–05			
Viktor Korchnoi (FIDE)		30–31, 34–35		43–44, 47–49	
Alexander Kotov (USSR)	67, 96–99			15–19	43, 50–51
Zdenko Krnić (YUG)	40–42			25	06–07, 93–94
Bent Larsen (DEN)	00–01	00–01, 16		33–34	85–86
Vladimir Lepeshkin (USSR)					67–69
Andor Lilienthal (USSR)					87–89
Aleksandar Matanović (YUG)	16–19	62–69		30, 35–36	08–09, 15–19
Milan Matulović (YUG)				25	
Edmar Mednis (USA)	82–83				97–99
Nikolay Minev (BUL)	50–52, 56			06–09, 37–38	70–72, 76–79
Yakov Neishtadt (USSR)					00–05
Albéric O'Kelly de Galway (BEL)	02				
Bruno Parma (YUG)	03, 46–47	07–09		40–42	24–26, 53
Tigran Petrosian (USSR)	69–70, 90–91				
Lev Polugaevsky (USSR)	20–24	44, 50–53, 60–61, 86, 90–91, 93–96		26–29	14, 73–75
Yuri Razuvayev (USSR)	62–64				80–82, 83–84
Oleg Romanishin (USSR)	04-05				
Sergiu Samarian (FIDE)				45–46	
Vasily Smyslov (USSR)				96–97	
Vladimir Sokolov (YUG)	80–81, 84–85			02–05	
Alexey Suetin (USSR)	07, 09	27, 54–56, 58–59, 87		10–14	12–13
Mikhail Tal (USSR)		82–85			
Mark Taimanov (USSR)	34–39	40–43, 45–49		20–24	30–31, 40–45
Petar Trifunović (USSR)		06, 11, 18–19			
Vladimir Tukmakov (USSR)	57–59				
Dragan Ugrinović (YUG)	16–19	62–69		30, 35–36	08–09, 15–19
Wolfgang Uhlmann (DDR)	08, 60–61, 71	32–33		81–84, 92–93	60–63
Wolfgang Unzicker (DEU)					38–39
Dragoljub Velimirović (YUG)		57, 88–89			
Robert Wade (ENG)	72				64–66
Mikhail Yudovich (USSR)	00			66–69	52

== Second edition ==
The second edition was published in the following years:

- Volume A: 1996
- Volume B: 1984
- Volume C: 1981
- Volume D: 1987
- Volume E: 1991

Volume B (1984)
Author	Codes
Lev Abramov (USSR)	13–14
Vladimir Bagirov (USSR)	04–05, 18–19
Mikhail Botvinnik (USSR)	13–14
Srđan Cvetković (YUG)	28–29
Miroslav Filip (CSK)	10, 12, 15, 17, 36–39
Efim Geller (USSR)	70–79
Aivars Gipslis (USSR)	95–99
Eduard Gufeld (USSR)	20–21, 23–26
Vlastimil Hort (CSK)	02–03
Garry Kasparov (USSR)	80–85
Viktor Korchnoi (SUI)	30–31, 34–35
Zdenko Krnić (YUG)	28–29, 87
Bent Larsen (DEN)	00–01, 16
Aleksandar Matanović (YUG)	60–69
Nikolay Minev (BUL)	06, 11
John Nunn (ENG)	57, 88–89
Bruno Parma (YUG)	07–09
Lev Polugaevsky (USSR)	44, 50–53, 86, 90–94, 96
Alexey Suetin (USSR)	27, 54–56, 58–59
Evgeny Sveshnikov (USSR)	22, 33
Mark Taimanov (USSR)	40–43, 45–49
Dragan Ugrinović (YUG)	60–69
Wolfgang Uhlmann (DDR)	32

== Third edition ==
The third edition was published in the following years:

- Volume A: 1999
- Volume B: 1997
- Volume C: 1997
- Volume D: 1998
- Volume E: 1998

== Fourth edition ==
The fourth edition was published in the following years:

- Volume A: 2001
- Volume B: 2002
- Volume C: 2000
- Volume D: 2004
- Volume E: 2008

== Fifth edition ==
The fifth edition was published in the following years:

- Volume C: 2006
- Volume B part 1 [ECO codes: B00–B49]: 2020
- Volume B part 2 [ECO codes: B50-B99]: 2021

== See also ==
- List of ECO codes
- Chess annotation symbols – ECO uses symbols instead of text
- Chess Informant
- List of chess books
- Modern Chess Openings
- Opening book
