= Chigorin Defense =

Position: a8 black rook, c8 black bishop, d8 black queen, e8 black king, f8 black bishop, g8 black knight, h8 black rook, a7 black pawn, b7 black pawn, c7 black pawn, e7 black pawn, f7 black pawn, g7 black pawn, h7 black pawn, c6 black knight, d5 black pawn, c4 white pawn, d4 white pawn, a2 white pawn, b2 white pawn, e2 white pawn, f2 white pawn, g2 white pawn, h2 white pawn, a1 white rook, b1 white knight, c1 white bishop, d1 white queen, e1 white king, f1 white bishop, g1 white knight, h1 white rook
- Moves: 1.d4 d5 2.c4 Nc6
- ECO: D07
- Named after: Mikhail Chigorin
- Parent: Queen's Gambit

The Chigorin Defense is a chess opening named for 19th-century Russian master Mikhail Chigorin. An uncommonly played defense to the Queen's Gambit, it begins with the following moves:

1. d4 d5
2. c4 Nc6

The Chigorin Defense violates several classical principles: Black does not maintain the center pawn at d5, the c-pawn is blocked, and Black must be willing to trade a bishop for a knight. In return, Black gets quick development and piece pressure on the center.

Although opening assessments change as improvements are found for each side, the Chigorin is generally considered playable for Black, and it is useful as a surprise weapon against the Queen's Gambit. Alexander Morozevich is perhaps the only modern grandmaster who regularly plays the Chigorin Defense; in the 1980s, Vasily Smyslov did employ the opening against Garry Kasparov, achieving a draw. Morozevich has also published a book on the Chigorin Defense, in which he gives both a theoretical and a personal view on the opening.

The Chigorin Defense has the classification D07 in the Encyclopedia of Chess Openings.

== Main variations ==
Because the Chigorin is an unusual defense, the theory of this opening is not as well developed as that for more popular openings. After 1.d4 d5 2.c4 Nc6, some of the most commonly played variations are:

=== 3.Nc3 ===
- 3...Nf6 4.cxd5 Nxd5 5.e4 Nxc3 6.bxc3 e5 7.d5 Nb8 or 7.Nf3 exd4.
- 3...dxc4 4.Nf3 Nf6 5.e4 Bg4 6.Be3 e6 7.Bxc4 Bb4 (pinning both of White's knights) is a position that occurs very frequently in current practice.

=== 3.Nf3 ===
Position: a8 black rook, d8 black queen, e8 black king, f8 black bishop, g8 black knight, h8 black rook, a7 black pawn, b7 black pawn, c7 black pawn, e7 black pawn, f7 black pawn, g7 black pawn, h7 black pawn, c6 black knight, d5 white pawn, d4 white pawn, f3 black bishop, a2 white pawn, b2 white pawn, e2 white pawn, f2 white pawn, g2 white pawn, h2 white pawn, a1 white rook, b1 white knight, c1 white bishop, d1 white queen, e1 white king, f1 white bishop, h1 white rook

Position after 3.Nf3 Bg4 4.cxd5 Bxf3

Position: a8 black rook, c8 black bishop, e8 black king, g8 black knight, h8 black rook, a7 black pawn, b7 black pawn, c7 black pawn, f7 black pawn, g7 black pawn, h7 black pawn, c6 black knight, d5 black queen, e5 black pawn, d4 white pawn, c3 black bishop, e3 white pawn, a2 white pawn, b2 white pawn, d2 white bishop, f2 white pawn, g2 white pawn, h2 white pawn, a1 white rook, d1 white queen, e1 white king, f1 white bishop, g1 white knight, h1 white rook

Position after 3.cxd5 Qxd5 4.e3 e5 5.Nc3 Bb4 6.Bd2 Bxc3

- 3...Bg4 4.cxd5 Bxf3 (first diagram)
  - 5.gxf3 Qxd5 6.e3 and now Black has two very different, but proven ways of playing: 6...e5 7.Nc3 Bb4 and 6...e6 7.Nc3 Qh5.
  - 5.dxc6 Bxc6 6.Nc3 and Black has now two well-established options: 6...Nf6 and 6...e6.
- 3...e6 is fine.

=== 3.cxd5 Qxd5 ===
- 4.e3 e5 5.Nc3 Bb4 6.Bd2 Bxc3 (second diagram)
  - 7.bxc3 and now Black's main moves are 7...Nf6 and 7...Qd6.
  - 7.Bxc3 has received considerable attention in recent years, and 7...exd4 8.Ne2 Nf6 9.Nxd4 0-0 seems to be considered Black's most reliable choice, but the sharper 8...Bg4 is also sometimes played.
- 4.Nf3
