= Albin Countergambit =

Position: a8 black rook, b8 black knight, c8 black bishop, d8 black queen, e8 black king, f8 black bishop, g8 black knight, h8 black rook, a7 black pawn, b7 black pawn, c7 black pawn, f7 black pawn, g7 black pawn, h7 black pawn, d5 black pawn, e5 black pawn, c4 white pawn, d4 white pawn, a2 white pawn, b2 white pawn, e2 white pawn, f2 white pawn, g2 white pawn, h2 white pawn, a1 white rook, b1 white knight, c1 white bishop, d1 white queen, e1 white king, f1 white bishop, g1 white knight, h1 white rook
- Moves: 1.d4 d5 2.c4 e5
- ECO: D08–D09
- Origin: Salvioli vs. Cavallotti, Milan 1881
- Named after: Adolf Albin
- Parent: Queen's Gambit

The Albin Countergambit is a chess opening that begins with the moves:

1. d4 d5
2. c4 e5

and the usual continuation is:

3. dxe5 d4

The opening is a gambit and an uncommon response to the Queen's Gambit. In exchange for the sacrificed pawn, Black has a central wedge at d4 and gets some chances for an attack. Often White will try to return the pawn at an opportune moment to gain a positional advantage.

In the Encyclopaedia of Chess Openings the Albin Countergambit is assigned codes D08 and D09.

== History ==
Although this opening was originally played by Cavallotti against Salvioli at the Milan tournament of 1881, it takes its name from Adolf Albin, who played it against Emanuel Lasker in New York 1893. Though it is infrequently played at the master level, Russian grandmaster Alexander Morozevich made some successful use of it in the 2000s.

== Main line ==
Position: a8 black rook, c8 black bishop, d8 black queen, e8 black king, f8 black bishop, g8 black knight, h8 black rook, a7 black pawn, b7 black pawn, c7 black pawn, f7 black pawn, g7 black pawn, h7 black pawn, c6 black knight, e5 white pawn, c4 white pawn, d4 black pawn, f3 white knight, a2 white pawn, b2 white pawn, e2 white pawn, f2 white pawn, g2 white pawn, h2 white pawn, a1 white rook, b1 white knight, c1 white bishop, d1 white queen, e1 white king, f1 white bishop, h1 white rook

Main line: 3.dxe5 d4 4.Nf3 Nc6

The main line continues 4.Nf3 Nc6 (4...c5 allows 5.e3 because Black no longer has the bishop check) and now White's primary options are 5.a3, 5.Nbd2, and 5.g3. Perhaps White's surest try for an advantage is to fianchetto their light-squared bishop with 5.g3 followed by Bg2 and Nbd2. Black will often castle queenside. A typical continuation is 5.g3 Be6 6.Nbd2 Qd7 7.Bg2 0-0-0 8.0-0 Bh3.

== Variations ==
=== Lasker Trap ===
The black pawn on d4 is stronger than it may appear. After 3.dxe5 d4 the careless move 4.e3? can lead to the Lasker Trap. After 4...Bb4+ 5.Bd2 dxe3!! (sacrificing the bishop) 6.Bxb4?? is a blunder—Black continues with 6...exf2+! 7.Ke2 (7.Kxf2 does not work because of 7...Qxd1) 7...fxg1=N+! 8.Rxg1 Bg4+! and Black wins the queen with a winning position. The Lasker Trap is notable because it features a rare instance of an underpromotion in practical play.

=== Spassky Variation ===
In the Spassky Variation, White avoids the Lasker Trap by advancing 4.e4. Although Black can capture en passant with 4...dxe3, the Lasker Trap depends on Black capturing the e-pawn after 4...Bb4+ 5.Bd2, which is not possible here. According to Minev, after 4.e4? Nc6! Black will have the better game.

== See also ==
- List of chess openings
- List of chess openings named after people
