= Queen's Gambit Accepted =

Chess opening

Position: a8 black rook, b8 black knight, c8 black bishop, d8 black queen, e8 black king, f8 black bishop, g8 black knight, h8 black rook, a7 black pawn, b7 black pawn, c7 black pawn, e7 black pawn, f7 black pawn, g7 black pawn, h7 black pawn, c4 black pawn, d4 white pawn, a2 white pawn, b2 white pawn, e2 white pawn, f2 white pawn, g2 white pawn, h2 white pawn, a1 white rook, b1 white knight, c1 white bishop, d1 white queen, e1 white king, f1 white bishop, g1 white knight, h1 white rook
- Moves: 1.d4 d5 2.c4 dxc4
- ECO: D20–D29
- Parent: Queen's Gambit
- Synonym: QGA

The Queen's Gambit Accepted (QGA) is a chess opening beginning with the moves:

1. d4 d5
2. c4 dxc4

The Queen's Gambit Accepted is the third most popular option on Black's second move, after 2...e6 (the Queen's Gambit Declined) and 2...c6 (the Slav Defense). As Black's 2...dxc4 surrenders the centre, White will try to seize space in the centre and use it to launch an attack on Black's position. Black's game is not devoid of counterchances, however. If White's centre pawns can be held at bay, Black will try to weaken them to gain an advantage in the ensuing endgame by playing ...c5 and ...cxd4 at some stage. If White responds with exd4, the result will be an isolated pawn on d4 – which can also lead to a keen middlegame battle. If White recaptures with a piece at d4 instead, the centre will be liquidated and a fairly even game will usually ensue.

The Queen's Gambit is not considered a true gambit, in contrast to the King's Gambit, because the pawn is either regained, or can only be held unprofitably by Black. Black usually allows the pawn to be recaptured and uses the time expended to play against White's centre.

The Encyclopaedia of Chess Openings (ECO) classifies the Queen's Gambit Accepted under codes D20 to D29.

== History ==
While the Queen's Gambit Accepted was mentioned in literature as early as the 15th century, it was the World Chess Championship 1886 between Wilhelm Steinitz and Johannes Zukertort which introduced the first modern ideas in this opening. Black's play had, until then, centred on holding on to the c4-pawn. Steinitz's plan was to return the pawn, but inflict White with an isolated pawn on d4, then play to exploit the weakness.

Even with the modern treatment, the opening suffered from a slightly dubious reputation in the early 20th century. Alexander Alekhine introduced further ideas for Black and it was played at the highest levels beginning in the 1930s. The Queen's Gambit Accepted became less popular after World War II as the Indian Defenses were heavily played. At the end of the 1990s, a number of players among the world elite included the Queen's Gambit Accepted in their repertoires, and the line is currently considered sound.

== Main line: 3.Nf3 ==
After 1.d4 d5 2.c4 dxc4, the most popular move is 3.Nf3, which is where the main lines of the Queen's Gambit Accepted begin. Black's most common response is 3...Nf6, though 3...a6, the Alekhine Variation, is a common sideline.

3.Nf3 prevents Black from striking at the centre with ...e5, a common third move for Black after 3.e4 and 3.e3. White delays measures to regain the pawn for the moment; the recovery of the pawn will usually be done through 4.e3 and 5.Bxc4.

=== Classical Variation: 3...Nf6 4.e3 e6 5.Bxc4 c5 6.0-0 a6 ===
Position: a8 black rook, b8 black knight, c8 black bishop, d8 black queen, e8 black king, f8 black bishop, h8 black rook, b7 black pawn, f7 black pawn, g7 black pawn, h7 black pawn, a6 black pawn, e6 black pawn, f6 black knight, c5 black pawn, c4 white bishop, d4 white pawn, e3 white pawn, f3 white knight, a2 white pawn, b2 white pawn, f2 white pawn, g2 white pawn, h2 white pawn, a1 white rook, b1 white knight, c1 white bishop, d1 white queen, f1 white rook, g1 white king

Main line after 3.Nf3 Nf6 4.e3 e6 5.Bxc4 c5 6.0-0 a6

This is the traditional continuation after 3.Nf3, reached in thousands of games. Black has played to challenge the d4-pawn, and prepared for ...b5, which wins time by harassing the bishop on c4. In the meantime, White has safeguarded the king and regained the pawn. At this point, there are several options available for White, who needs to consider whether or not to deal with the positional threat of ...b5.

==== Old main line: 7.Qe2 ====
Theory holds that Black can equalise against the old main line, 7.Qe2, which allows 7...b5 (the most common move), though Black also has the seventh-move alternatives 7...Nc6 (preferred by Salo Flohr) and 7...cxd4. After 7...b5, White must retreat the bishop by playing either 8.Bb3 or 8.Bd3. After 8.Bb3, Black usually plays 8...Bb7, with the typical continuations 9.Rd1 Nbd7 10.Nc3 and 9.a4 b4 (or 9...Nbd7). After 8.Bd3, Black's most common reply is 8...cxd4.

After 7.Qe2 b5 8.Bb3 Bb7 9.Rd1 Nbd7 10.Nc3, 10...Bd6 is the Smyslov Variation, with White typically replying with 11.e4, though more common are the queen moves 10...Qb8, 10...Qb6, and 10...Qc7. White most often responds with 11.d5 to all of these.

==== Retreat line: 7.Bb3 ====
A modern line is the retreat 7.Bb3, so that 7...b5 can be met with 8.a4, while 7.a4, stopping ...b5 at the cost of weakening the b4-square, is also popular, and was played by Mikhail Botvinnik in his 1963 match with Tigran Petrosian. This line became quite frequently played in the early 21st century, but its popularity has declined since then.

==== Exchange line: 7.dxc5 ====
7.dxc5 leads to an early queen exchange, and often to an early draw. Black can initiate the trade with 7...Qxd1, with the typical continuation 8.Rxd1 Bxc5. 9.Be2 (or 9.Nbd2 and then 10.Be2) commonly follows. Alternatively, Black may recapture the pawn immediately with 7...Bxc5, allowing 8.Qxd8+ Kxd8. This prevents the quick development of White's rook seen in the other line at the cost of losing castling rights.

==== Other lines ====
Other lines which have a notable level of play are 7.e4 (Geller), 7.Nc3, 7.Nbd2, 7.a4, 7.b3, and 7.Bd3. 7.b3 has become more popular recently.

=== Late deviations from the classical line ===
==== Steinitz Variation: 6.0-0 cxd4 ====
6...cxd4 brings about an isolated queen's pawn structure. It has been called the Steinitz Variation, after Wilhelm Steinitz; the line became well known after his match with Zukertort in 1886, but theory has generally held White's activity in high regard. The early clarification of the central tension gives White too free a hand and the line is rarely seen in modern practice.

==== Furman Variation: 6.Qe2 ====
A major alternative to castling is 6.Qe2, called the Furman Variation after Semyon Furman. The idea behind 6.Qe2 is to support the advance of the e-pawn.

=== Janowski–Larsen Variation: 4.e3 Bg4 ===
An alternative line for Black is 4...Bg4, the Janowski–Larsen Variation. The main line continues 5.Bxc4 e6, usually leading to a solid position, though the game can become sharp if White immediately attempts to exploit the weakness of Black's queenside in the line 6.Qb3 Bxf3 7.gxf3 Nd7 as Black gains great piece activity and spoils White's kingside pawns in return for sacrificing a pawn.

=== Mannheim Variation: 4.Qa4+ ===
Position: a8 black rook, c8 black bishop, d8 black queen, e8 black king, f8 black bishop, h8 black rook, a7 black pawn, b7 black pawn, c7 black pawn, e7 black pawn, f7 black pawn, g7 black pawn, h7 black pawn, c6 black knight, f6 black knight, a4 white queen, c4 black pawn, d4 white pawn, f3 white knight, a2 white pawn, b2 white pawn, e2 white pawn, f2 white pawn, g2 white pawn, h2 white pawn, a1 white rook, b1 white knight, c1 white bishop, e1 white king, f1 white bishop, h1 white rook

Mannheim Variation: 3.Nf3 Nf6 4.Qa4+ Nc6

4.Qa4+ leads to the Mannheim Variation, so named after its adoption in one of the cities where the World Chess Championship 1934 was played, even though the move was previously known. Black usually gains easy equality after 4...Nc6, so the line is fairly rare. Grandmasters Michał Krasenkow and Ulf Andersson have played the line several times.

=== Two Knights Variation: 4.Nc3 ===
4.Nc3 leads to the Two Knights Variation, which is a true gambit line since White can no longer expect to regain the c4-pawn after 4...a6 5.e4 b5. White's compensation in the form of a strong centre leads to immensely complicated play. Black does not need to enter this line, and 4...Nc6, 4...e6, and 4...c6 tend to transpose to the Chigorin Defense, QGD Vienna Variation, and Slav Defense respectively.

=== Alekhine Variation: 3...a6 ===
3...a6 is the Alekhine Variation. White usually continues 4.e3. 4...Nf6 tends to return to the main line. This is an uncommon line that mainly focuses on rapid development of pieces along with domination of the centre. This variation was debuted by Alexander Alekhine against Efim Bogoljubov in 1929.

=== Other lines ===
- 3...c5 is the Gunsberg Variation. Common replies include 4.e3, 4.d5, and 4.e4.
- 3...e6 is the Rosenthal Variation. It is also frequently reached via the move order 1.d4 d5 2.c4 e6 3.Nf3 dxc4. Black typically replies with 4.e3.
- 3...c6 is a line more often than not reached by transposition from the Slav Defense after 1.d4 d5 2.c4 c6 3.Nf3 dxc4. The move ...c6 supports a potential ...b5.
- 3...b5 is possible, but not seen as often as against 3.e4. It often transposes to the 3...c6 line after 4.a4 c6.

== Central Variation: 3.e4 ==
White can try to establish a strong pawn centre with 3.e4, an old move that became popular again in the 1990s. Rizzitano calls it the Central Variation and notes its increase in popularity and strategic and tactical complexity. Raetsky and Chetverik consider the line straightforward and critical, and remark that anyone playing the Queen's Gambit Accepted must be prepared to meet it.

=== 3...e5 ===
Position: a8 black rook, b8 black knight, c8 black bishop, d8 black queen, e8 black king, f8 black bishop, g8 black knight, h8 black rook, a7 black pawn, b7 black pawn, c7 black pawn, f7 black pawn, g7 black pawn, h7 black pawn, e5 black pawn, c4 black pawn, d4 white pawn, e4 white pawn, f3 white knight, a2 white pawn, b2 white pawn, f2 white pawn, g2 white pawn, h2 white pawn, a1 white rook, b1 white knight, c1 white bishop, d1 white queen, e1 white king, f1 white bishop, h1 white rook

3.e4 e5 4.Nf3

The main reply against the Central Variation is to oppose the pawn centre with 3...e5, which is a highly theoretical system. White's best reply is 4.Nf3 (4.d5?! is a common mistake), where play most often continues 4...exd4 5.Bxc4 Nc6 (5...Bb4+ is also seen) 6.0-0 Be6.

Black also has the option of 4...Bb4+. Common continuations include 5.Nc3 Nf6 6.Nxe5 b5, 5.Nc3 exd4, and 5.Bd2 Bxd2+.

=== 3...b5 ===
Position: a8 white knight, c8 black bishop, d8 black king, f8 black bishop, h8 black rook, a7 black pawn, b7 black queen, d7 black knight, f7 black pawn, g7 black pawn, h7 black pawn, f6 black knight, b5 black pawn, c4 black pawn, d4 white pawn, e4 white pawn, f4 white bishop, b2 white pawn, f2 white pawn, g2 white pawn, h2 white pawn, a1 white rook, d1 white queen, e1 white king, f1 white bishop, g1 white knight, h1 white rook

Exchange sacrifice line after 3.e4 b5 4.a4 c6 5.axb5 cxb5 6.Nc3 Qb6 7.Nd5 Qb7 8.Bf4 e5 9.Bxe5 Nd7 10.Bf4 Ngf6 11.Nc7+ Kd8 12.Nxa8

Trying to protect the pawn with 3...b5 is fairly risky and rarely seen, though it still has advocates, and its popularity rose in the 2020s after the discovery of 6...Qb6, though 3...e5 remains more popular. The usual continuation is 4.a4 c6 5.axb5 cxb5 6.Nc3; 6.b3 (Greco's move) and 5.Nc3 are also seen. After 6.Nc3, Black has a major choice. The modern 6...Qb6 and 6...a6, alongside the traditional 6...Bd7, are the main moves.

After 6...Qb6, White's common moves are 7.b3, 7.Nd5, and 7.Be3. 7.Nd5 tends to lead to an exchange sacrifice after 7...Qb7 8.Bf4 e5 9.Bxe5 Nd7 10.Bf4 Ngf6 11.Nc7+ Kd8 12.Nxa8 Qxe4+ 13.Ne2 Qxa8. 6...a6 also tends to lead to an exchange sacrifice; the usual continuation is 7.Nxb5 axb5 8.Rxa8 Bb7 9.Ra1 (or 9.Ra2) e6.

=== Other lines ===
- 3...Nc6 is a modern line aimed at challenging the centre with ideas akin to the Chigorin Defense. The most common reply is 4.Nf3, with the alternatives 4.d5 and 4.Be3. 4.Nf3 has the typical continuations 4...Bg4 5.d5 Ne5 and 4...Nf6 5.Nc3 Bg4 6.Be3 e6 7.Bxc4 Bb4.
- 3...Nf6 is another modern line. It provokes 4.e5, typically continuing 4...Nd5 5.Bxc4 Nb6, a pattern also seen in Alekhine's Defense. 5...Bf5, 5...Nc6, and 5...e6?! are alternatives for Black.
- 3...c5 is the Rubinstein Variation. Black plays to undermine White's centre at d4.

== White's third-move alternatives ==
=== 3.e3 ===
Position: a8 black rook, b8 black knight, c8 black bishop, d8 black queen, e8 black king, f8 black bishop, g8 black knight, h8 black rook, a7 black pawn, e7 black pawn, f7 black pawn, g7 black pawn, h7 black pawn, b5 black pawn, c4 black pawn, d4 white pawn, e3 white pawn, f3 white queen, b2 white pawn, f2 white pawn, g2 white pawn, h2 white pawn, a1 white rook, b1 white knight, c1 white bishop, e1 white king, f1 white bishop, g1 white knight, h1 white rook

Rook trap known since 1604: 3.e3 b5? 4.a4 c6 5.axb5 cxb5?? 6.Qf3!

The apparently modest 3.e3 prepares immediate recovery of the pawn and has often been employed by strong players, including Anatoly Karpov. The line long had a harmless reputation due to the early discovery of 3...e5 which strikes back at the centre. A typical continuation is then 4.Bxc4 exd4 5.exd4, leading to an isolated queen's pawn position. However, the open positions which ensue have not proved easy for Black to handle in practice, and many players simply play 3...e6 to transpose back to the main lines. Nonetheless, 3...e5 was Rizzitano's recommendation in his repertoire against 3.e3.

An opening trap where Black tries clinging onto the c4-pawn was pointed out by Alessandro Salvio in 1604. If Black defends the pawn with 3...b5? 4.a4 c6 5.axb5 cxb5??, the a8–h1 diagonal is fatally weakened and 6.Qf3 Nc6 7. Qxc6 wins a minor piece. 3...Be6 holds on to the pawn, but White has good compensation after 4.Ne2.

=== 3.Nc3 ===
3.Nc3 was labelled "misguided" by Raetsky and Chetverik, because the development does not control d4 and e5, and the knight is vulnerable to a b-pawn advance from Black. 3...e5, 3...Nf6, and 3...a6 are all reasonable replies, and 3...Nc6 leads to a standard line in the Chigorin Defense. 3. Nc3 was recommended by Keene and Jacobs in their opening repertoire for White.

=== 3.Qa4+ ===
The queen check by 3.Qa4+ Nc6 4.Nf3 will quickly regain the pawn with Qxc4, but the early development of the queen allows Black to win time by harassing it, so this line is rarely played. More popular is to delay the check to the fourth move, as seen in the Mannheim Variation.
