= Tarrasch Defense =

Position: a8 black rook, b8 black knight, c8 black bishop, d8 black queen, e8 black king, f8 black bishop, g8 black knight, h8 black rook, a7 black pawn, b7 black pawn, f7 black pawn, g7 black pawn, h7 black pawn, e6 black pawn, c5 black pawn, d5 black pawn, c4 white pawn, d4 white pawn, c3 white knight, a2 white pawn, b2 white pawn, e2 white pawn, f2 white pawn, g2 white pawn, h2 white pawn, a1 white rook, c1 white bishop, d1 white queen, e1 white king, f1 white bishop, g1 white knight, h1 white rook
- Moves: 1.d4 d5 2.c4 e6 3.Nc3 c5
- ECO: D32–D34
- Named after: Siegbert Tarrasch
- Parent: Queen's Gambit Declined

The Tarrasch Defense is a chess opening characterized by the moves:

1. d4 d5
2. c4 e6
3. Nc3 c5

The Tarrasch is a variation of the Queen's Gambit Declined. Black's third move is an aggressive bid for central space. After White plays cxd5 and dxc5, Black will be left with an isolated pawn on d5. Such a pawn may be weak, since it can no longer be defended by other pawns, but it grants Black a foothold in the center, and Black's bishops will have unobstructed lines for development.

The opening was advocated by the German player Siegbert Tarrasch, who contended that the increased mobility Black enjoys is well worth the inherent weakness of the isolated center pawn. Although many other masters, after the teachings of Wilhelm Steinitz, rejected the Tarrasch Defense out of hand because of the pawn weakness, Tarrasch continued to play his opening while rejecting other variations of the Queen's Gambit, even to the point of putting question marks on routine moves in all variations except the Tarrasch (which he awarded an exclamation mark) in his book Die moderne Schachpartie. (See chess punctuation.)

The Tarrasch Defense is considered sound. Even if Black fails to make use of their mobility and winds up in an inferior endgame, tied to the defense of their isolated pawn, they may be able to hold the draw if they defend accurately.

In the Encyclopedia of Chess Openings, the Tarrasch Defense has codes D32 through D34.

== Main line: 4.cxd5 exd5 5.Nf3 Nc6 ==
Position: a8 black rook, c8 black bishop, d8 black queen, f8 black rook, g8 black king, a7 black pawn, b7 black pawn, e7 black bishop, f7 black pawn, g7 black pawn, h7 black pawn, c6 black knight, f6 black knight, c5 black pawn, d5 black pawn, d4 white pawn, c3 white knight, f3 white knight, g3 white pawn, a2 white pawn, b2 white pawn, e2 white pawn, f2 white pawn, g2 white bishop, h2 white pawn, a1 white rook, c1 white bishop, d1 white queen, f1 white rook, g1 white king

Main line after 4.cxd5 exd5 5.Nf3 Nc6 6.g3 Nf6 7.Bg2 Be7 8.0-0 0-0

In the main line, White isolates Black's queen pawn with 4.cxd5 exd5 and attempts to exploit its weakness. The most common move is then 5.Nf3, which allows Nxd4 in response to a potential ...cxd4. If White played 3.Nf3 instead of 3.Nc3, a move order that avoids the Hennig–Schara Gambit, 3...c5 4.cxd5 exd5 5.Nc3 transposes to the main line.

After the usual 5...Nc6 (5...Nf6 transposes to the Semi-Tarrasch Defense), the most common setup is to fianchetto the king's bishop with 6.g3 in order to put pressure on Black's isolated d-pawn, as 3...c5 relinquishes the possibility of protecting the square d5 by means of ...c6.

=== Traditional line: 6.g3 Nf6 7.Bg2 Be7 8.0-0 0-0 ===
After 4.cxd5 exd5 5.Nf3 Nc6 6.g3, the traditional main line continues 6...Nf6 7.Bg2 Be7 8.0-0 0-0. In modern praxis, 9.Bg5 is most frequently played here, though there are other ideas of note, 9.dxc5 and 9.b3 being the main alternatives. (Other lines are 9.Be3, 9.Bf4, and 9.a3.)

=== Dubov Variation: 7...cxd4 8.Nxd4 Bc5 ===
During the 2010s, the hitherto forgotten line 7...cxd4 8.Nxd4 Bc5 became a topic of theoretical debate at the top level mainly due to the efforts of Russian grandmaster Daniil Dubov. This approach to the Tarrasch Defense has been called Dubov's Tarrasch.

=== Swedish Variation: 6...c4 ===
Position: a8 black rook, c8 black bishop, d8 black queen, e8 black king, f8 black bishop, g8 black knight, h8 black rook, a7 black pawn, b7 black pawn, f7 black pawn, g7 black pawn, h7 black pawn, c6 black knight, d5 black pawn, c4 black pawn, d4 white pawn, c3 white knight, f3 white knight, g3 white pawn, a2 white pawn, b2 white pawn, e2 white pawn, f2 white pawn, h2 white pawn, a1 white rook, c1 white bishop, d1 white queen, e1 white king, f1 white bishop, h1 white rook

Swedish Variation: 6...c4

The Swedish Variation (ECO code D33), also called the Folkestone Variation, is a sharp line beginning 6...c4. Black now has a four to three queenside pawn majority, and will try to expand with ...b5, with White aiming for a central break with e4. The line is considered somewhat dubious and is rarely seen in modern practice.

=== 6.dxc5 ===
6.dxc5 is a notable alternative to 6.g3 that has grown in popularity over time, though it was once considered a unchallenging continuation. Black's main reply is 6...d4, Tarrasch's original idea. The main line of the variation then continues 7.Na4 Bxc5 8.Nxc5 Qa5+ 9.Bd2 Qxc5. 9.Qd2 is also possible.

After 9.Bd2 Qxc5, the main move is 10.Rc1.

=== White's sixth-move alternatives ===
6.e3 and 6.Bg5 are also seen, and were once more common than 6.dxc5.

=== White's fifth-move alternatives ===
- 5.dxc5 can be met with 5...d4, kicking White's knight. 6.Na4 (often continuing 6...b5) and 6.Ne4 are both common replies. It has been referred to as the Tarrasch Gambit.
- 5.e4 is a rare gambit that was tried by Frank Marshall.

== Hennig–Schara Gambit: 4.cxd5 cxd4 ==
After 4.cxd5, Black may offer the Hennig–Schara Gambit with 4...cxd4. While it was once tried by Alexander Alekhine and retains some play at the master level, it is considered advantageous for White.

== White's fourth-move alternatives ==
- 4.e3 is the most common alternative to 4.Nc3, often leading to a symmetrical position after 4...Nf6 5.Nf3 Nc6 (or 4...Nc6 5.Nf3 Nf6). It can also be reached from the Semi-Tarrasch Defense and is further analyzed on that page.
- 4.Nf3 can transpose to the main line after 4...Nc6, the Semi-Tarrasch after 4...Nf6, or lead to an independent line with 4...cxd4 5.Nxd4 e5.
- 4.dxc5 can be met with 4...d4, similarly to 5.dxc5 and 6.dxc5.

== See also ==
- List of chess openings
- List of chess openings named after people
- Semi-Tarrasch Defense
