= Slav Defense =

Chess opening

Position: a8 black rook, b8 black knight, c8 black bishop, d8 black queen, e8 black king, f8 black bishop, g8 black knight, h8 black rook, a7 black pawn, b7 black pawn, e7 black pawn, f7 black pawn, g7 black pawn, h7 black pawn, c6 black pawn, d5 black pawn, c4 white pawn, d4 white pawn, a2 white pawn, b2 white pawn, e2 white pawn, f2 white pawn, g2 white pawn, h2 white pawn, a1 white rook, b1 white knight, c1 white bishop, d1 white queen, e1 white king, f1 white bishop, g1 white knight, h1 white rook
- Moves: 1.d4 d5 2.c4 c6
- ECO: D10–D19
- Parent: Queen's Gambit

The Slav Defense is a chess opening that begins with the moves:

1. d4 d5
2. c4 c6

The Slav is one of the primary defenses to the Queen's Gambit. Although it was analyzed as early as 1590, it was not until the 1920s that it started to be explored extensively, although Steinitz played it in the 1886 World Championship. Many masters of Slavic descent helped develop the theory of the opening, including Semyon Alapin, Alexander Alekhine, Efim Bogoljubov, and Milan Vidmar.

The Slav received an exhaustive test during the two Alekhine–Euwe World Championship matches in 1935 and 1937. Played by 11 of the first 13 world champions, this defense was particularly favored by Max Euwe, Mikhail Botvinnik, and Vasily Smyslov. More recently, the Slav has been adopted by Viswanathan Anand, Vassily Ivanchuk, Joël Lautier, Nigel Short, and other top grandmasters, including use in six of the eight games that Vladimir Kramnik played as Black in the 2006 World Championship.

The theory of the Slav has become very extensive and well-developed. The Slav is often distinguished from the related Semi-Slav Defense by Black avoiding or delaying the move ...e6, which is instead played early on in the Semi-Slav, though transposition to the Semi-Slav from the Slav is common.

== General considerations ==
The Slav can be entered by many move orders. The possibilities include other lines with 1.d4 d5, such as 2.Nf3 Nf6 3.c4 c6; from the Indian Defence (1.d4 Nf6), such as via 2.c4 c6 3.Nc3 d5; from the Zukertort Opening (1.Nf3), such as via 1...d5 2.c4 c6 3.d4 Nf6; and others.

Black faces two major problems in the orthodox line (with 2...e6) of the Queen's Gambit Declined (QGD):

1. Development of the queen bishop is difficult, as it is often blocked by a black pawn on e6.
2. The pawn structure offers White targets, especially the possibility of a minority attack on the queenside in the Exchange Variation (2...e6 3.Nc3 Nf6 4.cxd5).

The Slav (besides the Semi-Slav) addresses these problems. Black's queen bishop is unblocked; the pawn structure remains balanced. Also, if Black later takes the gambit pawn with ...dxc4, the support provided by the pawn on c6 (and possibly ...a6) allows ...b5 which may threaten to keep the pawn, or drive away a white piece that has captured it, gaining Black a tempo for queenside expansion.

On the other hand, Black usually will not be able to develop the queen bishop without first giving up the center with ...dxc4, developing the bishop may leave Black's queenside weak, and the thematic break ...c5 incurs the loss of a tempo.

=== Variations ===
The main line of the Slav Defense continues with 3.Nf3 Nf6 4.Nc3. The main alternative to 3...Nf6 is 3...e6, which may lead to various possibilities, such as the Noteboom Variation, Semi-Slav Defense or Stonewall Dutch. 3...dxc4 is also possible, transposing to a line of the Queen's Gambit Accepted. 3...Bf5? is a mistake due to 4.cxd5 cxd5 5.Qb3, where Black must play 5...Bc8 to avoid losing the b-pawn.

After 4.Nc3, Black has several potential plans in the opening.

- 4...dxc4 is the "Pure" Slav (or main line Slav) where Black attempts to develop the light-squared bishop to f5 or g4. The usual continuation is 5.a4 Bf5, the Czech Variation, but there are several sidelines.
- 4...a6 is the Chebanenko Slav.
- 4...e6 is the Semi-Slav, where ...e6 is played without developing the light-squared bishop. The Semi-Slav Defense, a kind of a combination of the orthodox Queen's Gambit Declined and Slav Defense, is a very complex opening in its own right.
- 4...g6 is the Schlechter Slav, much rarer than the other three moves.

== Czech Variation: 3.Nf3 Nf6 4.Nc3 dxc4 5.a4 Bf5 ==
Position: a8 black rook, b8 black knight, d8 black queen, e8 black king, f8 black bishop, h8 black rook, a7 black pawn, b7 black pawn, e7 black pawn, f7 black pawn, g7 black pawn, h7 black pawn, c6 black pawn, f6 black knight, f5 black bishop, a4 white pawn, c4 black pawn, d4 white pawn, c3 white knight, f3 white knight, b2 white pawn, e2 white pawn, f2 white pawn, g2 white pawn, h2 white pawn, a1 white rook, c1 white bishop, d1 white queen, e1 white king, f1 white bishop, h1 white rook

Main line: 3.Nf3 Nf6 4.Nc3 dxc4 5.a4 Bf5

The Czech Variation can be considered the main line of the Slav. With 5.a4, White acts against ...b5 and prepares 6.e4 and 7.Bxc4. Black's main reply is 5...Bf5, which prevents 6.e4.

=== Dutch Variation: 6.e3 ===
If White plays 6.e3, the Dutch Variation, play can continue 6...e6 7.Bxc4 Bb4 8.0-0 0-0 with a fairly quiet game. Black can also play 6...Na6 with the idea of 7...Nb4, known as the Lasker Variation.

=== Krause Attack: 6.Ne5 ===
A more energetic line begins 6.Ne5 (Krause Attack) where White intends f2–f3 and e2–e4 or Nxc4, perhaps followed by a fianchetto of the king bishop with g2–g3 and Bg2. Black can try either 6...Nbd7 7.Nxc4 Qc7 8.g3 e5 (known as the Carlsbad Variation) or 7...Nb6 or 6...e6 7.f3 Bb4, when 8.e4 Bxe4 9.fxe4 Nxe4 is a complex piece sacrifice with the semi-forced continuation 10.Bd2 Qxd4 11.Nxe4 Qxe4+ 12.Qe2 Bxd2+ 13.Kxd2 Qd5+ 14.Kc2 Na6. White can also play 10.Qf3 and force a draw.

=== Other lines ===
- 6.Nh4 has been called the Bled Attack.

== Black's fifth-move alternatives ==
=== Steiner Variation: 5...Bg4 ===
In the Steiner Variation (also called the Bronstein Variation), 5...Bg4, White may be discouraged from e4 by the possibility 6.e4 e5. More often the game continues 6.Ne5 Bh5.

=== Smyslov Variation: 5...Na6 ===
With the Smyslov Variation, 5...Na6, Black allows the e-pawn to come to e4 but can gain counterplay by ...Bg4 and perhaps bringing the knight to b4 e.g. 6.e4 Bg4 7.Bxc4 e6 8.0-0 Nb4.

=== Other lines ===
- 5...e6 is the Soultanbéieff Variation.

== White's fifth-move alternatives ==
=== Geller Gambit: 5.e4 ===
White's sharpest try against 4...dxc4 is the Geller Gambit, 5.e4. Play usually continues 5...b5 6.e5 Nd5 7.a4 e6, but it is unclear whether the attack is strong enough for the sacrificed pawn. Evaluation of this line changes as improvements are found, but as of 2005 it is generally thought to favor Black.

=== Alekhine Variation: 5.e3 ===
5.e3 is a solid choice known as the Alekhine Variation. Play can proceed 5...b5 6.a4 b4 and then:

- 7.Na2 e6 8.Bxc4
- 7.Nb1 Ba6 8.Nbd2 c3 9.bxc3 Bxf1 10.Nxf1 bxc3

== Black's fourth-move alternatives ==
=== Chebanenko Variation: 4...a6 ===
The Chebanenko Slav occurs after 4...a6. Black seeks an early b5, either before or after capturing at c4. Traditionally, Black had a choice between 4...e6, the Semi-Slav, and 4...dxc4 before developing the queen bishop, but in the 1990s 4...a6 was introduced, with the idea of developing the queenside without locking in the queen bishop or conceding the center.

White can achieve an important space advantage with 5.c5. Both e5 and b6 become important pawn breaks for Black. White will often play their bishop to f4, controlling the important dark squares e5, d6, c7, and b8 (this last square reduces Black's control over the b-file should it open). The game can continue 5...Bf5 6.Bf4 Nbd7 7.e3 Nh5!.

=== Other lines ===
While 4...Bf5 is playable, it is not the best choice for Black, because White will gain the advantage with either 5.Qb3 or 5.cxd5 followed by 6.Qb3.

== White's fourth-move alternatives ==
=== 4.Qc2 or 4.Qb3 ===
A line that is similar to the Catalan Opening is 4.Qc2 or 4.Qb3. Often, White will fianchetto their light-square bishop. This has the disadvantage of White's queen being somewhat exposed on c2. Black can meet 4.Qc2 with 4...g6, intending 5...Bf5. White usually plays 5.Bf4 so that after 5...Bf5 6.Qb3 Qb6 White can play 7.c5! Black has to play 7...Qxb3, which will be met by 8.axb3. White has a moderate advantage in this queenless middlegame, as White can expand on the queenside and try to create play on the queenside, but Black's position is solid. The most common continuation is 4...dxc4 5.Qxc4, followed by 5...Bf5 or 5...Bg4.

=== Quiet Variation: 4.e3 ===
White can avoid the complexities of the main line with 4.Nc3 by playing 4.e3, which can also be referred to as the Slow Slav. The most common continuation is 4...Bf5 5.Nc3 e6 6.Nh4, when White wins the bishop pair but Black gets a solid position and often gets counterplay with ...e5. This line was tested several times in the 2006 World Chess Championship. Alternatively, 5.cxd5 cxd5 6.Qb3 Qc7 is fine for Black. White will try to take advantage of the absence of Black's queen bishop on the queenside, but this isn't enough to gain an advantage if Black plays accurately. Another way to play is 4...Bg4.

=== Other lines ===
- 4.g3 is another Catalan style approach.

== White's third-move alternatives ==
The main line is 3.Nf3, but White can also try 3.Nc3, 3.cxd5, and 3.e3.

=== 3.Nc3 ===
After 3.Nc3, the pressure on Black's center prevents 3...Bf5? since after 4.cxd5 cxd5 5.Qb3 White wins a pawn. Instead, 3...Nf6 is most common; 4.Nf3 then transposes to the main line, but White can also play 4.e3. After 4.e3, it was thought Black could no longer play the "Pure" Slav with 4...Bf5 due to 5.cxd5 cxd5 6.Qb3. Recently however, the sacrificial continuation 6...Nc6 7.Qxb7 Bd7 has revitalized 4...Bf5. Black can also play 4...e6, 4...a6, or 4...g6 instead of inviting the line with Qb3.

==== Winawer Countergambit: 3...e5 ====
Black can try the Winawer Countergambit, 3...e5, which was introduced by Szymon Winawer in a game against Frank Marshall (Monte Carlo 1901), but this is thought to be slightly better for White.

Play may continue in a pattern similar to the Albin Countergambit with 4.dxe5 d4, typically followed by 5.Ne4 Qa5+. Then two possible continuations are 6.Bd2 Qxe5 7.Ng3 and 6.Nd2 Nd7 7.Nf3 Nxe5 8.Nxd4 Nxc4.

==== 3...dxc4 ====
Because of the possibility of 4.e3, "Pure" Slav players sometimes meet 3.Nc3 with 3...dxc4, which has been called the Argentinian Defense, and can transpose to the main line of the "Pure" Slav. The line can also be viewed as transposing to Queen's Gambit Accepted. 3...dxc4 is significantly more common after 3.Nc3 than 3.Nf3, which may discourage White players from choosing 3.Nc3. It is seen as a good surprise weapon for Black.

The line continues with either 4.e4 or 4.e3 (4.a4 is also possible but well met by 4...e5). After either move, play tends to continue 4...b5 5.a4 b4. In the 4.e3 line, the knight may move to the center with 6.Ne4; in the 4.e4 line, the main option is the retreat 6.Na2.

=== Exchange Variation: 3.cxd5 cxd5 ===
The Exchange Variation was once described as "the system that takes the fun out of playing the Slav" for Black. After 3.cxd5 cxd5, the symmetrical position offers White only the advantage of the extra move, but the drawish position offers Black little chance to win unless White is overly ambitious. The rooks will often be exchanged down the now open c-file. This line is often used as a drawing weapon.

To avoid the possibility of White entering the Exchange Slav, Black often chooses the move order 2...e6 followed by 3...c6 to enter the Semi-Slav; this is known as the Triangle System. It may lead to a main line Semi-Slav Defense or to independent lines.

==== 4.Nc3 ====
A less drawish option for White is 4.Nc3. Black tends to respond with 4...Nf6, where White's main move is 5.Bf4 (5.Nf3 transposes to the 4.Nf3 line), with play tending to continue 5...Nc6 6.e3, and then 6...a6, 6...Bf5, or 6...Bg4, the latter two of which invite 7.Qb3.

4...Nc6 is also possible for Black. Black tends to respond with 4...Nf6, which may be followed by 5.Bf4 or 5.e4 (or 5.Nf3, also transposing to the 4.Nf3 line). White can avoid this line by playing 3.Nc3, and then only 4.cxd5 after Black plays 3...Nf6.

==== 4.Nf3 ====
If White wants a draw, 4.Nf3 is typically played. The usual continuation is 4...Nf6 5.Nc3 Nc6 6.Bf4 Bf5, resulting in a totally symmetrical position where every piece is developed to a good square.

=== 3.e3 ===
Black often plays 3...Nf6 but 3...Bf5 is considered to be an easier equalizer. Also, 3...Nf6 4.Nc3 (same as 3.Nc3 Nf6 4.e3 below) may give Black some move-order issues for those wanting to play the "Pure" Slav and not the Semi-Slav or ...a6 Slav.
