= Indian Defence =

Position: a8 black rook, b8 black knight, c8 black bishop, d8 black queen, e8 black king, f8 black bishop, h8 black rook, a7 black pawn, b7 black pawn, c7 black pawn, d7 black pawn, e7 black pawn, f7 black pawn, g7 black pawn, h7 black pawn, f6 black knight, d4 white pawn, a2 white pawn, b2 white pawn, c2 white pawn, e2 white pawn, f2 white pawn, g2 white pawn, h2 white pawn, a1 white rook, b1 white knight, c1 white bishop, d1 white queen, e1 white king, f1 white bishop, g1 white knight, h1 white rook
- Moves: 1.d4 Nf6
- ECO: A45–A79; D70–D99; E00–E99
- Parent: Queen's Pawn Game

In chess, Indian Defence or Indian Game is a broad term for a group of openings characterised by the moves:

1. d4 Nf6

They are all to varying degrees hypermodern defences, where Black invites White to establish an imposing presence in the centre with the plan of undermining and ultimately destroying it. Although the Indian defences were championed in the 1920s by players in the hypermodern school, they were not fully accepted until Russian players showed in the late 1940s that these systems are sound for Black. Since then, the Indian defences have become a popular way for Black to respond to 1.d4 because they often offer a balanced game with winning chances for both sides.

Within Indian defences, transpositions are important. Many variations can be reached by several move orders. It is also possible to transpose back into classical openings with 1...d5 such as the Queen's Gambit Declined, Slav Defence, and Semi-Slav Defence; these are not considered "Indian" openings.

The usual second move for White is 2.c4, grabbing a larger share of the centre and preparing for 3.Nc3, which itself prepares for moving the e-pawn to e4 without blocking the c-pawn with the knight. Black's most popular reply is 2...e6, freeing the king's bishop and leading to the Nimzo-Indian Defence, Queen's Indian Defence, Bogo-Indian Defence, Catalan Opening, and others.

Black's main second-move alternative is 2...g6, preparing a fianchetto of the king's bishop and leading to the King's Indian Defence or Grünfeld Defence. Another possibility is 2...c5, a counterstrike in the centre known as the Benoni Defence. Also seen are 2...c6, which usually transposes to the Slav Defence, and 2...d6, the Old Indian Defence.

White's main second-move alternative is 2.Nf3. Black's most common replies are 2...d5, most often transposing to the Queen's Gambit after 3.c4, though White may avoid this by avoiding or delaying c2-c4, often instead playing the London System, Colle System, or Torre Attack; 2...e6, which retains possibilities of transposing to a Queen's Gambit or Queen's Indian Defence; or 2...g6, which may transpose to a King's Indian Defence or Grünfeld Defence. White can also play 2.Bg5, the Trompowsky Attack; 2.Bf4, the Accelerated London System; and 2.Nc3, typically leading to the Richter–Veresov Attack (2...d5 3.Bg5) or Rapport–Jobava System (2...d5 3.Bf4).

== History ==
The earliest known use of the term "Indian Defence" was in 1884, and the name was attributed to the openings used by the Indian player Moheschunder Bannerjee against John Cochrane. Philip W. Sergeant describes Moheschunder as having been as of 1848 "a Brahman in the Mofussil—up country, as we might say—who had never been beaten at chess!" Sergeant wrote in 1934 (substituting algebraic notation for his descriptive notation):

The Indian Defences by g6 coupled with d6, or b6 coupled with e6, were largely taught to European players by the example of Moheschunder and other Indians, to whom the fianchetto developments were a natural legacy from their own game. The fondness for them of the present Indian champion of British chess, Mir Sultan Khan, is well known. But they are now so widely popular that Dr. S. G. Tartakover was able to declare, some years ago, that "to-day fianchettos are trumps." A sequel hardly to have been anticipated from the discovery of Moheschunder in the Mofussil!

In the following game, Moheschunder (Black) plays the Grünfeld Defence against Cochrane in 1855—some 38 years before Ernst Grünfeld was born.

John Cochrane vs Moheschunder Bannerjee, May 1855:
1.d4 Nf6 2.c4 g6 3.Nc3 d5 4.e3 Bg7 5.Nf3 0-0 6.cxd5 Nxd5 7.Be2 Nxc3 8.bxc3 c5 9.0-0 cxd4 10.cxd4 Nc6 11.Bb2 Bg4 12.Rc1 Rc8 13.Ba3 Qa5 14.Qb3 Rfe8 15.Rc5 Qb6 16.Rb5 Qd8 17.Ng5 Bxe2 18.Nxf7 Na5 and White mates in three (19.Nh6+ double check Kh8 20.Qg8+ Rxg8 21.Nf7#).

Another of the games between these players transposed to what would today be called the Four Pawns Attack against the King's Indian Defence. This time Moheschunder, as Black, won after some enterprising (and perhaps dubious) sacrificial play:

1.e4 d6 2.d4 g6 3.c4 Bg7 4.Nc3 Nf6 5.f4 0-0 6.Nf3 Bg4 7.Bd3?! e5?! 8.fxe5 dxe5?! 9.d5 Nxe4!? 10.Nxe4 f5 11.Neg5 e4 12.Ne6 exf3! 13.Nxd8?! fxg2 14.Rg1 Bxd1 15.Ne6 Bg4 16.Nxf8 Kxf8 17.Rxg2 Nd7 18.Bf4 Nc5 19.Kd2 Rc8 20.Kc2 Bf3 21.Rf2 Nxd3 22.Kxd3 Be4+ 23.Ke3 b5 24.cxb5 Bxd5 25.Rd2 Bc4 26.Rad1 Bf6 27.Bh6+ Kg8 28.Kf4 Re8 29.b3 Bxb5 30.Rc1 Be2! 31.Re1 Re4+ 32.Kg3 Bh4+ 0–1

The term "Indian Defence" was popularised by Savielly Tartakower in the early 1920s. In his 1924 book Die hypermoderne Schachpartie, Tartakower classifies the Indian Defences under the broad headings "Old Indian" (...d6 and eventual ...g6) and "Neo-Indian" (...e6 and eventual ...b6). Under the heading "Old Indian", he considers the openings now known as the King's Indian and Grünfeld Defences. He also proposes the names "Proto-Indian" for 1.d4 d6, "Pseudo-Indian" for 1.d4 c5, "Semi-Indian" for 1.d4 Nf6 2.Nc3, and "Three Quarter Indian" for 1.d4 Nf6 2.Nd2, none of which came into wider use.

The modern names "King's Indian Defence", "Queen's Indian Defence", "Old Indian Defence", and "King's Indian Attack" were attributed by Richard Réti to Hans Kmoch, though Réti himself did not approve of these terms. Réti also attributed to Kmoch the terms "All Indian Defence" (where Black fianchettoes both bishops after 1.d4 Nf6) and "Queen's Indian Attack" (where White opens 1.Nf3 and 2.b3) but these did not come into general use.

== 2.c4 e6 ==
=== Nimzo-Indian Defence: 3.Nc3 Bb4 ===
Position: a8 black rook, b8 black knight, c8 black bishop, d8 black queen, e8 black king, h8 black rook, a7 black pawn, b7 black pawn, c7 black pawn, d7 black pawn, f7 black pawn, g7 black pawn, h7 black pawn, e6 black pawn, f6 black knight, b4 black bishop, c4 white pawn, d4 white pawn, c3 white knight, a2 white pawn, b2 white pawn, e2 white pawn, f2 white pawn, g2 white pawn, h2 white pawn, a1 white rook, c1 white bishop, d1 white queen, e1 white king, f1 white bishop, g1 white knight, h1 white rook

Nimzo-Indian Defence

Advocated by Nimzowitsch as early as 1913, the Nimzo-Indian Defence was the first of the Indian systems to gain full acceptance. It remains one of the most popular and well-respected defences to 1.d4, and White often chooses move orders designed to avoid it. Black attacks the centre with pieces and is prepared to trade a bishop for a knight to weaken White's queenside with doubled pawns.

=== Queen's Indian Defence: 3.Nf3 b6 ===
Position: a8 black rook, b8 black knight, c8 black bishop, d8 black queen, e8 black king, f8 black bishop, h8 black rook, a7 black pawn, c7 black pawn, d7 black pawn, f7 black pawn, g7 black pawn, h7 black pawn, b6 black pawn, e6 black pawn, f6 black knight, c4 white pawn, d4 white pawn, f3 white knight, a2 white pawn, b2 white pawn, e2 white pawn, f2 white pawn, g2 white pawn, h2 white pawn, a1 white rook, b1 white knight, c1 white bishop, d1 white queen, e1 white king, f1 white bishop, h1 white rook

Queen's Indian Defence

The Queen's Indian Defence is considered solid, safe, and perhaps somewhat drawish. Black often chooses the Queen's Indian when White avoids the Nimzo-Indian by playing 3.Nf3 instead of 3.Nc3. Black constructs a sound position that makes no positional concessions, although sometimes it is difficult for Black to obtain good winning chances. Karpov is a leading expert in this opening. Many Queen's Indian Defence players also play the Nimzo-Indian Defence, and in fact the line 3.Nf3 b6 4.Nc3 Bb4 is sometimes called the "Nimzo/Queen's Indian Hybrid" or similar, and could be classified under either opening.

=== Bogo-Indian Defence: 3.Nf3 Bb4+ ===
Position: a8 black rook, b8 black knight, c8 black bishop, d8 black queen, e8 black king, h8 black rook, a7 black pawn, b7 black pawn, c7 black pawn, d7 black pawn, f7 black pawn, g7 black pawn, h7 black pawn, e6 black pawn, f6 black knight, b4 black bishop, c4 white pawn, d4 white pawn, f3 white knight, a2 white pawn, b2 white pawn, e2 white pawn, f2 white pawn, g2 white pawn, h2 white pawn, a1 white rook, b1 white knight, c1 white bishop, d1 white queen, e1 white king, f1 white bishop, h1 white rook

Bogo-Indian Defence

The Bogo-Indian Defence is a solid alternative to the Queen's Indian, into which it sometimes transposes. It is less popular than that opening, however, perhaps because many players are loath to surrender the bishop pair (particularly without doubling White's pawns), as Black often ends up doing after 4.Nbd2. The classical 4.Bd2 Qe7 is also often seen, although more recently 4...a5!? and even 4...c5!? have emerged as alternatives. Transposition to the Nimzo-Indian with 4.Nc3 is perfectly playable but rarely seen, since most players who play 3.Nf3 do so in order to avoid that opening.

=== Blumenfeld Gambit: 3.Nf3 c5 4.d5 b5 ===
Position: a8 black rook, b8 black knight, c8 black bishop, d8 black queen, e8 black king, f8 black bishop, h8 black rook, a7 black pawn, d7 black pawn, f7 black pawn, g7 black pawn, h7 black pawn, e6 black pawn, f6 black knight, b5 black pawn, c5 black pawn, d5 white pawn, c4 white pawn, f3 white knight, a2 white pawn, b2 white pawn, e2 white pawn, f2 white pawn, g2 white pawn, h2 white pawn, a1 white rook, b1 white knight, c1 white bishop, d1 white queen, e1 white king, f1 white bishop, h1 white rook

Blumenfeld Gambit

The Blumenfeld Gambit bears a superficial but misleading resemblance to the Benko Gambit, as Black's goals are very different. Black gambits a wing pawn in an attempt to build a strong centre. White can either accept the gambit or decline it to maintain a small positional advantage. Although the Blumenfeld offers dynamic play for Black, it is not very popular due to its riskiness.

=== Catalan Opening: 3.g3 ===
Position: a8 black rook, b8 black knight, c8 black bishop, d8 black queen, e8 black king, f8 black bishop, h8 black rook, a7 black pawn, b7 black pawn, c7 black pawn, d7 black pawn, f7 black pawn, g7 black pawn, h7 black pawn, e6 black pawn, f6 black knight, c4 white pawn, d4 white pawn, g3 white pawn, a2 white pawn, b2 white pawn, e2 white pawn, f2 white pawn, h2 white pawn, a1 white rook, b1 white knight, c1 white bishop, d1 white queen, e1 white king, f1 white bishop, g1 white knight, h1 white rook

Catalan Opening

The Catalan Opening features a quick fianchetto of White's king's bishop. It most often continues 3...d5 4.Bg2. White also often reaches it via transposition with 3.Nf3 d5 4.g3.

=== Neo-Indian Attack: 3.Bg5 ===
Position: a8 black rook, b8 black knight, c8 black bishop, d8 black queen, e8 black king, f8 black bishop, h8 black rook, a7 black pawn, b7 black pawn, c7 black pawn, d7 black pawn, f7 black pawn, g7 black pawn, h7 black pawn, e6 black pawn, f6 black knight, g5 white bishop, c4 white pawn, d4 white pawn, a2 white pawn, b2 white pawn, e2 white pawn, f2 white pawn, g2 white pawn, h2 white pawn, a1 white rook, b1 white knight, d1 white queen, e1 white king, f1 white bishop, g1 white knight, h1 white rook

Neo-Indian Attack

The Neo-Indian Attack is also known as the Seirawan Attack, after top 1980s player Yasser Seirawan. The pinning of the f6-knight looks similar to the Torre Attack, but while the Torre is fairly common, the Neo-Indian is rarely played. The move order has been used by players such as David Janowski against Edward Lasker in New York City 1922. The opening has been considered a possible opening surprise in the Secrets of Opening Surprises series.

The most common responses from Black are:

- 3...h6 which forces the bishop to move again, and unlike the Trompowsky Attack, 4.Bxf6 will not leave Black with doubled pawns.
- 3...Bb4+ which can transpose to the Leningrad Variation of the Nimzo-Indian Defense after 4.Nc3, or lead to unique variations after 4.Nd2.
- 3...c5 4.d5
- 3...Be7

Unless the game transposes to another variation, the Neo-Indian is classified as E00 by the Encyclopaedia of Chess Openings.

=== Other lines ===
- 3...d5 transposes to the Queen's Gambit Declined, or to the Catalan if White plays 3.g3.
- 3...c5 4.d5 exd5 (or 4...d6) transposes to the Modern Benoni.
- 3...Nc6 transposes to the Black Knights' Tango.
- 3.Nf3 a6 prepares for ...b5. It has been played by Roman Dzindzichashvili.
- 3.Nf3 Ne4 transposes to the Döry Defence.
- 3.a3 prevents Black from playing both the Nimzo-Indian and Bogo-Indian. It has been played by Shakhriyar Mamedyarov.
- 3.g4 is the Devin Gambit.

== 2.c4 g6 ==
=== Grünfeld Defence: 3.Nc3 d5 ===
Position: a8 black rook, b8 black knight, c8 black bishop, d8 black queen, e8 black king, f8 black bishop, h8 black rook, a7 black pawn, b7 black pawn, c7 black pawn, e7 black pawn, f7 black pawn, h7 black pawn, f6 black knight, g6 black pawn, d5 black pawn, c4 white pawn, d4 white pawn, c3 white knight, a2 white pawn, b2 white pawn, e2 white pawn, f2 white pawn, g2 white pawn, h2 white pawn, a1 white rook, c1 white bishop, d1 white queen, e1 white king, f1 white bishop, g1 white knight, h1 white rook

Grünfeld Defence

Ernst Grünfeld debuted the Grünfeld Defence in 1922. Distinguished by the move 3...d5, Grünfeld intended it as an improvement to the King's Indian which was not considered entirely satisfactory at that time. The Grünfeld has been adopted by World Champions Smyslov, Fischer, and Kasparov.

=== King's Indian Defence: 3.Nc3 Bg7 ===
Position: a8 black rook, b8 black knight, c8 black bishop, d8 black queen, e8 black king, h8 black rook, a7 black pawn, b7 black pawn, c7 black pawn, d7 black pawn, e7 black pawn, f7 black pawn, g7 black bishop, h7 black pawn, f6 black knight, g6 black pawn, c4 white pawn, d4 white pawn, c3 white knight, a2 white pawn, b2 white pawn, e2 white pawn, f2 white pawn, g2 white pawn, h2 white pawn, a1 white rook, c1 white bishop, d1 white queen, e1 white king, f1 white bishop, g1 white knight, h1 white rook

King's Indian Defence

The King's Indian Defence is aggressive and somewhat risky, and generally indicates that Black will not be satisfied with a draw. Although it was played occasionally as early as the late 19th century, the King's Indian was considered inferior until the 1940s when it was featured in the games of Bronstein, Boleslavsky, and Reshevsky. It was Fischer's favoured defence to 1.d4, but its popularity faded in the mid-1970s. Kasparov's successes with the defence restored the King's Indian to prominence in the 1980s.

=== Other lines ===
Often with the goal of avoiding the Grünfeld, White may decline to play 3.Nc3. The most common are 3.g3 and 3.Nf3, followed by 3.f3, which appeared in the quarterfinals of the Chess World Cup 2025. 3.h4 and 3.d5 are also seen.

== 2.c4, other lines ==
=== Benoni Defence: 2...c5 ===
Position: a8 black rook, b8 black knight, c8 black bishop, d8 black queen, e8 black king, f8 black bishop, h8 black rook, a7 black pawn, b7 black pawn, d7 black pawn, e7 black pawn, f7 black pawn, g7 black pawn, h7 black pawn, f6 black knight, c5 black pawn, c4 white pawn, d4 white pawn, a2 white pawn, b2 white pawn, e2 white pawn, f2 white pawn, g2 white pawn, h2 white pawn, a1 white rook, b1 white knight, c1 white bishop, d1 white queen, e1 white king, f1 white bishop, g1 white knight, h1 white rook

Benoni Defence

The Benoni Defence is a risky attempt by Black to unbalance the position and gain active piece play at the cost of allowing White a pawn wedge at d5 and a central majority. The most common continuations are the Modern Benoni (3.d5 e6 4.Nc3) and Benko Gambit (3.d5 b5). Mikhail Tal popularised the defence in the 1960s by winning several brilliant games with it, and Bobby Fischer occasionally adopted it, with good results, including a win in his 1972 World Championship match against Boris Spassky.

Black often plays 2...e6 before 3...c5 in order to avoid the most challenging lines in the Modern Benoni, as if White plays 3.Nf3 or 3.g3 instead of 3.Nc3, lines such as the Taimanov Attack are no longer possible.

==== Benko Gambit: 3.d5 b5 ====
Position: a8 black rook, b8 black knight, c8 black bishop, d8 black queen, e8 black king, f8 black bishop, h8 black rook, a7 black pawn, d7 black pawn, e7 black pawn, f7 black pawn, g7 black pawn, h7 black pawn, f6 black knight, b5 black pawn, c5 black pawn, d5 white pawn, c4 white pawn, a2 white pawn, b2 white pawn, e2 white pawn, f2 white pawn, g2 white pawn, h2 white pawn, a1 white rook, b1 white knight, c1 white bishop, d1 white queen, e1 white king, f1 white bishop, g1 white knight, h1 white rook

Benko Gambit

In the Benko Gambit (known as the Volga Gambit in Russia and Eastern Europe), Black plays to open lines on the queenside where White will be subject to considerable pressure. If White accepts the gambit, Black's compensation is positional rather than tactical, and their initiative can last even after many piece exchanges and well into the endgame. White often chooses instead either to decline the gambit pawn or return it.

=== Old Indian Defence: 2...d6 3.Nc3 e5 ===
Position: a8 black rook, b8 black knight, c8 black bishop, d8 black queen, e8 black king, f8 black bishop, h8 black rook, a7 black pawn, b7 black pawn, c7 black pawn, f7 black pawn, g7 black pawn, h7 black pawn, d6 black pawn, f6 black knight, e5 black pawn, c4 white pawn, d4 white pawn, c3 white knight, a2 white pawn, b2 white pawn, e2 white pawn, f2 white pawn, g2 white pawn, h2 white pawn, a1 white rook, c1 white bishop, d1 white queen, e1 white king, f1 white bishop, g1 white knight, h1 white rook

Old Indian Defence

The Old Indian Defence was introduced by Tarrasch in 1902, but it is more commonly associated with Chigorin who adopted it five years later. It is similar to the King's Indian in that both feature a ...d6 and ...e5 pawn centre, but in the Old Indian Black's king bishop is developed to e7 rather than being fianchettoed on g7. The Old Indian is solid, but Black's position is usually cramped and it lacks the dynamic possibilities found in the King's Indian.

=== Budapest Gambit: 2...e5 ===
Position: a8 black rook, b8 black knight, c8 black bishop, d8 black queen, e8 black king, f8 black bishop, h8 black rook, a7 black pawn, b7 black pawn, c7 black pawn, d7 black pawn, f7 black pawn, g7 black pawn, h7 black pawn, f6 black knight, e5 white pawn, c4 white pawn, a2 white pawn, b2 white pawn, e2 white pawn, f2 white pawn, g2 white pawn, h2 white pawn, a1 white rook, b1 white knight, c1 white bishop, d1 white queen, e1 white king, f1 white bishop, g1 white knight, h1 white rook

Budapest Gambit Accepted: 3.dxe5

The Budapest Gambit is a sharp line rarely played in grandmaster games, but more often adopted by amateurs. Although it is a gambit, White cannot hold on to their extra pawn without making compromises in the deployment of their pieces, so they often choose to return the pawn and retain the initiative.

=== Others ===
Position: a8 black rook, b8 black knight, c8 black bishop, d8 black queen, e8 black king, f8 black bishop, h8 black rook, a7 black pawn, c7 black pawn, d7 black pawn, e7 black pawn, f7 black pawn, g7 black pawn, h7 black pawn, b6 black pawn, f6 black knight, c4 white pawn, d4 white pawn, a2 white pawn, b2 white pawn, e2 white pawn, f2 white pawn, g2 white pawn, h2 white pawn, a1 white rook, b1 white knight, c1 white bishop, d1 white queen, e1 white king, f1 white bishop, g1 white knight, h1 white rook

Accelerated Queen's Indian Defence
- 2...b6 Accelerated Queen's Indian Defence

The Accelerated Queen's Indian Defence is playable; however, it is considered less accurate than the standard Queen's Indian move order (2...e6 3 Nf3 b6) due to the possibility of 3.Nc3 Bb7 4.Qc2 d5 (otherwise e4 will follow) 5.cxd5 Nxd5 6.Nf3! and White was better in Alekhine–König, Vienna 1922. James Plaskett and Raymond Keene analyse this line in their 1987 book on the English Defence.

- 2...c6

This normally transposes into the Slav Defence if Black subsequently plays ...d5, however it may also transpose into the Old Indian or even the King's Indian if Black instead follows up with ...d6. One of the few independent lines is the offbeat 2...c6 3.Nf3 b5!?, sometimes called the Kudischewitsch gambit after the Israeli IM David Kudischewitsch.

- 2...Nc6 Black Knights' Tango

The Black Knights' Tango or Mexican Defence introduced by Carlos Torre in 1925 in Baden-Baden shares similarities with Alekhine's Defence as Black attempts to induce a premature advance of the white pawns. It may transpose into many other defences.

- 2...d6 3.Nc3 Bf5 Janowski Indian Defence
- 2...d5?! Marshall Defence

The Marshall Defence (normally reached via the Queen's Gambit after 1.d4 d5 2.c4 Nf6?!) is better for White.

== 2.Nf3 ==
Note that lines directly or generally transposing to lines with 2.c4 or 1...d5 are not included in this list. For example, while 2.Nf3 e6 is common, it usually ends up transposing to other openings, particularly as it is often optimal for White to play c4 at some point. There are some independent lines, but they are relatively non-notable.

=== Spielmann-Indian Variation: 2...c5 ===
Position: a8 black rook, b8 black knight, c8 black bishop, d8 black queen, e8 black king, f8 black bishop, h8 black rook, a7 black pawn, b7 black pawn, d7 black pawn, e7 black pawn, f7 black pawn, g7 black pawn, h7 black pawn, f6 black knight, c5 black pawn, d5 white pawn, f3 white knight, a2 white pawn, b2 white pawn, c2 white pawn, e2 white pawn, f2 white pawn, g2 white pawn, h2 white pawn, a1 white rook, b1 white knight, c1 white bishop, d1 white queen, e1 white king, f1 white bishop, h1 white rook

Spielmann-Indian, main line: 2.Nf3 c5 3.d5

The Spielmann-Indian is the equivalent of the Benoni Defence when White plays 2.Nf3 instead of 2.c4. 3.d5 is White's usual reply. It has many similar patterns to the Benoni and transposes outright if White later plays c4. The variation is typically defined by White playing Nc3 without having played c4. Black plans e6 to target the weak d pawn, or d6, g6, and Bg7, while White plans e4 and to press with a space advantage. White can also play various sidelines instead of 3.d5, such as 3.e6 or 3.c6, which often end up transposing into other variations. The opening can also be reached from the Old Benoni if White plays 3.Nf3 after 2.d5 instead of 3.Nc3.

An alternative continuation is 3...b5, the Pseudo-Benko Variation. White usually either transposes to the Benko Gambit Declined with 4.c4 (if Black replies with 4...e6, this reaches the Blumenfeld Gambit) or plays 4.Bg5, with lines quickly branching from there. 4...Qb6 is common to defend the knight. Black usually attempts a queenside attack.

=== East Indian Defence: 2...g6 ===
Position: a8 black rook, b8 black knight, c8 black bishop, d8 black queen, f8 black rook, g8 black king, a7 black pawn, b7 black pawn, e7 black pawn, f7 black pawn, g7 black bishop, h7 black pawn, f6 black knight, g6 black pawn, c5 black pawn, d5 black pawn, e5 white knight, d4 white pawn, f4 white bishop, c3 white knight, e3 white pawn, a2 white pawn, b2 white pawn, c2 white pawn, e2 white bishop, f2 white pawn, g2 white pawn, h2 white pawn, a1 white rook, d1 white queen, e1 white king, h1 white rook

Barry Attack, main line: 4.Bf4 Bg7 5.e3 0-0 6.Be2 c5 7.Ne5

The East Indian Defence is similar to the King's Indian Defence, but with White avoiding c4. If White does play c4, the opening transposes. Commonly, White copies Black's kingside fianchetto plan with g3 and Bg2, or plays Bg5 (the Torre Attack), Bf4 (the London System), or Nbd2, intending to play e4.

The Barry Attack is an aggressive continuation popular with club players. The line usually continues with 4...Bg7 5.e3 0-0 6.Be2 c5 7.Ne5. White intends to follow up with a kingside attack, often playing h4 and h5. The Barry Attack has also been tried out at grandmaster level by Mark Hebden and Julian Hodgson.

This opening has a close kinship to the more-common King's Indian Defence and is often considered a variant thereof. The difference is that White has not yet played c4, and therefore retains some options.

If White plays an early c4, the opening will transpose into a King's Indian. It is also possible for White to support an early e4 advance, transposing into the Pirc Defence. Unless transposition is reached, there are four popular, independent continuations:

- 3.g3, the Przepiórka Variation, closely related to the Fianchetto Variation of the King's Indian
- 3.Bg5, a variant of the Torre Attack
- 3.Bf4, the London System
- 3.Nc3, the Barry Attack

The Encyclopaedia of Chess Openings classifies the East Indian Defence under A49 for the Przepiórka Variation and A48 for the others.

=== Other lines ===
- 2...b6 Accelerated Queen's Indian Defence
  Because of the committal of Nf3, the line beginning with c4 and Nc3 explained in the previous section is not available. This makes the Accelerated Queen's Indian somewhat more commonly played against 2.Nf3 than 2.c4. White often plays 3.c4, inviting transposition to the mainline Queen's Indian Defence via 3...e6, the most common response. Otherwise, the line is considered a transposition to the English Opening, with Black usually continuing with 3...g6 or 3...d5. White also often replies with 3.g3, 3.Bf4, 3.Bg5, or 3.e3, with frequent transpositions.
- 2...d6 Tartakower Defence
  The Tartakower Defence plays d6 with the intention of later playing Nbd7 and e5. With the knight on the d file preventing White from trading queens and forcing Black to retake with the king, White rarely plays dxe5. Black can transpose to the King's Indian or East Indian by later playing g6 and Bg7. White typically responds by transposing to the Old Indian Defence by playing c4 (either on the third move or a later time), fianchettoing with g3 and Bg2, or playing Nc3, which transposes to the Philidor Defence if White later plays e4. White can also play Bg5, or Bf4 (intending the London System), which does temporarily prevent Black from playing e5, but which Black can respond to with Nh5 and potentially h6 and g5, trading off the bishop or chasing it away.
- 2...h6 3.c4 g5 Nadanian Attack
  The Nadanian Attack is an aggressive attempt by Black to unbalance the position. The early 2...h6 and 3...g5 are designed to deal with drawish variations such as Colle System, London System, and Torre Attack. The line was introduced in 2005 by Ashot Nadanian, but has never enjoyed widespread popularity among top-flight players.
- 2...Ne4 Döry Defence
  The Döry Defence (2.Nf3 Ne4 or 2.c4 e6 3.Nf3 Ne4) is uncommon, but was the subject of a theme tournament (won by Paul Keres) in Vienna in 1937. It will sometimes transpose into a variation of the Queen's Indian Defence but there are also independent lines.

== Other lines ==
Position: a8 black rook, b8 black knight, c8 black bishop, d8 black queen, e8 black king, f8 black bishop, h8 black rook, a7 black pawn, b7 black pawn, c7 black pawn, d7 black pawn, e7 black pawn, f7 black pawn, g7 black pawn, h7 black pawn, f6 black knight, d4 white pawn, f4 white bishop, a2 white pawn, b2 white pawn, c2 white pawn, e2 white pawn, f2 white pawn, g2 white pawn, h2 white pawn, a1 white rook, b1 white knight, d1 white queen, e1 white king, f1 white bishop, g1 white knight, h1 white rook

London System against 1...Nf6

Each of these lines are commonly played on either the second or third move, with the second move otherwise usually being 2.Nf3.

- 2.Bf4 or 3.Bf4 London System
  The London System is more common against 1...d5, but still common against 1...Nf6. White plans to follow up with e3 and Nf3. The line often transposes to 1...d5 Londons once Black plays d5, but Black often plays c5 before playing d5, intending Qb6, threatening White's b pawn, which has been left unguarded after Bf4. Alternatively, Black can play g6, intending Bg7. White often plays Nc3 in response, entering the Rapport–Jobava System, which threatens a double attack of White's bishop and knight on c7 if the knight moves to b5. If Black later plays d5, this allows White to play the Barry Attack mentioned in the previous section.
- 2.Bg5 or 3.Bg5
  - 2.Bg5 Trompowsky Attack
  - 2.Nf3 e6 3.Bg5 Torre Attack
  - 2.Nf3 g6 3.Bg5 Torre Attack, Fianchetto Defence
  - 2.c4 e6 3.Bg5 Neo-Indian Attack
  The Trompowsky Attack, Torre Attack, and Neo-Indian Attack are anti-Indian variations that aim to disrupt Black's typical development after 1...Nf6 with an early Bg5, and avoid much of the detailed theory of mainstream lines. For example, in the Trompowsky, an early trade with Bxf6 exf6 or Bxf6 gxf6 that results in doubled pawns for Black can occur, a development rarely seen in other openings. The Richter–Veresov Attack is a similar opening which can be played against 1...d5, or arrived at via transposition against 1...Nf6, such as with 1.d4 Nf6 2.Nc3 d5 3.Bg5.
- 2.Nc3 or 3.Nc3
  This move usually ends up transposing either to the Rapport–Jobava System after White plays Bf4, or the Richter–Veresov Attack after White plays Bg5.
- 2.e3 or 3.e3 Yusupov–Rubinstein System
  The Yusupov–Rubinstein System is the equivalent of the Colle System against 1...Nf6. White typically develops the queen's bishop to b2 or leaves it on c1 during the opening phase of the game.

== See also ==
- List of chess openings
- List of chess openings named after places
