= Bogoljubov–Mikenas Defense =

Chess opening

Position: a8 black rook, c8 black bishop, d8 black queen, e8 black king, f8 black bishop, g8 black knight, h8 black rook, a7 black pawn, b7 black pawn, c7 black pawn, d7 black pawn, e7 black pawn, f7 black pawn, g7 black pawn, h7 black pawn, c6 black knight, d4 white pawn, a2 white pawn, b2 white pawn, c2 white pawn, e2 white pawn, f2 white pawn, g2 white pawn, h2 white pawn, a1 white rook, b1 white knight, c1 white bishop, d1 white queen, e1 white king, f1 white bishop, g1 white knight, h1 white rook
- Moves: 1.d4 Nc6
- ECO: A40
- Parent: Queen's Pawn Game
- Synonyms: Nimzowitsch Queen Pawn Defense; Queen's Knight Defense; Lundin (Kevitz–Mikenas) Defense

The Bogoljubov–Mikenas Defense (also known as the Queen's Knight Defense, Nimzowitsch Queen Pawn Defense, or Lundin Defense) is a chess opening defined by the moves:

1. d4 Nc6

Unless the game transposes to another opening, the Encyclopedia of Chess Openings classifies the opening with the code A40.

== Discussion ==
This opening was tried by some hypermodern players such as Aron Nimzowitsch and Efim Bogoljubov, but it has never become very popular. The move 1...Nc6 is a fairly committal move which blocks Black's c-pawn; usually Black delays playing it until White's setup is clear.

Most games featuring 1.d4 Nc6 transpose to other openings. After 2.e4 the Nimzowitsch Defense arises. After 2.Nf3 d5 a variation of the Queen's Pawn Game is possible. After 2.c4 d5 the opening is a Chigorin Defense.

There are some lines that are unique to 1.d4 Nc6, most importantly 2.d5 which chases the knight away, usually to e5. The opening resembles an Alekhine's Defence but on the opposite side of the board. In an opening book by Sid Pickard, this variation was called the Bozo-Indian Defense ("Bozo" being a combination of the prefixes "Nimzo" and "Bogo"), although it is not an Indian opening, as those involve the move ...Nf6.

The Bogoljubov–Mikenas Defense was featured (although not mentioned by name) in the season four episode of Chuck entitled "Chuck Versus the Family Volkoff".

== Transpositions ==
After 1.d4 Nc6 Black should be ready for various continuations; however, White cannot just ignore the fact that Black is ready to play ...e5 in the next move. Therefore, practically speaking, White is likely to play the move 2.Nf3, trying to reach a position with a theoretical advantage. Black could respond to Nf3 with two main moves:

- 2...d6 can transpose to the Pirc Defense (if Black successfully plays d6 and g6, White must play e4 and go into Open Game theory) or the King's Indian Defence if White plays an early c4.
  Unusual sequences after 2.Nf3 d6:
  - Dutch Defence – 3.g3 g6 4.Bg2 Bg7 5.0-0 f5 6.d5
  - Ruy Lopez – 3.e4 e5 4.Bb5 exd4 5.Qxd4
- 2...e6 can transpose to the Nimzo-Indian Defence, Bogo-Indian Defence and the Chigorin Defense if White plays c4 immediately. If White tries going for an open game, the game can transpose to a Guimard French or another French line with 4...e5, or the Nimzowitsch Defence.

== Illustrative games ==
Erich Weinitschke vs. Efim Bogoljubov, Bad Elster, Germany, 1938
[Analysis by Sid Pickard]

A splendid example of dynamism concealed in Black's opening. 1. d4 Nc6 2. d5 Ne5 3. f4 Ng6 4. e4 e5 This position more commonly occurs from the Nimzowitsch Defense by 1.e4 Nc6 2.d4 e5 3.d5 Nce7 4.f4 Ng6. 5. f5 More cautious would be 5.dxe6, though after 5...fxe6, Black has the open f-file as a base for counterattack. 5... Qh4+ 6. Kd2 Qxe4 7. fxg6 Qxd5+ 8. Ke1 Qxd1+ 9. Kxd1 hxg6 10. Nc3 c6 11. Nf3 f6 12. Bd3 Storing up trouble. White's minor pieces become potentially exposed to Black's advancing pawns. In order to make a game of it, White had to play 12.Be2. 12... Ne7 13. Re1 d5 Black's opening sacrifice has been a complete success. He controls the center and his three pawns outweigh White's extra piece, but this is a somewhat forlorn gesture. 14. h3 e4 15. Bxe4 dxe4 16. Nxe4 Kf7 17. Bd2 Nf5 18 .b3 g5 19. Ke2 Nd6 20. Nf2 Bf5 21. Nd4 Bg6 22. Kf1 Nf5 23. Ne2 Bc5 24. Ne4 Bb6 Black's task is easy. He has an extra pawn, two bishops, and better development. 25. c4 Rad8 26. Red1 Rxd2 27. Nxd2 Ne3+ And White resigned here in view of 28.Ke1 Nxg2+ 29.Kf1 Ne3+ 30.Ke1 Rxh3. 0–1
