= Queen's Pawn Game =

Chess opening

Position: a8 black rook, b8 black knight, c8 black bishop, d8 black queen, e8 black king, f8 black bishop, g8 black knight, h8 black rook, a7 black pawn, b7 black pawn, c7 black pawn, d7 black pawn, e7 black pawn, f7 black pawn, g7 black pawn, h7 black pawn, d4 white pawn, a2 white pawn, b2 white pawn, c2 white pawn, e2 white pawn, f2 white pawn, g2 white pawn, h2 white pawn, a1 white rook, b1 white knight, c1 white bishop, d1 white queen, e1 white king, f1 white bishop, g1 white knight, h1 white rook
- Moves: 1.d4
- ECO: A40–A99; D00–D99; E00–E99
- Synonyms: d4; Queen's Pawn Opening

The Queen's Pawn Game is any chess opening starting with the move:

1. d4

It is the second most popular opening move in chess after 1.e4, the King's Pawn Game.

== History ==
In the 19th century and early 20th century, 1.e4 was by far the most common opening move by White (Watson 2006:87), while the different openings starting with 1.d4 were considered somewhat unusual and therefore classed together as "Queen's Pawn Game". As the merits of 1.d4 started to be explored, the Queen's Gambit became the dominant continuation, being more popular than all other 1.d4 openings combined. The term "Queen's Pawn Game" then evolved to be used with a narrower meaning to refer to any opening with 1.d4 that was not a Queen's Gambit. Eventually, through the efforts of the hypermodernists, the various Indian Defences (such as the King's Indian, Nimzo-Indian, and Queen's Indian) became more popular, and as these openings were named, the term "Queen's Pawn Game" narrowed further.

== Opening categorization and continuations ==
The term Queen's Pawn Game can either be used to describe all openings beginning with 1.d4, or only those where White does not play the Queen's Gambit (1...d5 2.c4); 1...Nf6 2.c4 may also be treated separately. In the Encyclopaedia of Chess Openings (ECO), openings where Black does not play 1...d5 are called Semi-Closed Games. The use of Queen's Pawn Game as a description occurs more frequently than use of the term King's Pawn Game for 1.e4. Other than the Queen's Gambit, common Queen's Pawn Game openings are:

- The London System, 2.Bf4 or 2.Nf3 and 3.Bf4
- The Trompowsky Attack, 1...Nf6 2.Bg5 and the Pseudo-Trompowsky 1...d5 2.Bg5
- The Torre Attack, 2.Nf3 and 3.Bg5
- The Stonewall Attack, 2.e3
- The Colle System, 2.Nf3 and 3.e3
- The King's Fianchetto Opening, 2.Nf3 and 3.g3
- The Barry Attack, 1...Nf6 2.Nf3 g6 3.Nc3 d5 4.Bf4
- The Richter–Veresov Attack, 1...d5 2.Nc3 Nf6 3.Bg5 or 1...Nf6 2.Nc3 d5 3.Bg5
- The Blackmar–Diemer Gambit, 1...d5 2.e4, and the Hübsch Gambit 1...Nf6 2.Nc3 d5 3.e4

The Black responses given below, some with their ECO codes, are ranked in order of popularity according to ChessBase for FIDE-rated games.

=== Common moves ===
- 1...Nf6, the Indian Defence (A45–A79, D70–D99, E00–E99), is the most common. The move prevents White from establishing a full pawn centre with 2.e4. Play often transposes to versions of the Queen's Gambit if Black plays ...d5 at some point. Since 1...Nf6 is a move that is likely to be made anyway, the move is a flexible response to White's first move. White usually plays 2.c4. Then Black tends to play 2...e6 (leading to the Nimzo-Indian Defence and others) or 2...g6 (leading to the King's Indian Defence or Grünfeld Defence), but also seen are 2...c5 (Benoni Defence), 2...e5 (Budapest Gambit), and 2...d6 (Old Indian Defence). Alternatively, White might play moves like 2.Nf3, or 2.Bg5, the Trompowsky Attack.
- 1...d5, leading to the Closed Games (D00–D69), also prevents White from playing 2.e4 unless White wants to venture the dubious Blackmar–Diemer Gambit. White's most common response is 2.c4, the Queen's Gambit. Black usually chooses between 2...e6, the (traditional or orthodox) Queen's Gambit Declined; 2...c6, the Slav Defence; or 2...dxc4, the Queen's Gambit Accepted. White also frequently plays 2.Nf3, which tends to transpose into other lines; for example, a Queen's Gambit may arise if White plays c4 afterward, but lines like the Colle System or London System are also possible. Committing the pawn to d5 at once makes 1...d5 less flexible than 1...Nf6 since Black can no longer avoid Queen's Gambit positions, though Black might prefer this.
- 1...e6, the Franco-Indian Defence, is a chess opening characterised by the moves 1.d4 e6. This play allows White to play 2.e4, transposing to the French Defence. If White wants to continue with a Queen's Pawn Game, however, 2.c4 and 2.Nf3 usually transpose to a familiar opening, such as the Queen's Gambit Declined. A line that is unique to the 1...e6 move order is the 1.d4 e6 2.c4 Bb4+, the Keres Defence (A40).
- 1...d6, the Pillsbury Defence (A41), often continues 2.e4, also reached via 1.e4 d6 2.d4. After the usual 2...Nf6 3.Nc3, 3...g6 reaches the Pirc Defence and 3...e5 4.Nf3 reaches the Philidor Defence; 3...c6 and 3...Nbd7 are also possible. If Black avoids transposing with e4, 2.c4 may lead to a King's Indian Defence or Old Indian Defence. 2.Nf3 may reach any of the earlier mentioned lines, or Black may play 2...Bg4. 2.c4 e5 is another independent line.
- 1...f5, the Dutch Defence (A80-A99), is an unbalancing line that has been described as the 1.d4 equivalent of the Sicilian Defence, but it has a less sound reputation and is much rarer. Common White replies are 2.g3, 2.Nf3, and 2.c4.
- 1...g6 is sometimes called the Modern Defence line. White can play 2.e4 to enter the Modern Defence but 2.c4 is more typical. Black can play 2...Nf6, transposing to the King's Indian Defence, or 2...Bg7, where White's moves include 3.Nc3 and 3.e4, which often lead to the Averbakh System of the Modern Defence. 2...d6 is an alternative for Black. 3.Nf3, 2.Nf3, and 3.e4 are possible and often transpose to another line.
- 1...c6 allows White to play 2.e4, transposing to the Caro–Kann Defence. If, however, White wants to continue with a Queen's Pawn Game, 2.c4 and 2.Nf3 can transpose to a more familiar opening, such as the Slav Defence after 2.c4 d5.
- 1...c5 is the Old Benoni Defence. It is less common than the standard Benoni Defence (1...Nf6 2.c4 c5).

=== Rare moves ===
- 1...Nc6 is the Bogoljubov–Mikenas Defense, named after Efim Bogoljubov and Vladas Mikėnas, and also called the Queen's Knight Defence. Transposition to the Chigorin Defence or the Nimzowitsch Defence is not uncommon.
- 1...b6 is the English Defence. Common White moves are 2.e4 (which transposes to Owen's Defence), 2.Nf3, and 2.c4.
- 1...b5 is the Polish Defence, a risky line that should be played with care. Delaying ...b5 until the 2nd move is better.
- 1...a6 can quickly transpose to the St. George Defence.
- 1...e5?! is the Englund Gambit, which gives up a pawn for questionable compensation.

== See also ==
- List of chess openings
- Closed Game
