= Black Knights' Tango =

Position: a8 black rook, c8 black bishop, d8 black queen, e8 black king, f8 black bishop, h8 black rook, a7 black pawn, b7 black pawn, c7 black pawn, d7 black pawn, e7 black pawn, f7 black pawn, g7 black pawn, h7 black pawn, c6 black knight, f6 black knight, c4 white pawn, d4 white pawn, a2 white pawn, b2 white pawn, e2 white pawn, f2 white pawn, g2 white pawn, h2 white pawn, a1 white rook, b1 white knight, c1 white bishop, d1 white queen, e1 white king, f1 white bishop, g1 white knight, h1 white rook
- Moves: 1.d4 Nf6 2.c4 Nc6
- ECO: A50
- Origin: Friedrich Sämisch vs. Carlos Torre Repetto, Baden-Baden 1925
- Named after: Black's first moves Nf6 and Nc6
- Parent: Indian Defence
- Synonyms: Mexican Defense; Two Knights' Tango; Kevitz–Trajkovic Defense

The Black Knights' Tango (also known as the Mexican Defense, Two Knights' Tango or Kevitz–Trajkovic Defense) is a chess opening beginning with the moves:

1. d4 Nf6
2. c4 Nc6

This position can also be reached by transposition, for example 1.c4 Nf6, 1.d4 Nc6, or 1.c4 Nc6.

== History ==
The opening originated in the 1920s, when it was played by both the Mexican grandmaster Carlos Torre (hence the name "Mexican Defense") and the American master Alexander Kevitz (the "Kevitz" in "Kevitz–Trajkovic Defense"). Torre used it to defeat then-U.S. Chess Champion Frank James Marshall in only seven moves. It was later played by the Yugoslav master Mihailo Trajkovic and the Soviet grandmaster Anatoly Lutikov.

After decades of obscurity, the opening was revitalized by the International Master Georgi Orlov, who published a booklet and a book about it in 1992 and 1998, respectively. Orlov rechristened the opening the "Black Knights' Tango".

Since 1992, the opening has been employed by a number of strong grandmasters, including Victor Bologan, Joel Benjamin, Larry Christiansen, and Alex Yermolinsky. Yermolinsky has even ventured it against Garry Kasparov.

== Basic ideas ==
Although fairly uncommon, the "Tango" has a sounder positional basis than most other offbeat openings: Black develops quickly, has a flexible pawn structure, and is prepared to strike back in the center with 3...e5, or with ...e6 and ...d5. The opening has some distinct variations but it is highly transpositional, and may transpose to the King's Indian Defense, Nimzo-Indian Defense, Bogo-Indian Defense, Chigorin Defense, Ragozin System, Catalan Opening, and English Opening.

== Possible continuations ==
=== 3.Nf3 ===
The most common move, preventing 3...e5. Black usually responds with 3...e6, although 3...d6, intending a kind of Old Indian Defense, is also possible. After 3...e6, White can play 4.Nc3 Bb4 (transposing to the Nimzo-Indian Defense); 4.a3, when Black can either play 4...d5 (reaching a kind of Queen's Gambit Declined or Ragozin System), or 4...d6 preparing 5...e5 or even 5...g6 ("championed by Bologan", according to Palliser), reaching a sort of King's Indian Defense; or 4.g3, when Black can transpose to the Catalan Opening with 4...d5, recommended by Palliser or 4...Bb4+, preferred by Orlov, which transposes to a Nimzo-Indian after 5.Nc3, or to a Bogo-Indian Defense after 5.Bd2 or 5.Nbd2.

=== 3.Nc3 ===
This is White's second-most popular move. After the thematic 3...e5, one possibility for White is 4.Nf3, transposing to an English Opening. Palliser recommends 4...e4!? in response, while Orlov prefers 4...exd4 5.Nxd4 Bb4. Instead, the main line is 4.d5 Ne7. Now the game may continue in "Tango" fashion, for example with 5.Nf3 Ng6, or transpose to the King's Indian Defense with, for example, 5.Nf3 d6 6.e4 (6.Bg5!?) g6 7.Be2 Bg7 8.0-0 0-0, reaching the main line of the King's Indian by transposition.

Another interesting but relatively unexplored idea is 3...e6, allowing White to play 4.e4 (other moves such as 4.d5, 4.Bg5, 4.a3, 4.f3, and 4.Nf3 are also possible), whereupon Black follows up with 4...d5. From that position, the main possibilities are 5.e5 (the main line), 5.exd5, 5.cxd5, and 5.Bg5. These possibilities can also be reached via transposition from the Mikenas–Carls Variation of the English Opening (1.c4 Nf6 2.Nc3 e6 3.e4), although if Black wishes to play this way, the optimal move order is 1.d4 Nf6 2.c4 e6 3.Nc3 Nc6.

=== 3.d5 ===
Position: a8 black rook, c8 black bishop, e8 black king, h8 black rook, a7 black pawn, b7 black pawn, c7 black pawn, d7 black pawn, f7 black pawn, g7 black pawn, h7 black pawn, g6 black knight, d5 white pawn, e5 white pawn, b4 black bishop, f4 white pawn, h4 black queen, d3 white bishop, f3 white knight, g3 black knight, a2 white pawn, b2 white pawn, d2 white bishop, h2 white pawn, a1 white rook, b1 white knight, d1 white queen, e1 white king, h1 white rook

Position after 11.Nf3

Position: a8 black rook, c8 black bishop, e8 black king, h8 black rook, a7 black pawn, b7 black pawn, c7 black pawn, d7 black pawn, f7 black pawn, g7 black pawn, h7 black pawn, d5 white pawn, e5 white pawn, f4 black knight, h4 black queen, f3 white knight, g3 black knight, a2 white pawn, b2 white pawn, d2 white knight, h2 white pawn, a1 white rook, d1 white queen, e1 white king, f1 white bishop, h1 white rook

Position after 13.Nbxd2

This ambitious move is playable but rarely seen. Black normally responds with 3...Ne5. Then after 4.e4 (inviting 4...Nxe4?? 5.Qd4 winning a knight), Black struck back in the center with 4...Ng6 5.f4 e5 in the seminal game Sämisch–Torre, Moscow 1925. Orlov considers both Torre's fourth and fifth moves inferior, however. He and Palliser both recommend 4...e6 instead, after which play can become extremely sharp. For example, Elburg–Simmelink, correspondence 1999 continued 5.f4 Ng6 6.Bd3 exd5 7.e5?! Ne4 8.cxd5 Qh4+ 9.g3 Bb4+! 10.Bd2? (Better is 10.Nc3! Nxc3! 11.bxc3 Bxc3+ 12.Bd2 Bxd2+ 13.Qxd2 Qe7 14.Nf3 d6 15.Bb5+! Kf8 16.Qc3 with some practical chances for the sacrificed pawn.) 10...Nxg3 11.Nf3 (first diagram) Nxf4! 12.Bf1! (12.Nxh4?? Nxd3#!; 12.Bxb4? Nxd3+ 13.Qxd3 Qxb4+ is hopeless for White.) 12...Bxd2+ 13.Nbxd2 (second diagram; 13.Qxd2? Nxf1+ 14.Nxh4 Nxd2 is winning for Black.) Qh3! 14.Rg1 (White cannot take either of Black's two hanging pieces: 14.Bxh3 Nd3#; 14.hxg3 Qxg3#. Nor is 14.Ng5 Qg2! any better.) 14...Nxf1 left Black with two extra pawns.
