= Moheschunder Bannerjee =

Indian chess player

Moheschunder Bannerjee or Mahesh Chandra Banerjee was a chess player from Bengal, many hundred of whose games survive through the writings of John Cochrane, who regularly played Bannerjee between 1848 and 1860, during Cochrane's tenure at the Calcutta bar. His first name is sometimes misspelled Mohishunder, though Mahescandra is a variant.

Moheshchunder, also known as "the Brahmin", was a player from the mofussil or suburbs of Calcutta. He played traditional Indian chess, which in Bengal at the time, pawns did not have the option of moving two squares from the starting row and pawns would promote to the piece of the square reached. Also Bengal chess rules did not have castling, but an unchecked king could execute a knight's move once during a game. However, there is little difference in the middlegame and many Indian chess players were very strong tacticians. Bannerjee is likely to have transitioned to western rules after contact with Cochrane and other Europeans.

Among his contributions to mainstream chess is the class of openings now called Indian Defence. An even greater contribution from him is the hugely complicated and popular Grünfeld Defence which was first introduced, and then regularly used by him against Cochrane.

== Career ==
What little is known of Moheschunder comes from articles that John Cochrane, stationed at Calcutta in the 1840s, wrote for the London chess magazines. It appears that Cochrane, who had defeated every player in England barring his protégé Howard Staunton, had been searching for some worthy opponents for some time. In the autumn of 1848, a member of the Calcutta Chess club heard of a Brahmin in a village (mofussil) who had never been beaten at chess. He found an opportunity of meeting him, played him, and lost. It was stated that the man, 'Moheschunder Bonnerjee, a Brahmin', of about 50, hardly knew the European rules of chess; yet his play was presumably under European rules.

This club member brought Bannerjee back to Calcutta with him. Cochrane played him and won, but was impressed. Banerjee was engaged as "a paid attaché" of the Chess Club, where he improved wonderfully. In the Chess Player's Chronicle for 1851 are published some games between Cochrane and Moheschunder; and "the Brahmin" figures as a player in various collections of games. The Indian Defences by g6 coupled with d6, or b6 coupled with e6, were largely taught to European players by the example of Moheschunder and other Indians, to whom the fianchetto developments were a natural legacy from their own game. It is notable that many of Bannerjee's openings were based on single pawn moves, the "legacy" mentioned by Sergeant, as in the rules of Indian chess.

Cochrane is quoted in a letter written by a member of the Calcutta Chess Club, appearing in the Chess Player's Chronicle in 1850:

The only player here who has any chance whatever with Mr Cochrane, upon even terms, is a Brahmin of the name of Moheschunder Bonnerjee. Of this worthy, Mr Cochrane has himself remarked that he possesses as great a natural talent for chess as any player he ever met with, without one single exception.

=== Games ===
Among his recorded games is the first instance of Gruenfeld Defence, more than 60 years before Ernst Grünfeld was to launch it against Alekhine at Vienna, 1922:

John Cochrane vs. Moheschunder Bannerjee, May 1855 (in PGN format)
[Event "Introduction to Gruenfeld defence"]

[Site "Kolkata, India"] [Date "May 1851"] [Round "1"] [White "John Cochrane"] [Black "Mahesh Chandra Banerjee"] [Result "Black resigned"] 1. d4 Nf6 2. c4 g6 3. Nc3 d5 4. e3 Bg7 5. Nf3 0-0 6. cxd5 Nxd5 7. Be2 Nxc3 8. bxc3 c5 9 .0-0 cxd4 10. cxd4 Nc6 11. Bb2 Bg4 12. Rc1 Rc8 13. Ba3 Qa5 14. Qb3 Rfe8 15. Rc5 Qb6 16. Rb5 Qd8 17. Ng5 Bxe2 18. Nxf7 Na5 and White mates in three (19.Nh6+ double check Kh8 20.Qg8+ Rxg8 21.Nf7#).

Moheshchunder had a flair for dramatic play evidenced by his sacrifices in this King's Indian Defence game (a variation known today as the Four Pawns Attack):

John Cochrane vs. Moheschunder Bannerjee
1.e4 d6 2.d4 g6 3.c4 Bg7 4.Nc3 Nf6 5.f4 0-0 6.Nf3 Bg4 7.Bd3? e5! 8.fxe5 dxe5 9.d5 Nxe4!? 10.Nxe4 f5 11.Neg5 e4 12.Ne6 exf3! 13.Nxd8?! fxg2 14.Rg1 Bxd1 15.Ne6 Bg4 16.Nxf8 Kxf8 17.Rxg2 Nd7 18.Bf4 Nc5 19.Kd2 Rc8 20.Kc2 Bf3 21.Rf2 Nxd3 22.Kxd3 Be4+ 23.Ke3 b5 24.cxb5 Bxd5 25.Rd2 Bc4 26.Rad1 Bf6 27.Bh6+ Kg8 28.Kf4 Re8 29.b3 Bxb5 30.Rc1 Be2 31.Re1?? (The position is even after 31 Kg3.) Re4+ 32.Kg3 Bh4+ 0–1

== The origin of the name "Indian Defence" ==
Moheshchunder, like other Indian players of the time, favoured fianchettoed openings, trying to control the centre with long-distance pieces rather than occupying it with the pawns. Possibly these ideas germinated in an environment of chess rules that did not permit the initial two-square move for pawns. The theory behind these openings were developed in recorded chess history much later, but Cochrane introduced the term Indian defence for this class of openings, which has now come to cover the Nimzo-Indian and many other popular openings. Fianchettoes appear to have been a favourite style in Indian chess variants, and the Queen's Indian defence was also a frequent opening for Mir Sultan Khan, who visited England for five years and won the British Chess Championship in 1929, 1932 and 1933.
