= Barry Attack =

Chess opening

Position: d4 white pawn, f4 white bishop, c3 white knight, e3 white pawn, f3 white knight, a2 white pawn, b2 white pawn, c2 white pawn, e2 white bishop, f2 white pawn, g2 white pawn, h2 white pawn, a1 white rook, d1 white queen, e1 white king, h1 white rook

The Barry Attack, initial setup

The Barry Attack is a chess opening system for White that usually arises via the move order 1.d4 Nf6 2.Nf3 g6 3.Nc3 d5 4.Bf4. Black usually plays 4...Bg7 after which the most popular continuation is 5.e3 0-0 6.Be2; however, 5.Qd2, the "Tarzan Attack", is also playable. It uses the same setup for white as the Jobava London.

The Barry Attack is a Queen's Pawn Opening (ECO code D00) and is normally used against Black defenses such as the King's Indian Defense, the East Indian Defense, and the Pirc Defense. Noted regular practitioners of this opening include GMs Niaz Murshed, Mark Hebden, and also Aaron Summerscale, who wrote the book A Killer Chess Opening Repertoire surveying both the Barry Attack and the related 150 Attack.

== Characteristics ==
The effectiveness of the Barry Attack has been analyzed and debated extensively by both proponents and detractors. The opening normally involves an aggressive kingside attack by White, often including the sacrifice of one or more of White's pieces to set up a checkmate. An instructive game is GM Pavel Blatny–Martin Fette, Vienna 1991, in which Blatny forced his opponent's king into the middle of the board and had mate in one after 23.e4:

1.d4 Nf6 2.Nf3 g6 3.Nc3 d5 4.Bf4 Bg7 5.e3 Bg4 6.Be2 c6 7.Ne5 Bxe2 8.Qxe2 Nbd7 9.0-0-0 0-0 10.h4 Qa5 11.h5 Nxe5 12.dxe5 Ne4 13.hxg6 Nxc3 14.Qh5 Nxa2+ 15.Kb1 fxg6 16.Qxh7+ Kf7 17.Bh6 Rg8 18.Rh4 g5 19.Bxg7 gxh4 20.Bf6+ Ke6 21.Qxe7+ Kf5 22.Qh7+ Ke6 23.e4 1–0 (Black resigns)
