= Richter–Veresov Attack =

Chess opening

Position: a8 black rook, b8 black knight, c8 black bishop, d8 black queen, e8 black king, f8 black bishop, h8 black rook, a7 black pawn, b7 black pawn, c7 black pawn, e7 black pawn, f7 black pawn, g7 black pawn, h7 black pawn, f6 black knight, d5 black pawn, g5 white bishop, d4 white pawn, c3 white knight, a2 white pawn, b2 white pawn, c2 white pawn, e2 white pawn, f2 white pawn, g2 white pawn, h2 white pawn, a1 white rook, d1 white queen, e1 white king, f1 white bishop, g1 white knight, h1 white rook
- Moves: 1.d4 d5 2.Nc3 Nf6 3.Bg5
- ECO: D01
- Origin: 1902
- Named after: Kurt Richter; Gavriil Veresov
- Parent: Closed Game
- Synonym: Veresov Opening

The Richter–Veresov Attack (or Veresov Opening) is a chess opening that begins with the moves:

1. d4 d5
2. Nc3 Nf6
3. Bg5

It is also often reached by transposition, for example 1.d4 Nf6 2.Nc3 d5 3.Bg5 (the most common move order), 1.d4 Nf6 2.Bg5 d5 3.Nc3, or 1.Nc3 Nf6 2.d4 d5 3.Bg5.

The opening was named after the German International Master Kurt Richter and later the Soviet master Gavriil Veresov, who played it frequently for over a quarter of a century.

Along with the Trompowsky Attack, Colle System, London System, and Torre Attack, the Richter–Veresov Attack is one of the more common branches of the Queen's Pawn Game. The Richter–Veresov Attack looks like the more popular Ruy Lopez opening mirrored on the queenside, but the dynamics of play are quite different.

The Encyclopaedia of Chess Openings code for the Richter–Veresov Attack is D01.

== Incremental development ==
The opening dates back as far as the game Marshall–Wolf, Monte Carlo 1902. However, it was Savielly Tartakower who played it regularly in the 1920s and even to the end of his life, using it in his victory over Donner at Staunton Centenary 1951. Tartakower's interpretation and treatment of the opening generally led to a closed, manoeuvring game.

Kurt Richter was the next player to develop new ideas in the opening, during the 1930s. He mostly found it useful to facilitate his risk-taking style, and he produced some dazzling victories which contributed to a whole chapter of his book of best games. Some theoreticians refer to the opening as the Richter Attack.

It was Gavriil Veresov, however, who greatly strengthened both the theory and practice of the opening from World War II to his heyday in the 1950s and 1960s. He is credited with demonstrating that the opening contained more subtlety and depth than was previously considered, often culminating in a central advance or direct assault on the enemy king. As a tool for rapid piece development, it resembled a king pawn opening, and required fewer pawn moves than standard queen pawn fare.

The opening has never been very popular at the top level, though various prominent players have employed it on occasion. In 1959, for example, David Bronstein played the Richter Attack against Veresov himself.

== The Veresov today ==
Moving into the last third of the 20th century, grandmasters of the calibre of Spassky, Tal, Smyslov, Larsen, and Bronstein all experimented with the Veresov Opening as an occasional surprise weapon. Even Karpov employed it with success against Romanishin in a Soviet Team Championship. Other, more frequent practitioners have included Héctor Rossetto, Lev Alburt, Victor Ciocaltea, Nikola Padevsky, and Tony Miles.

In more contemporary play, the system has remained popular. Grandmaster Jonny Hector has become an adherent of the Veresov and some interest has also been shown by leading GM Alexander Morozevich.

After 3.Bg5 (diagram), Black's most popular choices are 3...Nbd7, 3...e6, 3...Bf5, 3...c6, and 3...c5, all potentially leading to different variations. White's plans typically include rapid queenside castling and an early f3 and e4.

After the Black reply 3...Bf5, Richter usually continued 4.f3, intending to build a large pawn centre; Veresov, on the other hand, usually played 4.Bxf6, damaging the black pawn structure. Today, these two lines are known, respectively, as the Richter Variation and Veresov Variation.

== See also ==
- List of chess openings
- List of chess openings named after people
