= José Joaquín Araiza =

Mexican chess player (1900–1971)

José Joaquín Araiza Vázquez (23 March 1900 – 27 September 1971) was a Mexican chess master.

In 1926 in Mexico City, Araiza took second place, behind Carlos Torre. In 1928, he tied for twelfth/fourteenth place in The Hague (Amateur World Championship; Max Euwe won). In 1930, he took eleventh place in San Remo (Alexander Alekhine won). In 1930, he took eighth place in Nice (Savielly Tartakower won).

In 1932, he took eleventh in Pasadena (Alekhine won). In 1932 in Mexico City Araiza organized and played in the first international tournament held in Mexico, taking third place behind Alekhine and Isaac Kashdan. In 1934, he took eighth place in Chicago (Samuel Reshevsky and Reuben Fine won). In 1934, he took thirteenth place in Syracuse (Reshevsky won). In 1934/35, he took fourth place in Mexico City, behind Fine, Herman Steiner and Arthur Dake. In 1945, he tied for ninth/tenth place in Hollywood (Reshevsky won).
