= Devin Gambit =

Chess opening

Position: a8 black rook, b8 black knight, c8 black bishop, d8 black queen, e8 black king, f8 black bishop, h8 black rook, a7 black pawn, b7 black pawn, c7 black pawn, d7 black pawn, f7 black pawn, g7 black pawn, h7 black pawn, e6 black pawn, f6 black knight, c4 white pawn, d4 white pawn, g4 white pawn, a2 white pawn, b2 white pawn, e2 white pawn, f2 white pawn, h2 white pawn, a1 white rook, b1 white knight, c1 white bishop, d1 white queen, e1 white king, f1 white bishop, g1 white knight, h1 white rook
- Moves: 1.d4 Nf6 2.c4 e6 3.g4
- ECO: A50
- Parent: Queen's Pawn Game

The Devin Gambit is an offbeat chess opening that begins with the moves:

1. d4 Nf6
2. c4 e6
3. g4!?

In this gambit, White offers a sacrifice of the g-pawn on g4, where it can be captured by Black's knight. In offering the gambit, White plans to play for central control by placing a pawn on e4.

The opening is tricky and may offer practical chances for White in fast chess. The gambit is rare in high-level games, though it was used over-the-board by grandmaster Shakhriyar Mamedyarov in a classical game against Andrey Esipenko during the 2022 Tata Steel Masters tournament in Wijk aan Zee. Since then, the opening has seen more frequent use in blitz chess, though there are multiple responses by Black that result in Black obtaining a good position.

== History ==
The opening was played in 1966 in a game at the Lansing Chess Club. Bill Devin, playing with the white pieces, opened with the gambit in a game that resulted in a twenty-one move checkmate. By August 1971, the gambit had become known in Michigan as the Devin Gambit, and a reader of Chess Life & Review wrote to grandmaster and chess columnist Larry Evans asking if the gambit offered a free pawn or if White gained sufficient compensation for the g-pawn offered in the gambit. Evans evaluated the gambit as being unfavorable for White; per Evans, Black accepting the gambit by taking the pawn with the f6 knight would not to open up the position to White's benefit and would not lead to sufficient attacking chances for White.

The line was played by Shakhriyar Mamedyarov in a game against Andrey Esipenko during the 2022 Tata Steel Masters tournament in Wijk aan Zee. At the time, the use of the line was shocking to observers; the move has rarely been seen at high-level play.

== Variations and analysis ==
Black has multiple responses available on move three that provide Black with comfortable play. However, the aggressive opening may offer practical chances for White, particularly in fast chess; following Mamedyarov's 2022 game against Espineko the Devin Gambit has become more frequently played in blitz chess.

=== 3. ...Bb4+ ===
Position: a8 black rook, b8 black knight, c8 black bishop, d8 black queen, e8 black king, h8 black rook, a7 black pawn, b7 black pawn, c7 black pawn, d7 black pawn, f7 black pawn, g7 black pawn, h7 black pawn, e6 black pawn, f6 black knight, b4 black bishop, c4 white pawn, d4 white pawn, g4 white pawn, a2 white pawn, b2 white pawn, e2 white pawn, f2 white pawn, h2 white pawn, a1 white rook, b1 white knight, c1 white bishop, d1 white queen, e1 white king, f1 white bishop, g1 white knight, h1 white rook

Position after 3... Bb4+

Benjamin Bok, a grandmaster from the Netherlands, argues that 3 ...Bb4+ is the easiest continuation for Black to play. After this reply, White may choose to continue play with 4. Nd2, 4. Nc3, or 4. Bd2.

Against the first option, Bok recommends that Black capture the pawn on g4 on move four. Should White continue with their ordinary plan of pushing the e-pawn and play 5. e4, Bok recommends that Black respond with 5...f5, arguing that White lacks compensation for the sacrificed g-pawn. Against other knight move, which places the piece on c3, Bok recommends that Black respond by pushing the d-pawn with 4 ...d5, arguing that the resulting position will yield Black a slight advantage.

Considering 4. Bd2, Bok recommends that Black capture the bishop on d2 by playing 4...Bxb2+. After 5. Qxd2 Nxg4 6. Nf3 f5, Bok argues that Black has achieved equality by the end of move 6. Should White recapture on d2 with the queen's knight on the fifth move instead of with the queen, Bok argues that 5 ...Nxg4 6. e4 f5 allows Black to maintain a material advantage over White without providing any compensation, writing that after 7. exf5 exf5 8. Qe2+ Qe7, White is simply a clean pawn down.

=== 3. ...Nxg4 ===
Position: a8 black rook, b8 black knight, c8 black bishop, d8 black queen, e8 black king, f8 black bishop, h8 black rook, a7 black pawn, b7 black pawn, c7 black pawn, d7 black pawn, f7 black pawn, g7 black pawn, h7 black pawn, e6 black pawn, c4 white pawn, d4 white pawn, g4 black knight, a2 white pawn, b2 white pawn, e2 white pawn, f2 white pawn, h2 white pawn, a1 white rook, b1 white knight, c1 white bishop, d1 white queen, e1 white king, f1 white bishop, g1 white knight, h1 white rook

Position after 3... Nxg4

Evans briefly argued in 1971 that the Devin Gambit is not favorable for White after 3...Nxg4, stating that accepting the gambit granted White insufficient compensation for the sacrificed pawn. Eric Schiller, writing in his 1998 book Unorthodox Chess Openings, analyzes 3...Nxg4 as better for Black with accurate play. John L. Watson and Schiller, writing jointly in their 2015 book Taming Wild Chess Openings, likewise advocate for immediately accepting White's gambit on move 3.

After 3. ...Nxg4, White aims to play for central control by following up with 4. e4. In Unorthodox Chess Openings, Schiller analyzes a line following White's central pawn push beginning with 4. ...Qh4 5. Nh3 Bb4+ 6. Bd2, recommending that Black play 6. ...Bxd2+. After 7. Qxd2 Nf6, Schiller states that Black has a significant advantage. In Taming Wild Chess Openings, Watson and Schiller also advocate that Black reply with 4... Qh4, but provide the White reply of 5. Qe2. After 5. ...Bb4+ 6. Bd2 Nc6 7. Nf3 Bxd2+ 8. Nbxd2 Qh6 White obtains good piece activity, though it was not clear if the activity provided sufficient compensation for the g-pawn.

Watson and Schiller analyze 4. Nf3 as a fourth-move alternative to the above for White, though conclude that after 4. ...d5 Black will obtain a solid position and White will lack compensation for the gambited pawn.

=== 3. ...d5 ===
Watson and Schiller evaluate 3. ...d5 as a good third-move alternative for Black. After White kicks the knight away with 4. g5 Ne4, Watson and Schiller evaluate the position as being good for Black. This response was Esipenko's choice as Black when faced with the opening at Wijk an Zee.

== Illustrative games ==
=== 3. ...Bb4+ ===
Wei Yi vs Levon Aronian (FTX Road to Miami, 2022)

Position: a8 black rook, b8 black knight, c8 black bishop, d8 black queen, e8 black king, h8 black rook, a7 black pawn, b7 black pawn, c7 black pawn, f7 black pawn, g7 black pawn, h7 black pawn, e6 black pawn, f6 black knight, d5 black pawn, c4 white pawn, d4 white pawn, g4 white pawn, c3 white knight, a2 white pawn, b2 white pawn, d2 white queen, e2 white pawn, f2 white pawn, h2 white pawn, a1 white rook, e1 white king, f1 white bishop, g1 white knight, h1 white rook

Position after 6. Nc3.

Position: a8 black rook, e8 black king, h8 black rook, a7 black pawn, b7 black pawn, c7 black pawn, d7 black bishop, e7 black queen, g7 black pawn, h7 black pawn, b6 black knight, e6 black pawn, f6 black pawn, d5 white pawn, e5 white pawn, g5 white pawn, b4 black knight, c4 black pawn, d4 white queen, h4 white pawn, c3 white knight, f3 white knight, a2 white pawn, b2 white pawn, f2 white pawn, c1 white king, d1 white rook, f1 white bishop, h1 white rook

Position after 14. e5.

Position: b8 black king, d8 black rook, h8 black rook, a7 black pawn, b7 black pawn, d7 black bishop, f7 black queen, g7 black pawn, h7 black pawn, c6 black knight, d6 white pawn, e6 black pawn, f6 black pawn, a5 white pawn, c5 white queen, d5 black knight, g5 white pawn, c4 white bishop, h4 white pawn, c3 white knight, f3 white knight, b2 white pawn, f2 white pawn, c1 white king, d1 white rook, h1 white rook

Position after 20. Bxc4.

Position: b8 black king, c8 black rook, h8 black rook, a7 black pawn, b7 black pawn, g7 black pawn, h7 black pawn, c6 black bishop, d6 white pawn, f6 black pawn, a5 white pawn, d5 white bishop, e5 black pawn, g5 white pawn, b4 white queen, d4 black knight, h4 white pawn, c3 white pawn, d3 white rook, d2 white knight, e2 black queen, f2 white pawn, c1 white king, h1 white rook

Position after 26. ...Bc6. White resigned.

1. d4 Nf6 2. c4 e6 3. g4 Bb4+ 4. Bd2 Bxd2+ 5. Qxd2 d5 6. Nc3 dxc4 7. g5 Nd5 8. h4 Bd7 9. e4 Nb6 10. Nf3 Nc6 11. O-O-O Qe7 12. d5 Nb4 13. Qd4 f6 14. e5 O-O-O 15. d6 cxd6 16. exd6 Qf7 17. Qc5+ Nc6 18. a4 Kb8 19. a5 Nd5 20. Bxc4 Nxc3 21. bxc3 Rc8 22. Bb3 Qh5 23. Rd3 e5 24. Nd2 Nd4 25. Qb4 Qe2 26. Bd5 Bc6 0-1

=== 3. ...Nxg4 ===
Bill Devin vs Zachs (Lansing, 1966):

Position: a8 black rook, b8 black knight, c8 black bishop, e8 black king, f8 black bishop, h8 black rook, a7 black pawn, b7 black pawn, c7 black pawn, d7 black pawn, f7 black pawn, g7 black pawn, h7 black pawn, e6 black pawn, c4 white pawn, d4 white pawn, e4 white pawn, h4 black queen, a2 white pawn, b2 white pawn, e2 white queen, f2 black knight, h2 white pawn, a1 white rook, b1 white knight, c1 white bishop, e1 white king, f1 white bishop, g1 white knight, h1 white rook

Position after 5. ...Nxf2. USCF national master Joel Johnson characterizes Black's sacrifice of 5. ...Nxf2 as a mistake, as after White accepts the sacrifice with 6. Qxf2 black cannot win the h1 rook with 6... Qxe4+ on account of 7. Be2, threatening to trap the queen if her majesty were to grab the rook.

Position: a8 black rook, c8 black bishop, e8 black king, f8 black bishop, h8 black rook, a7 black pawn, b7 black pawn, c7 black pawn, d7 black pawn, f7 black pawn, g7 black pawn, h7 black pawn, e6 black pawn, c4 white pawn, d4 white pawn, e4 black queen, f3 white knight, a2 white pawn, b2 white pawn, c2 black knight, e2 white bishop, f2 white queen, h2 white pawn, a1 white rook, b1 white knight, c1 white bishop, f1 white rook, g1 white king

Position after 9. ...Nxc2. Black will be able to capture White's rook, but White gains a massive attack against the Black king in compensation for the material.

Position: a8 black rook, c8 black bishop, e8 black king, f8 black bishop, h8 black rook, a7 black pawn, b7 black pawn, c7 black pawn, d7 black pawn, e7 black queen, h7 black pawn, e6 black pawn, f6 white bishop, g6 black pawn, e5 white knight, h5 white bishop, c4 white pawn, d4 white pawn, c3 white knight, g3 white queen, a2 white pawn, b2 white pawn, h2 white pawn, a1 black knight, f1 white rook, h1 white king

Position after 16. Bxf6. Despite being up a rook and two pawns, Black's position is completely busted. In the game, mate followed in five moves.

Position: a8 black rook, c8 black bishop, d8 black king, e8 white queen, f8 black bishop, h8 black rook, a7 black pawn, c7 black pawn, d7 black pawn, e7 black queen, b6 black pawn, d6 white knight, e6 black pawn, f6 white bishop, c4 white pawn, d4 white pawn, c3 white knight, a2 white pawn, b2 white pawn, h2 white pawn, a1 black knight, f1 white rook, h1 white king

White checkmates Black with 21. Qe8#.

1. d4 Nf6 2. c4 e6 3. g4 Nxg4 4. e4 Qh4 5. Qe2 Nxf2 6. Qxf2 Qxe4+ 7. Be2 Nc6 8. Nf3 Nb4 9. O-O Nc2 10. Nc3 Qg6+ 11. Kh1 Nxa1 12. Ne5 Qf6 13. Qg3 Qe7 14. Bg5 f6 15. Bh5+ g6 16. Bxf6 b6 17. Bxg6+ hxg6 18. Qxg6+ Kd8 19. Nf7+ Ke8 20. Nd6+ Kd8 21. Qe8# 1-0

=== 3. ...d5 ===
Mamedyarov v Esipenko (Wijk an Zee, 2022):

Position: a8 black rook, b8 black knight, c8 black bishop, d8 black queen, e8 black king, f8 black bishop, h8 black rook, a7 black pawn, b7 black pawn, c7 black pawn, f7 black pawn, g7 black pawn, h7 black pawn, e6 black pawn, d5 black pawn, g5 white pawn, c4 white pawn, d4 white pawn, e4 black knight, a2 white pawn, b2 white pawn, e2 white pawn, f2 white pawn, h2 white pawn, a1 white rook, b1 white knight, c1 white bishop, d1 white queen, e1 white king, f1 white bishop, g1 white knight, h1 white rook

Position after 4. ...Ne4. Esipenko, playing with the black pieces, has declined the gambit, opting for a pawn structure akin to a Queen's Gambit. After White pushes the g-pawn to g5, threatening the Knight, Black brings the knight to e4 on move 4. Black has centralized his Knight, and threatens to bring his bishop to b4 with a check.

Position: a8 black rook, b8 black knight, c8 black bishop, d8 black queen, f8 black rook, g8 black king, a7 black pawn, b7 black pawn, e7 black bishop, f7 black pawn, g7 black pawn, h7 black pawn, c6 black pawn, e6 black pawn, d5 black pawn, g5 white pawn, c4 white pawn, d4 white pawn, e4 black knight, h4 white pawn, h3 white knight, a2 white pawn, b2 white pawn, c2 white queen, e2 white pawn, f2 white pawn, g2 white bishop, a1 white rook, b1 white knight, c1 white bishop, f1 white king, h1 white rook

Position after 9. Qc2. White moves his queen to pressure Black's knight and threatens to take it. USCF National Master Caleb Denby describes this as a mistake, as after 9. ...Nd6, Black's knight applies pressure against White's pawn on c4. If White resolves this pressure by taking Black's d-pawn 10. cxd4 exd4 would allow White natural development of his light-squared bishop. If White does not resolve this pressure himself, then Black will have lasting pressure against White's queenside and tactical complications arise in Black's favor. In the game, however, Esipenko played 10. e5, which Denby describes as an imprecision.

Position: a8 black rook, b8 black knight, d8 black queen, f8 black rook, g8 black king, a7 black pawn, b7 black pawn, e7 black bishop, f7 black pawn, g7 black pawn, h7 black pawn, e6 black bishop, g6 white pawn, d5 black pawn, d4 black pawn, f4 white knight, h4 white pawn, a2 white pawn, b2 white pawn, c2 white queen, d2 white bishop, e2 white pawn, f2 white pawn, g2 white bishop, a1 white rook, f1 white king, h1 white rook

Position after 14. g6. White places his pawn on g6, seeking to sacrifice the pawn in order to open up the enemy king. Black declines the pawn sacrifice with 14. ...Nc6, developing the knight, and allowing Black to follow up with 15. gxh7 Kh8, giving up a pawn while maintaining the safety of his king.

Position: a8 black rook, d8 black queen, f8 black rook, h8 black king, a7 black pawn, b7 black pawn, e7 black bishop, f7 black pawn, g7 black pawn, h7 white pawn, c6 black knight, e6 black bishop, d5 black pawn, d4 black pawn, f4 white knight, h4 white pawn, b3 white queen, a2 white pawn, b2 white pawn, d2 white bishop, e2 white pawn, f2 white pawn, g2 white bishop, a1 white rook, f1 white king, h1 white rook

Position after 16. Qb3. White moves his queen to b3, and Black can gain an advantage after 16. ...Bxh4 and the ensuing tactical complicaitons. In the game, however, Black plays 16. ...Qd7, defending the b7 pawn. After 17. Bxd5 Bxd5 18. Qxd5 Rad8 19. Qxd7 Rxd7 20. Rc1 Kxh7, the game has become a lot drier, and the two grandmasters agreed to a draw six moves later.

Position: a7 black pawn, b7 black pawn, e7 black rook, g7 black pawn, h7 black king, c6 black knight, d6 black bishop, f6 black pawn, d5 black rook, d4 black pawn, h4 white pawn, d3 white knight, f3 white pawn, a2 white pawn, b2 white pawn, e2 white pawn, f2 white bishop, c1 white rook, f1 white king, g1 white rook

Position after 26. ...f6. The game has reached a draw by agreement. Denby characterizes this as having been made early, though chess computers do describe this endgame position as drawn.

1. d4 Nf6 2. c4 e6 3. g4 d5 4. g5 Ne4 5. Bg2 Bb4+ 6. Kf1 Be7 7. h4 O-O 8. Nh3 c6 9. Qc2 e5 10. Nd2 Nxd2+ 11. Bxd2 exd4 12. cxd5 cxd5 13. Nf4 Be6 14. g6 Nc6 15. gxh7+ Kh8 16. Qb3 Qd7 17. Bxd5 Bxd5 18. Qxd5 Rad8 19. Qxd7 Rxd7 20. Rc1 Kxh7 21. Nd3 Rd5 22. Bf4 Re8 23. Bg3 Bd6 24. Rg1 Re4 25. f3 Re7 26. Bf2 f6 1/2-1/2
