= Gavriil Veresov =

Soviet chess master (1912–1979)

Personal information
- Born: Gavriil Nikolayevich Veresov; July 28, 1912 Minsk, Belarus
- Died: November 18, 1979 (aged 67) Minsk, Belarus

Chess career
- Country: Soviet Union
- Title: International Master (1950)

Gavriil Nikolayevich Veresov (Belarusian: Гаўрыла Мікалаевіч Верасаў, Russian: Гавриил Николаевич Вересов; 28 July 1912 – 18 November 1979) was a Soviet chess player. He was awarded the title of International Master (IM) in 1950.

== Biography ==
Veresov was born in Minsk to a journalist father and his mother, he graduated from high school in 1929, after high school, Veresov temporarily worked as a fitter, in 1933 he entered Belarusian State University, from which he graduated from in 1939.

Veresov was a six-time winner of the Belarusian Chess Championship (1936, 1939, 1941, 1958, 1963; in 1956 – ex æquo with Boris Goldenov). Veresov came to the forefront of Soviet chess during the Second World War. The Chessmetrics website, which assigns retroactive ratings to older players, ranks him as 21st in the world in 1945. He was an aggressive player and notable public figure (inter alia, headed the Soviet chess delegation in Groningen, 1946), but is mostly recognized today for the opening that bears his name – The Veresov Opening. Veresov was born and died in Minsk. In later life, he held a number of senior government posts in Belorussia.

== The Veresov Opening ==
The Veresov Opening (also known as the Richter–Veresov Attack after International Master Kurt Richter) begins either 1. d4 Nf6 2. Nc3 d5 3. Bg5 or, more commonly, 1. d4 d5 2. Nc3 Nf6 3. Bg5. After 3.Bg5, Black's most popular choices are 3... Nbd7, 3... e6, 3... Bf5, 3... c6 and 3... c5, all potentially leading to different variations, with 3...e6 4. e4 giving a French Defence by transposition. White's plans typically include rapid Queenside castling, and an early f2-f3 and e2-e4 pawn push. The ECO code for the Richter–Veresov Attack is D01.
