= Mark Hebden =

English chess grandmaster (born 1958)

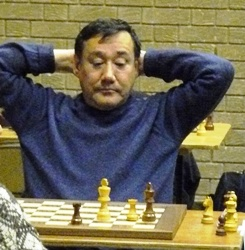
- Mark Hebden at the 2007 British Rapidplay Championship

Personal information
- Born: Mark Lesland Hebden; 15 February 1958 (age 68) Leicester, England

Chess career
- Country: England
- Title: Grandmaster (1992)
- Peak rating: 2567 (October 2001)
- Peak ranking: No. 88 (July 1983)

Mark Lesland Hebden (born 15 February 1958 in Leicester) is an English chess player who holds the title Grandmaster.

Hebden is known for chess openings such as the Grand Prix Attack, the Barry Attack, and the 150 Attack.

Hebden was British Rapidplay Chess Champion in 1990, 1994, 2001, 2005, 2009, 2013 and 2015 .

He played for England in the European Team Chess Championships of 1983, 1989 and 2007.

He was equal first in four editions of the very strong Cappelle-la-Grande Open: 1989, 1990, 1995 and 1997.

In 2001 he tied for 1st-4th with Yannick Pelletier, Tamaz Gelashvili and Vladimir Tukmakov in the 9th Neuchâtel Open and in 2009–10 tied for 1st-4th with Andrei Istrățescu, Romain Edouard and David Howell in the Hastings International Chess Congress.

Hebden is a regular participant at the 4NCL, Britain's premier chess league and in 2013, won the 4NCL Individual Championship, held at Daventry. He also plays in local leagues for Sutton Coldfield Chess Club, Syston Chess Club, and online on Internet Chess Club ICC as 'mhebden'. ICC is a commercial site where many titled players gather.
