= Carlos Torre Repetto =

Mexican chess grandmaster (1904–1978)

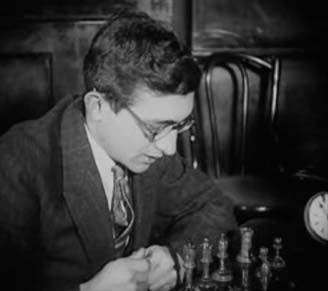
- Torre at the Moscow 1925 tournament

Personal information
- Born: Carlos Jesús Torre Repetto; 29 November 1904 Mérida, Yucatán
- Died: 19 March 1978 (aged 73) Mérida, Yucatán

Chess career
- Country: Mexico
- Title: Grandmaster (1977)

Carlos Jesús Torre Repetto (29 November 1904 (Note: Hooper/Whyld, Gaige say 1905.) – 19 March 1978) was a Mexican chess player and the first from his country to be awarded the title of grandmaster, which was accorded by FIDE in 1977.

== Biography ==
Born in Mérida, Yucatán, Torre spent much of his early life in New Orleans, US and developed as a young player under the tutelage of the New Orleans player Edwin Ziegler Adams. Torre later published an extraordinary combination that was supposed to have occurred in a game Adams–Torre and featured White's victory. It was determined subsequently that this combination was never played in a game; Torre's attribution of it to Adams was an homage to his teacher.

Torre first came to international attention when he attended the great New York 1924 tournament and impressed both the American and European masters with the high quality of his speed chess and analytical ability. The website Chessmetrics.com places Torre as eighth in the world following his tour of Europe. He was awarded the Grandmaster title in 1977.

Torre's career was cut short by mental illness. Torre spent much if not the remainder of his life hospitalized following his breakdown in 1926. A coming marriage that was broken by a Dear John letter is believed to have played a role in his breakdown, according to The Oxford Companion to Chess. Chess historian Edward Winter, however, regards this as an open question. Reuben Fine visited him many years later and found that he still played very well. (Note: The game is included in Fine's book Lessons From My Games (1958), along with some comments on Torre's demeanor and condition.)

== Major tournament results ==
Torre won the Louisiana state championship at New Orleans 1923, and began to reach world prominence in 1924. He was first at Detroit 1924 (25th Western Open), followed by Samuel Factor, Herman H. Hahlbohm, Norman Whitaker, Samuel Reshevsky, etc. He won at Rochester, New York 1924 (with Jennings). In 1924, Torre took third place in New York (Abraham Kupchik won).

In 1925, he made his European debut, in events with much stronger and deeper fields of more experienced masters. Torre took tenth place in Baden-Baden (Alexander Alekhine won). In 1925, he tied for third-fourth places with Frank Marshall, behind Aron Nimzowitsch and Akiba Rubinstein, in Marienbad. In 1925, he tied for fifth-sixth with Savielly Tartakower in Moscow (Efim Bogoljubow won), tied for second-third in Leningrad (quadrangular; Solomon Gotthilf won). In 1926, he tied for second-third places with Géza Maróczy, behind Marshall, in Chicago. In 1926, he won, ahead of José Joaquín Araiza, in Mexico City.

== Legacy ==
The chess opening Torre Attack is named after him. It is characterized by the moves: 1.d4 Nf6 2.Nf3 e6 3.Bg5. Torre also introduced the Mexican Defence to chess theory in a match against Fritz Sämisch in 1925 in Baden-Baden, Germany. It runs: 1.d4 Nf6 2.c4 Nc6.

A memorial tournament in his honour has been held annually since 1987 in his native city.

=== "The Windmill" ===
Torre vs. Lasker, Moscow 1925

Position: a8 black rook, e8 black rook, f8 black knight, g8 black king, a7 black pawn, b7 black bishop, f7 black pawn, g7 black pawn, d6 black pawn, e6 black pawn, h6 black pawn, b5 black queen, g5 white bishop, h5 white queen, b4 white pawn, d4 white pawn, e3 white knight, g3 white rook, a2 white pawn, f2 white pawn, g2 white pawn, h2 white pawn, e1 white rook, g1 white king

Position after 24...Qb5

In the Moscow 1925 chess tournament, Torre defeated former world champion Emanuel Lasker with a queen sacrifice. The famous sequence is known as "The Windmill":

Torre vs. E. Lasker
1.d4 Nf6 2.Nf3 e6 3.Bg5 c5 4.e3 cxd4 5.exd4 Be7 6.Nbd2 d6 7.c3 Nbd7 8.Bd3 b6 9.Nc4 Bb7 10.Qe2 Qc7 11.0-0 0-0 12.Rfe1 Rfe8 13.Rad1 Nf8 14.Bc1 Nd5 15.Ng5 b5 16.Na3 b4 17.cxb4 Nxb4 18.Qh5 Bxg5 19.Bxg5 Nxd3 20.Rxd3 Qa5 21.b4! Qf5 22.Rg3 h6 23.Nc4 Qd5 24.Ne3 Qb5 (diagram)

Torre wins with a queen sacrifice, as his rook and bishop form a grindstone that crushes Black with a series of checks and discovered checks.

25.Bf6!! Qxh5 26.Rxg7+ Kh8 27.Rxf7+ Kg8 28.Rg7+ Kh8 29.Rxb7+ Kg8 30.Rg7+ Kh8 31.Rg5+ Kh7 32.Rxh5 Kg6 33.Rh3 Kxf6 34.Rxh6+ Kg5 35.Rh3 Reb8 36.Rg3+ Kf6 37.Rf3+ Kg6 38.a3 a5 39.bxa5 Rxa5 40.Nc4 Rd5 41.Rf4 Nd7 42.Rxe6+ Kg5 43.g3 1–0
