= Torre Attack =

Chess opening

Position: a8 black rook, b8 black knight, c8 black bishop, d8 black queen, e8 black king, f8 black bishop, h8 black rook, a7 black pawn, b7 black pawn, c7 black pawn, d7 black pawn, f7 black pawn, g7 black pawn, h7 black pawn, e6 black pawn, f6 black knight, g5 white bishop, d4 white pawn, f3 white knight, a2 white pawn, b2 white pawn, c2 white pawn, e2 white pawn, f2 white pawn, g2 white pawn, h2 white pawn, a1 white rook, b1 white knight, d1 white queen, e1 white king, f1 white bishop, h1 white rook
- Moves: 1.d4 Nf6 2.Nf3 ... 3.Bg5
- ECO: A46–48, D03
- Origin: 1920s
- Named after: Carlos Torre

The Torre Attack is a chess opening characterized by the moves:

1. d4 Nf6
2. Nf3 e6
3. Bg5 (ECO code A46)

or the Tartakower Variation in the Queen's Pawn Game (ECO code D03):

2... d5
3. Bg5

or the Torre Attack in the East Indian Defence (ECO code A48):

2... g6
3. Bg5

or the Torre Attack in the Indian Defence (ECO code A47):

2... b6
3. Bg5

== Description ==
A common position for White's opening attack on Black's kingside will be with the light-squared bishop at d3 and the dark-squared bishop at g5, and the knights at d2 and f3:

Position: f6 black knight, g5 white bishop, d4 white pawn, d3 white bishop, e3 white pawn, f3 white knight, a2 white pawn, b2 white pawn, c2 white pawn, d2 white knight, f2 white pawn, g2 white pawn, h2 white pawn, a1 white rook, d1 white queen, e1 white king, h1 white rook

Torre Attack: ready to go

Position: f6 black knight, g5 white bishop, d4 white pawn, e4 white pawn, c3 white pawn, d3 white bishop, f3 white knight, a2 white pawn, b2 white pawn, d2 white knight, f2 white pawn, g2 white pawn, h2 white pawn, a1 white rook, d1 white queen, e1 white king, h1 white rook

White's Torre structure with c3 and e4

White pursues quick and harmonious development, will bolster his d4-pawn by c2–c3, then often enforces e2–e4 to obtain attacking chances on the kingside as the Torre bishop pins the f6-knight. If White plays an early c4, the opening will transpose to a number of more common queen pawn openings, such as the Queen's Gambit or one of the various Indian defences.

The opening is named after the Mexican grandmaster Carlos Torre Repetto, who beat former World Champion Emanuel Lasker with it. The variation was also employed by Savielly Tartakower, Boris Spassky, and Tigran Petrosian early in his career. Other noted top-level exponents include Alexey Dreev, Pentala Harikrishna, Krishnan Sasikiran and Jan Timman.

The Torre Attack is rarely met in modern top-flight play as a "Go-to or Primary" system, and statistics suggest that it is not particularly advantageous for White. Due to its calm nature and relative lack of theory, however, it is popular at club level, giving White chances to seize a middlegame initiative. In recent years it has also been used against Black's kingside fianchetto pawn structure.

== Torre Attack in the East Indian Defence (ECO A48) ==
A variation of East Indian Defence, after 1.d4 Nf6 2.Nf3 g6 3.Bg5, is often also called Torre Attack. After 3...Bg7, White usually plays 4.Nbd2 but can also play 4.c3. After 4.Nbd2, common lines include 4...0-0 5.c3 and 4...d5 5.e3 0-0.

=== Example game ===
Loek Van Wely vs. Peter Leko, 1996
1.d4 Nf6 2.Nf3 g6 3.Bg5 Bg7 4.Nbd2 0-0 5.c3 d6 6.e4 c5 7.dxc5 dxc5 8.Bc4 Nc6 9.0-0 Qc7 10.Qe2 h6 11.Bh4 Nh5 12.Rfe1 Ne5 13.Nxe5 Bxe5 14.g3 Bh8 15.f4 Ng7 16.Qf3 Be6 17.Rad1 Rad8 18.Bxe6 Nxe6 19.f5 g5 20.fxe6 gxh4 21.Qg4 Bg7 22.Qxh4 c4 23.Kg2 fxe6 24.Qg4 Rf6 25.Nf3 Rdf8 26.Nd4 h5 27.Qxh5 Rf2 28.Kh3 Qe5 29.Qxe5 Bxe5 30.Nxe6 R8f6 31.Rd8 Kf7 32.Ng5 Kg7 33.Rd7 Rh6 34.Kg4 Bf6 35.Ne6 Kf7 36.Nf4 Rh8 37.h4 Rg8 38.Kh3 Be5 39.Rd5 Bxf4 40.Rf5 Ke6 41.Rxf4 Rxb2 42.h5 b5 43.Rg4 Rxg4 44.Kxg4 Rxa2 45.h6 Rh2 46.Kg5 Ke5 47.g4 a5 48.Rb1 Kxe4 49.Rxb5 a4 50.Ra5 Kd3 51.Kg6 a3 52.h7 e5 53.Rxe5 Rxh7 54.Kxh7 Kxc3 55.Ra5 Kb2 56.g5 a2 57.g6 a1=Q 58.Rxa1 Kxa1 59.g7 c3 60.g8=Q c2 ½–½

== See also ==
- Trompowsky Attack · another set of openings with White utilizing d4 and Bg5 attacking Black's Nf6, which may sometimes transpose to a Torre Attack
- List of chess openings
- List of chess openings named after people
