= Grünfeld Defence =

Position: a8 black rook, b8 black knight, c8 black bishop, d8 black queen, e8 black king, f8 black bishop, h8 black rook, a7 black pawn, b7 black pawn, c7 black pawn, e7 black pawn, f7 black pawn, h7 black pawn, f6 black knight, g6 black pawn, d5 black pawn, c4 white pawn, d4 white pawn, c3 white knight, a2 white pawn, b2 white pawn, e2 white pawn, f2 white pawn, g2 white pawn, h2 white pawn, a1 white rook, c1 white bishop, d1 white queen, e1 white king, f1 white bishop, g1 white knight, h1 white rook
- Moves: 1.d4 Nf6 2.c4 g6 3.Nc3 d5
- ECO: D80–D99
- Origin: Bad Pistyan, Piešťany, 1922
- Named after: Ernst Grünfeld
- Parent: King's Indian Defence

The Grünfeld Defence is a chess opening characterised by the moves:

1. d4 Nf6
2. c4 g6
3. Nc3 d5

Black offers White the possibility of 4.cxd5, which may be followed by 4...Nxd5 and 5.e4, giving White an imposing central pawn duo. If White does not take the d5-pawn, Black may eventually play ...dxc4, when a White response of e4 again leads to the same pawn structure. In classical opening theory this imposing pawn centre was held to give White a large advantage, but the hypermodern school, which was coming to the fore in the 1920s, held that a large pawn centre could be a liability rather than an asset. The Grünfeld is therefore a key hypermodern opening, showing in stark terms how a large pawn centre can either be a powerful battering ram or a target for attack.

== History ==
The first instance of this opening is in an 1855 game by Moheschunder Bannerjee, an Indian player who had transitioned from Indian chess rules, playing Black against John Cochrane in Calcutta, in May 1855:

1.d4 Nf6 2.c4 g6 3.Nc3 d5 4.e3 Bg7 5.Nf3 0-0 6.cxd5 Nxd5 7.Be2 Nxc3 8.bxc3 c5 9.0-0 cxd4 10.cxd4 Nc6 11.Bb2 Bg4 12.Rc1 Rc8 13.Ba3 Qa5 14.Qb3 Rfe8 15.Rc5 Qb6 16.Rb5 Qd8 17.Ng5 Bxe2 18.Nxf7 Na5

and White mates in three (19.Nh6+ double check Kh8 20.Qg8+ Rxg8 21.Nf7#). Cochrane published a book reporting his games with Moheshchunder and other Indians in 1864.

It gained popularity after Ernst Grünfeld introduced it into international play at the Bad Pistyan Tournament 7–28 April 1922, where, in his first game with the defense, he drew Friedrich Sämisch in 22 moves. Later the same year on November 18, 1922, Ernst Grünfeld defeated future world champion Alexander Alekhine in Vienna in 55 moves. Grünfeld usually employed a very classical style. The defence was later adopted by a number of prominent players, including Vasily Smyslov, Viktor Korchnoi, Leonid Stein and Bobby Fischer. Garry Kasparov often used the defence, including in his World Championship matches against Anatoly Karpov in 1986, 1987 and 1990, and Vladimir Kramnik in 2000.

Notable 21st-century players who have employed the opening include Magnus Carlsen, Maxime Vachier-Lagrave, Loek van Wely, Peter Svidler, Peter Leko, Viswanathan Anand, Luke McShane, Ian Nepomniachtchi and Gata Kamsky. Anand employed it twice in the World Chess Championship 2010. In the World Chess Championship 2012 between Anand and Boris Gelfand, each player used the Grünfeld once with both games ending in draws. Anand faced the Grünfeld against Magnus Carlsen during the first game of the World Chess Championship 2014 and drew in a Rook and Queen ending.

The Game of the Century between Donald Byrne and 13-year-old Bobby Fischer on October 17, 1956, featured this opening, although arriving in the Grünfeld via a transposition of moves (using 1.Nf3 Nf6 2.c4 g6 3.Nc3 Bg7 4.d4 0-0 5.Bf4 d5).

== Exchange Variation: 4.cxd5 Nxd5 ==
Position: a8 black rook, b8 black knight, c8 black bishop, d8 black queen, e8 black king, f8 black bishop, h8 black rook, a7 black pawn, b7 black pawn, c7 black pawn, e7 black pawn, f7 black pawn, h7 black pawn, g6 black pawn, d5 black knight, d4 white pawn, c3 white knight, a2 white pawn, b2 white pawn, e2 white pawn, f2 white pawn, g2 white pawn, h2 white pawn, a1 white rook, c1 white bishop, d1 white queen, e1 white king, f1 white bishop, g1 white knight, h1 white rook

Exchange Variation

The Exchange Variation (ECO codes D85–D89) is defined by the continuation 4.cxd5 Nxd5, which is the most frequent continuation to the Grünfeld. After the most common move 5.e4, which kicks Black's knight, White has an imposing looking centre, and the main continuation 5...Nxc3 6.bxc3 strengthens it still further. Besides 5.e4, White can also try 5.Bd2, 5.Na4, and others.

=== Main line: 5.e4 Nxc3 6.bxc3 ===
Position: a8 black rook, b8 black knight, c8 black bishop, d8 black queen, e8 black king, f8 black bishop, h8 black rook, a7 black pawn, b7 black pawn, c7 black pawn, e7 black pawn, f7 black pawn, h7 black pawn, g6 black pawn, d4 white pawn, e4 white pawn, c3 white pawn, a2 white pawn, f2 white pawn, g2 white pawn, h2 white pawn, a1 white rook, c1 white bishop, d1 white queen, e1 white king, f1 white bishop, g1 white knight, h1 white rook

After 5.e4 Nxc3 6.bxc3

After 5.e4 Nxc3 6.bxc3, Black generally attacks White's centre with ...c5 and ...Bg7, often followed by moves such as ...Qa5, ...cxd4, ...Bg4 and ...Nc6. White often uses the big centre to launch an attack against Black's king. One subvariation, frequently played by Karpov, including four games of his 1987 world championship match against Kasparov in Seville, Spain, is the Seville Variation, after 6...Bg7 7.Bc4 c5 8.Ne2 Nc6 9.Be3 0-0 10.0-0 Bg4 11.f3 Na5 12.Bxf7+, long thought a poor move by theory, as the resultant dark-square weakness had been believed to give Black more than enough compensation for the pawn.

White can develop in a number of ways in the main line. For decades, theory held that the correct method of development was with Bc4 and Ne2, often followed by 0-0 and f4–f5, playing for a central breakthrough or kingside attack. It was generally thought that an early Nf3 was weak in the Exchange Variation because it allowed Black too much pressure on the centre with ...Bg4. In the late 1970s, however, Karpov, Kasparov and others found different methods to play the Exchange Variation with White, often involving an early Rb1 to remove the rook from the sensitive a1–h8 diagonal, as well as attempting to hinder the development of Black's queenside. Another, relatively recently developed system involves quickly playing Be3, Qd2 and Rc1 or Rd1 to fortify White's centre, remove White's rook from the diagonal and possibly enable an early d5 push by White.

Vladimir Kramnik (as White) won game 2 of the Classical World Chess Championship 2000 against Garry Kasparov, who had been a well-known Grünfeld practitioner as Black, after uncorking a new idea for White in the main line. Kramnik discovered the idea during training with Boris Gelfand a year before the match. Kasparov abandoned the Grünfeld for the remainder of his career after the match.

=== Nadanian Variation: 5.Na4 ===
Position: a8 black rook, b8 black knight, c8 black bishop, d8 black queen, e8 black king, f8 black bishop, h8 black rook, a7 black pawn, b7 black pawn, c7 black pawn, e7 black pawn, f7 black pawn, h7 black pawn, g6 black pawn, d5 black knight, a4 white knight, d4 white pawn, a2 white pawn, b2 white pawn, e2 white pawn, f2 white pawn, g2 white pawn, h2 white pawn, a1 white rook, c1 white bishop, d1 white queen, e1 white king, f1 white bishop, g1 white knight, h1 white rook

Nadanian Variation

5.Na4 (ECO D85), known as the Nadanian Variation or Nadanian Attack, is named after Ashot Nadanian, who first employed it in 1996. His analysis was published in the 67th volume of Chess Informant and caused major ripples in the chess world. (Note: Jonathan Rowson wrote that Nadanian "should be congratulated for seeing what everyone has seen, and thinking what nobody had thought". The New in Chess Yearbook printed on the cover of the 45th volume "A Revolution in the Gruenfeld: 5.Na4!?!".)

White's fifth move controls the key square c5 and discourages Black from playing c7–c5. The idea breaks two opening principles: avoid moving the same piece twice, and avoid placing a knight on the edge of the board. (Note: Igor Zaitsev wrote that "it is unusual among the unusual. A voluntary removal of the knight from the centre, yet that has gone on advantage? Therefore, the value of such centrifugal maneuver is beyond a simple theoretical novelty, in a certain measure it is a challenge to chess foundations, an attempt to grope new properties in two-dimensional chess space.") However, according to Nadanian, 5.Na4 warrants an exception because the intended next move 6.e4 wins a tempo back, as Black too will have to move an already developed piece (the knight on d5) a second time.

The main line continues 5...Bg7 6.e4 Nb6 (Avrukh's 6...Nb4 is also interesting) 7.Be3 0-0 8.Nf3 Bg4 (instead 8...Nxa4 9.Qxa4 c5 10.Rd1 Qb6 11.Rd2 was good for White in Korchnoi–Sutovsky, Dresden 1998) 9.Be2 Nc6 10.d5 Ne5 11.Nxe5 Bxe2 12.Qxe2 Nxa4 with approximately equal chances. Another possible line is 5...e5 6.dxe5 Nc6, suggested by Igor Zaitsev and first played by Mikhalchishin. After 7.a3 (Nadanian's idea) 7...Bf5 8.Nf3 Qd7 9.e3 0-0-0 10.Be2 (Eingorn gives 10.Bb5 Qe6) 10...Qe7 11.Qb3 Bg7, according to Yelena Dembo, Black has a powerful initiative.

There are also modified versions of Nadanian's idea, such as 4.Nf3 Bg7 5.cxd5 Nxd5 6.Na4, which has been called the Improved Nadanian and the Deferred Nadanian, and 4.f3 c5 5.cxd5 Nxd5 6.Na4, which has been called the Neo-Nadanian.

=== Other lines ===
- 5.Bd2 is the most frequent alternative to 5.e4. It intends 6.e4 Nxc3 7.Bxc3, preventing White from being inflicted with an isolated pawn. Black may opt to play 6...Nb6 instead of trading off the knight.
- 5.g3 prepares to fianchetto.
- 5.Nf3 usually transposes to another line.

== Russian System: 4.Nf3 Bg7 5.Qb3 ==
Position: a8 black rook, b8 black knight, c8 black bishop, d8 black queen, e8 black king, h8 black rook, a7 black pawn, b7 black pawn, c7 black pawn, e7 black pawn, f7 black pawn, g7 black bishop, h7 black pawn, f6 black knight, g6 black pawn, d5 black pawn, c4 white pawn, d4 white pawn, b3 white queen, c3 white knight, f3 white knight, a2 white pawn, b2 white pawn, e2 white pawn, f2 white pawn, g2 white pawn, h2 white pawn, a1 white rook, c1 white bishop, e1 white king, f1 white bishop, h1 white rook

Russian System 5.Qb3

In bringing more pressure to bear against Black's central outpost on d5, White practically forces ...dxc4, thus gaining a central preponderance; however, in return, their queen will often be exposed as Black's queenside play unfolds in the middlegame. After 5...dxc4 6.Qxc4 0-0 7.e4 Black has several primary options:

=== Hungarian Variation: 7...a6 ===
The Hungarian Variation, 7...a6, has been championed by Peter Leko.

=== Smyslov Variation: 7...Bg4 8.Be3 Nfd7 ===
Named after Vasily Smyslov, 7...Bg4 8.Be3 Nfd7 was a topical line from the 1950s through the mid-1970s.

=== Prins Variation: 7...Na6 ===
7...Na6 is Lodewijk Prins's idea, which Kasparov favoured in several of his World Championship matches against Karpov.

=== Byrne Variation: 7...Nc6 ===
This line is commonly seen in recent games. After 7...Nc6, White will most commonly play 8.Be2, followed by 8...e5! 9.d5 Nd4 10.Nxd4 exd4 11.Qxd4. A pawn sacrifice to develop Black's pieces and generate active counterplay.

=== Other lines ===
- 7...c6
- 7...b6

== Taimanov Variation (aka Petrosian Variation): 4.Nf3 Bg7 5.Bg5 ==
Position: a8 black rook, b8 black knight, c8 black bishop, d8 black queen, e8 black king, h8 black rook, a7 black pawn, b7 black pawn, c7 black pawn, e7 black pawn, f7 black pawn, g7 black bishop, h7 black pawn, f6 black knight, g6 black pawn, d5 black pawn, g5 white bishop, c4 white pawn, d4 white pawn, c3 white knight, f3 white knight, a2 white pawn, b2 white pawn, e2 white pawn, f2 white pawn, g2 white pawn, h2 white pawn, a1 white rook, d1 white queen, e1 white king, f1 white bishop, h1 white rook

Taimanov Variation 4.Nf3 Bg7 5.Bg5

In this line, favoured by Yasser Seirawan, after the nearly universal 5...Ne4, White plays 6.Bh4 or 6.cxd5, with Black then opting for either 6...Nxc3 7.bxc3 dxc4 or 6...Nxg5 7.Nxg5 e6. In the latter case, 7...c6 is sometimes tried. 6.Nxd5? grabbing the pawn loses a piece after 6...Nxg5 7.Nxg5 e6. After 6.cxd5 Nxg5 7.Nxg5 e6, White has 8.Qd2 exd5 9.Qe3+, with attacking chances (though the interpolation 8...h6 9.Nf3 exd5 is a significant alternative), or the more usual 8.Nf3 exd5 after which play generally proceeds on lines analogous to the Queen's Gambit Declined, Exchange Variation, with a queenside minority attack by White (b2–b4–b5xc6), as Black aims for their traditional kingside play with f7–f5–f4 and, in this case, g6–g5.

== Lines with 4.Bf4 and the Grünfeld Gambit ==
Position: a8 black rook, b8 black knight, c8 black bishop, d8 black queen, e8 black king, f8 black bishop, h8 black rook, a7 black pawn, b7 black pawn, c7 black pawn, e7 black pawn, f7 black pawn, h7 black pawn, f6 black knight, g6 black pawn, d5 black pawn, c4 white pawn, d4 white pawn, f4 white bishop, c3 white knight, a2 white pawn, b2 white pawn, e2 white pawn, f2 white pawn, g2 white pawn, h2 white pawn, a1 white rook, d1 white queen, e1 white king, f1 white bishop, g1 white knight, h1 white rook

4.Bf4

For players who do not wish to take on the complexities of the Exchange Variation, the move 4.Bf4 is generally considered a safer continuation for White. White opts for the initiative on the queenside with a smaller pawn centre. In the main line (D82), play proceeds with 4...Bg7 5.e3 c5 6.dxc5 Qa5, with White's choices at their seventh move being cxd5, Qb3, Qa4, or Rc1. Despite its reputation, in statistical databases this variation shows only a slightly higher percentage of White wins and draws, as opposed to the Exchange Variation. The variation is not often met in top-flight play today, its usage having declined significantly since its heyday in the 1930s.

Position: a8 black rook, b8 black knight, c8 black bishop, d8 black queen, f8 black rook, g8 black king, a7 black pawn, b7 black pawn, c7 black pawn, e7 black pawn, f7 black pawn, g7 black bishop, h7 black pawn, f6 black knight, g6 black pawn, d5 black pawn, c4 white pawn, d4 white pawn, f4 white bishop, c3 white knight, e3 white pawn, a2 white pawn, b2 white pawn, f2 white pawn, g2 white pawn, h2 white pawn, a1 white rook, d1 white queen, e1 white king, f1 white bishop, g1 white knight, h1 white rook

Grünfeld Gambit

In this variation, play may also continue 4.Bf4 Bg7 5.e3 0-0, which is known as the Grünfeld Gambit (ECO code D83). White can accept the gambit by playing 6.cxd5 Nxd5 7.Nxd5 Qxd5 8.Bxc7, or decline it with 6.Qb3 or 6.Rc1, to which Black responds with 6...c5.

== Neo-Grünfeld Defence ==
Position: a8 black rook, b8 black knight, c8 black bishop, d8 black queen, e8 black king, f8 black bishop, h8 black rook, a7 black pawn, b7 black pawn, c7 black pawn, e7 black pawn, f7 black pawn, h7 black pawn, f6 black knight, g6 black pawn, d5 black pawn, c4 white pawn, d4 white pawn, g3 white pawn, a2 white pawn, b2 white pawn, e2 white pawn, f2 white pawn, h2 white pawn, a1 white rook, b1 white knight, c1 white bishop, d1 white queen, e1 white king, f1 white bishop, g1 white knight, h1 white rook

Neo-Grünfeld Defence

Systems in which White delays the development Nc3 are known as the Neo-Grünfeld Defence (ECO code D70–D79); typical move orders are 1.d4 Nf6 2.g3 g6 3.c4 d5 or, more commonly, 1.d4 Nf6 2.c4 g6 3.g3 d5 (the latter is known as the Kemeri Variation).

The Encyclopaedia of Chess Openings classifies the Neo-Grünfeld under codes D70 to D79 according to the below scheme.

- D70: 1.d4 Nf6 2.c4 g6 with 3...d5
- D71: 1.d4 Nf6 2.c4 g6 3.g3 d5
- D72: 1.d4 Nf6 2.c4 g6 3.g3 d5 4.Bg2 Bg7 5.cxd5 Nxd5 6.e4
- D73: 1.d4 Nf6 2.c4 g6 3.g3 d5 4.Bg2 Bg7 5.Nf3
- D74: 1.d4 Nf6 2.c4 g6 3.g3 d5 4.Bg2 Bg7 5.Nf3 0-0
- D75: 1.d4 Nf6 2.c4 g6 3.g3 d5 4.Bg2 Bg7 5.Nf3 0-0 6.cxd5 Nxd5 7.0-0 c5
- D76: 1.d4 Nf6 2.c4 g6 3.g3 d5 4.Bg2 Bg7 5.Nf3 0-0 6.cxd5 Nxd5 7.0-0 Nb6
- D77: 1.d4 Nf6 2.c4 g6 3.g3 d5 4.Bg2 Bg7 5.Nf3 0-0 6.0-0
- D78: 1.d4 Nf6 2.c4 g6 3.g3 d5 4.Bg2 Bg7 5.Nf3 0-0 6.0-0 c6
- D79: 1.d4 Nf6 2.c4 g6 3.g3 d5 4.Bg2 Bg7 5.Nf3 0-0 6.0-0 c6 7.cxd5

== Other variations ==
Apart from the above, other frequent continuations include:

- 4.Qb3 (Accelerated Russian System) (ECO D81)
- 4.Nf3 Bg7 5.Qa4+ (Flohr Variation) (ECO D90)
- 4.Nf3 Bg7 5.e3 (Quiet System or Slow System) (ECO D94)

== Notable games ==
Donald Byrne vs. Bobby Fischer, Third Rosenwald Trophy (1956), New York, NY USA, rd 8, Oct-17. "The Game of the Century"
Gruenfeld Defense: Three Knights Variation. Hungarian Attack (D92)
1.Nf3 Nf6 2.c4 g6 3.Nc3 Bg7 4.d4 O-O 5.Bf4 d5 6.Qb3 dxc4 7.Qxc4 c6 8.e4 Nbd7 9.Rd1 Nb6 10.Qc5 Bg4 11.Bg5 Na4 12.Qa3 Nxc3 13.bxc3 Nxe4 14.Bxe7 Qb6 15.Bc4 Nxc3 16. Bc5 Rfe8+ 17.Kf1 Be6 18.Bxb6 Bxc4+ 19.Kg1 Ne2+ 20.Kf1 Nxd4+ 21.Kg1 Ne2+ 22.Kf1 Nc3+ 23.Kg1 axb6 24. Qb4 Ra4 25.Qxb6 Nxd1 26.h3 Rxa2 27.Kh2 Nxf2 28.Re1 Rxe1 29.Qd8+ Bf8 30.Nxe1 Bd5 31.Nf3 Ne4 32. Qb8 b5 33. h4 h5 34. Ne5 Kg7 35.Kg1 Bc5+ 36.Kf1 Ng3+ 37.Ke1 Bb4+ 38.Kd1 Bb3+ 39.Kc1 Ne2+ 40.Kb1 Nc3+ 41.Kc1 Rc2# 0–1

== ECO Codes ==
The Encyclopaedia of Chess Openings classifies the Grünfeld under codes D80 to D99 according to the below scheme.

- D80: 1.d4 Nf6 2.c4 g6 3.Nc3 d5
- D81: 1.d4 Nf6 2.c4 g6 3.Nc3 d5 4.Qb3
- D82: 1.d4 Nf6 2.c4 g6 3.Nc3 d5 4.Bf4
- D83: 1.d4 Nf6 2.c4 g6 3.Nc3 d5 4.Bf4 Bg7 5.e3 0-0
- D84: 1.d4 Nf6 2.c4 g6 3.Nc3 d5 4.Bf4 Bg7 5.e3 0-0 6.cxd5
- D85: 1.d4 Nf6 2.c4 g6 3.Nc3 d5 4.cxd5
- D86: 1.d4 Nf6 2.c4 g6 3.Nc3 d5 4.cxd5 Nxd5 5.e4 Nxc3 6.bxc3 Bg7 7.Bc4
- D87: 1.d4 Nf6 2.c4 g6 3.Nc3 d5 4.cxd5 Nxd5 5.e4 Nxc3 6.bxc3 Bg7 7.Bc4 0-0 8.Ne2 c5
- D88: 1.d4 Nf6 2.c4 g6 3.Nc3 d5 4.cxd5 Nxd5 5.e4 Nxc3 6.bxc3 Bg7 7.Bc4 0-0 8.Ne2 c5 9.0-0 Nc6 10.Be3 cxd4
- D89: 1.d4 Nf6 2.c4 g6 3.Nc3 d5 4.cxd5 Nxd5 5.e4 Nxc3 6.bxc3 Bg7 7.Bc4 0-0 8.Ne2 c5 9.0-0 Nc6 10.Be3 cxd4 11.cxd4 Bg4 12.f3 Na5 13.Bd3
- D90: 1.d4 Nf6 2.c4 g6 3.Nc3 d5 4.Nf3
- D91: 1.d4 Nf6 2.c4 g6 3.Nc3 d5 4.Nf3 Bg7 5.Bg5
- D92: 1.d4 Nf6 2.c4 g6 3.Nc3 d5 4.Nf3 Bg7 5.Bf4
- D93: 1.d4 Nf6 2.c4 g6 3.Nc3 d5 4.Nf3 Bg7 5.Bf4 0-0 6.e3
- D94: 1.d4 Nf6 2.c4 g6 3.Nc3 d5 4.Nf3 Bg7 5.e3
- D95: 1.d4 Nf6 2.c4 g6 3.Nc3 d5 4.Nf3 Bg7 5.e3 0-0 6.Qb3
- D96: 1.d4 Nf6 2.c4 g6 3.Nc3 d5 4.Nf3 Bg7 5.Qb3
- D97: 1.d4 Nf6 2.c4 g6 3.Nc3 d5 4.Nf3 Bg7 5.Qb3 dxc4
- D98: 1.d4 Nf6 2.c4 g6 3.Nc3 d5 4.Nf3 Bg7 5.Qb3 dxc4 6.Qxc4 0-0 7.e4 Bg4
- D99: 1.d4 Nf6 2.c4 g6 3.Nc3 d5 4.Nf3 Bg7 5.Qb3 dxc4 6.Qxc4 0-0 7.e4 Bg4 8.Be3 Nfd7 9.Qb3

== See also ==
- List of chess openings
- List of chess openings named after people
