= Old Indian Defense =

Chess opening

Position: a8 black rook, b8 black knight, c8 black bishop, d8 black queen, e8 black king, f8 black bishop, h8 black rook, a7 black pawn, b7 black pawn, c7 black pawn, e7 black pawn, f7 black pawn, g7 black pawn, h7 black pawn, d6 black pawn, f6 black knight, c4 white pawn, d4 white pawn, a2 white pawn, b2 white pawn, e2 white pawn, f2 white pawn, g2 white pawn, h2 white pawn, a1 white rook, b1 white knight, c1 white bishop, d1 white queen, e1 white king, f1 white bishop, g1 white knight, h1 white rook
- Moves: 1.d4 Nf6 2.c4 d6
- ECO: A53–A55
- Parent: Indian Defence
- Synonym: Chigorin Indian

The Old Indian Defense is a chess opening defined by the moves:

1. d4 Nf6
2. c4 d6

This opening is distinguished from the King's Indian Defense in that Black develops their king's bishop on e7 rather than by fianchetto on g7. Mikhail Chigorin pioneered this defense late in his career.

The Old Indian is considered sound, though developing the bishop at e7 is less active than the fianchetto, and it has never attained the popularity of the King's Indian. Some King's Indian players will use the Old Indian to avoid certain anti-King's Indian systems, such as the Sämisch and Averbakh Variations.

The opening is classified in the Encyclopaedia of Chess Openings with the codes A53–A55.

== Main line: 3.Nc3 e5 ==
Position: a8 black rook, c8 black bishop, d8 black queen, e8 black king, f8 black bishop, h8 black rook, a7 black pawn, b7 black pawn, c7 black pawn, d7 black knight, f7 black pawn, g7 black pawn, h7 black pawn, d6 black pawn, f6 black knight, e5 black pawn, c4 white pawn, d4 white pawn, e4 white pawn, c3 white knight, f3 white knight, a2 white pawn, b2 white pawn, f2 white pawn, g2 white pawn, h2 white pawn, a1 white rook, c1 white bishop, d1 white queen, e1 white king, f1 white bishop, h1 white rook

Main line: 3.Nc3 e5 4.Nf3 Nbd7 5.e4

The Main line, also known as the Ukrainian Variation, arises after 3.Nc3 e5 4.Nf3 Nbd7 5.e4; White can also play 4.dxe5 dxe5 5.Qxd8+, but despite the displacement of Black's king, this does not appear to give an advantage, e.g. 5...Kxd8 6.Nf3 Nfd7!, with Black often following up with some combination of ...c6, ...Kd8–c7, ...a5, ...Na6, and ...f6. Black's position is solid and their piece coordination is good; White's pawn exchange in the center has allowed Black equal space and freed the f8-bishop. After 5...Be7 6.Be2 0-0 7.0-0 c6 8.Re1 (or 8.Be3), White stands slightly better.

== Janowski Variation: 3.Nc3 Bf5 ==
Position: a8 black rook, b8 black knight, d8 black queen, e8 black king, f8 black bishop, h8 black rook, a7 black pawn, b7 black pawn, c7 black pawn, e7 black pawn, f7 black pawn, g7 black pawn, h7 black pawn, d6 black pawn, f6 black knight, f5 black bishop, c4 white pawn, d4 white pawn, c3 white knight, a2 white pawn, b2 white pawn, e2 white pawn, f2 white pawn, g2 white pawn, h2 white pawn, a1 white rook, c1 white bishop, d1 white queen, e1 white king, f1 white bishop, g1 white knight, h1 white rook

Janowski Variation: 3.Nc3 Bf5

The Janowski Variation, 3.Nc3 Bf5, was first introduced by Dawid Janowski in the 1920s. The idea behind it is that 3...Bf5 prevents White from immediately grabbing space with 4.e4. The variation did not gain much popularity until the 1980s. Several top-level players have employed the line multiple times, including Mikhail Tal, Bent Larsen, Florin Gheorghiu, and Kamran Shirazi.

== 3.Nf3 ==
Or via the transposition 2.Nf3 d6 3.c4. Now:

- 3...Bg4 (Tartakower-Indian Variation) is suggested by de Firmian.
- 3...c6 (Czech Variation) and 3...Bf5 are possible.
- 3...g6 will likely transpose to the King's Indian Defence.
- 3...Nbd7 4.Nc3 will likely transpose to the Main line.

== See also ==
- List of chess openings
