= Pirc Defence =

Chess opening

Position: a8 black rook, b8 black knight, c8 black bishop, d8 black queen, e8 black king, f8 black bishop, g8 black knight, h8 black rook, a7 black pawn, b7 black pawn, c7 black pawn, e7 black pawn, f7 black pawn, g7 black pawn, h7 black pawn, d6 black pawn, e4 white pawn, a2 white pawn, b2 white pawn, c2 white pawn, d2 white pawn, f2 white pawn, g2 white pawn, h2 white pawn, a1 white rook, b1 white knight, c1 white bishop, d1 white queen, e1 white king, f1 white bishop, g1 white knight, h1 white rook
1.e4 d6
Position: a8 black rook, b8 black knight, c8 black bishop, d8 black queen, e8 black king, f8 black bishop, h8 black rook, a7 black pawn, b7 black pawn, c7 black pawn, e7 black pawn, f7 black pawn, h7 black pawn, d6 black pawn, f6 black knight, g6 black pawn, d4 white pawn, e4 white pawn, c3 white knight, a2 white pawn, b2 white pawn, c2 white pawn, f2 white pawn, g2 white pawn, h2 white pawn, a1 white rook, c1 white bishop, d1 white queen, e1 white king, f1 white bishop, g1 white knight, h1 white rook
1.e4 d6 2.d4 Nf6 3.Nc3 g6
- ECO: B07–B09
- Named after: Vasja Pirc
- Parent: King's Pawn Game
- Synonyms: Pirc–Ufimtsev Defence; Ufimtsev Defence; Yugoslav Defence

The Pirc Defence (/ˈpɪərts/ PEERTS) is a chess opening beginning with the moves:

1. e4 d6
2. d4 Nf6
3. Nc3 g6

In hypermodern fashion, Black allows White to establish a centre with pawns on d4 and e4, but plans to undermine it later. This position can be reached by several move orders; the move sequence given above is the most common.

Some writers define the Pirc Defence more broadly as 1.e4 d6, although 1.e4 d6 often transposes into other openings such as the Philidor Defence. Alternatives to 3...g6 for Black include 3...c6, the Czech Defence or Pribyl Defence, as well as 3...e5 and 3...Nbd7, both of which are often played with the intention of transposing into a solid line of the Philidor.

The Pirc Defence is closely related to the Modern Defence (1...g6), also known as the Robatsch Defence, the primary difference being that Black delays developing the knight to f6 in the Modern. The main line is also similar to the King's Indian Defence, with the difference being that that White has not played c4 before playing Nc3.

The Pirc Defence is named after the Yugoslav grandmaster Vasja Pirc, who frequently played it from the late 1940s and throughout his later career. In Russia and other former Soviet countries, it is often known as the "Ufimtsev Defence" or "Pirc–Ufimtsev Defence", after the Soviet master Anatoly Ufimtsev.

== History ==
The Pirc Defence, named after Slovenian grandmaster (GM) Vasja Pirc, was occasionally played in the 19th century but was considered an irregular opening. The opening began gaining some popularity only after World War II, and by the 1960s it was regarded as playable, owing in large part to the efforts of Canadian GM Duncan Suttles. Black, in hypermodern fashion, does not immediately stake a claim in the centre with pawns; rather, Black works to undermine White's centre from the flanks. Its first appearance in a World Championship match was in 1972, when it was played by Bobby Fischer against Boris Spassky at Reykjavík (game 17); the game ended in a draw.

The Pirc has been criticized for passivity. According to Garry Kasparov, the Pirc Defence is "hardly worth using in the tournaments of the highest category", as it gives White "too many opportunities for anybody's liking".

== Definition ==
Hooper and Whyld gave a distinct formal definition, 1.d4 d6 2.e4 Nf6 3.Nc3 g6, permuting White's first two moves, although they qualified the definition by remarking that 1.e4 d6 could also transpose to the Pirc. The presence or absence of Black's third move in the Pirc is reported differently, according to the source; with the pawn move 3...g6, Black prepares to fianchetto the king's bishop to g7. Paul van der Sterren therefore described 3...g6 as "the defining move of the Pirc Defence" because the development of the bishop to g7 "creates the same sort of positional tension as the King's Indian Defence". Unlike in the King's Indian, in the Pirc, White plays Nc3 without having first played c4.

A distinction is usually drawn between the Pirc and lines where Black delays the development of the knight to f6, or omits it altogether; this is known as the Modern Defence (or Robatsch Defence). The tenth edition of Modern Chess Openings (1965) merged the Pirc and Robatsch together as the "Pirc–Robatsch Defense". 1.e4 g6 2.d4 Bg7 3.Nf3 d6 is the Pirc Defence Deferred.

== Austrian Attack: 4.f4 ==
Position: a8 black rook, b8 black knight, c8 black bishop, d8 black queen, e8 black king, h8 black rook, a7 black pawn, b7 black pawn, c7 black pawn, e7 black pawn, f7 black pawn, g7 black bishop, h7 black pawn, d6 black pawn, f6 black knight, g6 black pawn, d4 white pawn, e4 white pawn, f4 white pawn, c3 white knight, f3 white knight, a2 white pawn, b2 white pawn, c2 white pawn, g2 white pawn, h2 white pawn, a1 white rook, c1 white bishop, d1 white queen, e1 white king, f1 white bishop, h1 white rook

Austrian Attack after 1.e4 d6 2.d4 Nf6 3.Nc3 g6 4.f4 Bg7 5.Nf3

The Austrian Attack is defined by 4.f4. This direct, aggressive line is one of the most ambitious systems against the Pirc. It aims to take advantage of Black's hypermodern approach by establishing a broad pawn centre early in the game. White's general strategy is to use the advanced f-pawn to support a breakthrough with e4–e5. Black will often castle early and attempt to find counterplay with c7–c5, or in some cases, e7–e5, or the development of the queenside knight.

Siegbert Tarrasch successfully employed the Austrian Attack against Rudolf Charousek in 1896, securing a win in just 17 moves. Edward Lasker unsuccessfully used the opening against Miguel Najdorf, resigning after 42 moves. In the 17th game of the 1972 World Chess Championship, Bobby Fischer responded to Boris Spassky's 1.e4 with the Pirc Defence, for the only time in his career. Spassky played the Austrian Attack. The game ended in a draw. It is also well respected by Nick de Firmian, the author of Modern Chess Openings. Jan Timman has played the Austrian successfully with both colours.

After the usual 4...Bg7 5.Nf3, the main moves are 5...0-0 or 5...c5, a queenside counterattack. White can also try an immediate kingside attack with 5.e5 Nfd7 or develop with 5.Bd3.

=== 4...Bg7 5.Nf3 0-0 ===
The most frequently played move after 5...0-0 is 6.Bd3 (the Weiss Variation), with 6...Nc6 the most common response, though 6....Na6, with the idea of ....Nc7, ....Rb8 and ....b5 became popular in the 1980s after 6....Nc6 was found to offer Black few winning chances. 6.e5 is a sharp try, with unclear consequences, which was much played in the 1960s, though it has never attained popularity at the highest levels. 6.Be2 is another move which was often seen in the 1950s and early 1960s, although the defeat sustained by Fischer in the game given in the example games spurred White players, including Fischer, to turn to 6.Bd3. In the 1980s, 6.Be2 c5 7.dxc5 Qa5 8.0-0 Qxc5+ 9.Kh1 was revived with more favourable results. 6.Be3 is another possibility, first extensively explored in the 1970s and played by Bojan Kurajica, Yuri Balashov and Alexander Beliavsky, which leads to sharp play.

=== 4...Bg7 5.Nf3 c5 ===
Black's chief alternative to 5...0-0 lies in an immediate strike against the white centre with 5...c5, to which the usual response is either 6.dxc5 or 6.Bb5+. The former allows 6...Qa5. The latter promises a tactical melee, with a common line being 6.Bb5+ Bd7 7.e5 Ng4 8.e6 (8.h3 or 8.Bxd7+ are other possibilities) 8...fxe6, which was thought bad, until Yasser Seirawan played the move against Gyula Sax in 1988 (8...Bxb5 is the alternative, if Black does not want the forced draw in the main line), continuing 9.Ng5 Bxb5! Now if White tries 10.Nxe6, Black has 10...Bxd4!, ignoring the threat to his queen, in view of 11.Nxd8 Bf2+ 12.Kd2 Be3+ with a draw by perpetual check. White can instead try 11.Nxb5, with complicated play.

White can also essay the sharp 6.e5 against 5...c5, after which 6...Nfd7 7.exd6 0-0 is considered to offer good play for Black.

== Classical System: 4.Nf3 ==
Position: a8 black rook, b8 black knight, c8 black bishop, d8 black queen, f8 black rook, g8 black king, a7 black pawn, b7 black pawn, c7 black pawn, e7 black pawn, f7 black pawn, g7 black bishop, h7 black pawn, d6 black pawn, f6 black knight, g6 black pawn, d4 white pawn, e4 white pawn, c3 white knight, f3 white knight, a2 white pawn, b2 white pawn, c2 white pawn, e2 white bishop, f2 white pawn, g2 white pawn, h2 white pawn, a1 white rook, c1 white bishop, d1 white queen, f1 white rook, g1 white king

Classical System after: 4.Nf3 Bg7 5.Be2 0-0 6.0-0

The Classical System, also known as the Two Knights System, begins with 4.Nf3 Bg7 5.Be2 0-0 6.0-0. White contents themselves with the 'classical' pawn centre with pawns at e4 and d4, forgoing the committal move f2–f4 as Black castles and builds a compact structure. Efim Geller, Anatoly Karpov and Evgeni Vasiukov have all successfully used this system for White; Zurab Azmaiparashvili has scored well as Black. This transposes into the Sicilian Dragon after 6...c5 7.Be3 cxd4 8.Nxd4.

== Systems with Be3 ==
The setup f2–f3, Be3 and Qd2 is commonly used against the King's Indian Defence and Dragon Sicilian, and can also be used against the Pirc; indeed, this system is as old as the Pirc itself.

The system 4.f3 was introduced by Argentine players c. 1930 and again in 1950. It was never considered dangerous for Black because of 4.f3 Bg7 5.Be3 c6 6.Qd2 b5. It received a severe blow in about 1985, when Gennady Zaichik showed that Black could castle anyway and play a dangerous gambit with 5...0-0 6.Qd2 e5.

The Argentines feared the sally ...Ng4, though some British players (especially Mark Hebden, Paul Motwani, Gary Lane and later also Michael Adams) came to realise that this was mainly dangerous for Black, therefore playing Be3 and Qd2 in all sorts of move orders, while omitting f2–f3. They called this the 150 Attack, because players of this strength (150 ECF, equivalent to about 1825 Elo) can easily play this position and get strong play without any theory.

The original Argentine idea probably is only viable after 4.Be3 Bg7 5.Qd2 0-0 6.0-0-0 c6 (or Nc6) 7.f3 b5 8.h4. Black usually does not castle, though, and prefers 5...c6 or even 4...c6. The question of whether and when to insert Nf3 remains unclear.

== Other systems ==
- 4.Bg5 was introduced by Robert Byrne in the 1960s, after which Black has often played the natural 4...Bg7, though 4...c6 is considered more flexible, as Black may wish to save a tempo in anticipation of White's plan of Qd2, followed by Bh6, by deferring ...Bg7 as long as possible, playing for queenside activity with ...b7–b5 and ...Qa5. White's idea of Qd2 and Bh6 may give a transposition to the lines with Be3 and Qd2. Less commons methods of playing this system include 4.Nf3 Bg7 5.Bg5 and 4.Bg5 Bg7 5.f4 (followed by 6.Nf3, 7.Bd3, 8.0-0 as played by Robert Byrne, with the intention of playing an Austrian Attack without blocking the dark-squared bishop.)
- 4.Bf4. This formerly rare move has become more popular lately, in large part because the position can come about via a fashionable line of the London System: 1.d4 Nf6 2.Bf4 g6 3.Nc3 d6 4.e4.
- 4.Bc4 Bg7 5.Qe2 is a sharp try for advantage; 5...Nc6 can lead to hair-raising complications after 6.e5, when Black's best line may be 6...Ng4 7.e6 Nxd4 8.Qxg4 Nxc2+, avoiding the more frequently played 6...Nxd4 7.exf6 Nxe2 8.fxg7 Rg8 9.Ngxe2 Rxg7, which has been generally considered to lead to an equal or unclear position, though White has scored heavily in practice. 6...Nd7 is now considered fine for Black, in view of 7.e6?! fxe6 8.Qxe6 Nde5! 9.Qd5 e6 with advantage to Black. If White instead plays the better 7.Nf3, Black has multiple solid choices, including 7...0-0 and 7...Nb6 (followed by ...Na5), which is considered to equalise. Another possibility for Black is 5...c6, though 6.e5 dxe5 7.dxe5 Nd5 8.Bd2, followed by long castling, gives White the advantage, as Black's position is cramped and he lacks active counterplay.
- 4.g3 and 5.Bg2, followed by Nge2, is a solid line, which was sometimes adopted by Karpov.
- 4.Be3 is another alternative. Considered relatively passive in earlier times, today's practice uses this move as a flexible entry into lines that may feature h3/Nf3 or even h3/g4/Bg2 – while still maintaining the option of returning to 150-like plans or the Austrian if Black commits to moves that do not help in this type of position.
- 4.Be2 may transpose into the Classical System after 4...Bg7 5.Nf3, or White may try one of two highly aggressive lines, the Bayonet Attack (5.h4) or the Chinese Variation (5.g4).

== Alternatives to 3...g6 ==
=== 3...c6 ===
After 1.e4 d6 2.d4 Nf6 3.Nc3, an alternative to 3...g6 is 3...c6, which has been called the Pribyl System and the Czech Defence. If Black later plays ...g6, it often transposes to the Pirc proper; alternatively, Black can play ...Qa5 and ...e5 to challenge White's centre, or expand on the queenside with ...b5.

=== 3...e5 ===
3...e5 is an alternative to 3...g6 that became common in the 21st century and now rivals 3...g6 in popularity. The move has been tried by many GMs over the years, including Zurab Azmaiparashvili and Christian Bauer. Black has the idea of encouraging White to transpose via 4.Nf3 to a relatively less challenging line (for Black) of the Philidor Defence, which is traditionally reached via 1.e4 e5 2.Nf3 d6; 3.d4 Nf6 4.Nc3 would transpose. In the traditional 1...e5 move order, White frequently avoids or delays Nc3, whereas in the 1...d6 move order, the early 2.Nc3 limits White's options. Black usually responds to 4.Nf3 with 4...Nbd7.

On the other hand, the 1...d6 order allows White to instead play 4.dxe5 dxe5 5.Qxd8+ Kxd8, typically continuing 6.Bc4 Be6 7.Bxe6 fxe6, which, despite Black's loss of castling rights, results in a drawish endgame, a similar idea to the famous Berlin Endgame. The 1...d6 move order, leading to the variation with an early Nc3, may be referred to as the Modern Philidor, while the 1...e5 move order may be called the Old Philidor.

=== 3...Nbd7 ===
3...Nbd7 has the idea of transposing to the same line (with 4...Nbd7) of the Philidor explained above after 4.Nf3 and then 4...e5. This move order denies White the opportunity to play the endgame reachable after 3...e5 4.dxe5; however, White can deviate in other ways, most often by playing 4.f4 instead of 4.Nf3.

== Earlier deviations ==
An unusual but quite reasonable deviation for White after 1.e4 d6 2.d4 Nf6 is 3.f3. At the 1989 Barcelona World Cup event, former world champion Garry Kasparov surprised American GM Yasser Seirawan with this move. After 3...g6 4.c4, an unhappy Seirawan found himself defending the King's Indian Defence for the first time in his life, though he managed to draw the game. Black can avoid a King's Indian with 3...e5, which may lead to an Old Indian type of position after 4.d5, with 3...c5, which may lead to a Benoni type of position after 4.d5 or transpose to Prins Variation of the Sicilian Defence after 4.Ne2 cxd4 5.Nxd4, or with 3...d5. This can transpose to the French Defence after (among other possible transpositions) 4.e5 Nfd7 5.f4 e6 6.Nf3 or to the Blackmar–Diemer Gambit with an extra tempo for White after 4.Nc3 dxe4 5.Bg5 exf3 6.Nxf3.

Another possibility for White to defend the e-pawn is 3.Bd3, or, less frequently, 3.Nd2.

== Example games ==
- Bobby Fischer vs. Viktor Korchnoi, Curaçao 1962
  1.e4 d6 2.d4 Nf6 3.Nc3 g6 4.f4 Bg7 5.Nf3 0-0 6.Be2 c5 7.dxc5 Qa5 8.0-0 Qxc5+ 9.Kh1 Nc6 10.Nd2 a5 11.Nb3 Qb6 12.a4 Nb4 13.g4? Bxg4! 14.Bxg4 Nxg4 15.Qxg4 Nxc2 16.Nb5 Nxa1 17.Nxa1 Qc6 18.f5 Qc4 19.Qf3 Qxa4 20.Nc7 Qxa1 21.Nd5 Rae8 22.Bg5 Qxb2 23.Bxe7 Be5 24.Rf2 Qc1+ 25.Rf1 Qh6 26.h3 gxf5 27.Bxf8 Rxf8 28.Ne7+ Kh8 29.Nxf5 Qe6 30.Rg1 a4 31.Rg4 Qb3 32.Qf1 a3 33.Rg3 Qxg3 0–1
- In the following game, Zurab Azmaiparashvili used the Pirc to defeat reigning world chess champion Anatoly Karpov.
  Anatoly Karpov vs. Zurab Azmaiparashvili, USSR Championship, Moscow 1983
  1.e4 d6 2.d4 g6 3.Nf3 Nf6 4.Nc3 Bg7 5.Be2 0-0 6.0-0 Bg4 7.Be3 Nc6 8.Qd2 e5 9.d5 Ne7 10.Rad1 b5 11.a3 a5 12.b4 axb4 13.axb4 Ra3 14.Bg5 Rxc3 15.Bxf6 Bxf3 16.Bxf3 Ra3 17.Bxg7 Kxg7 18.Ra1 Qa8 19.Rxa3 Qxa3 20.Be2 Qb2 21.Rd1 f5 22.exf5 Nxf5 23.c3 Qxd2 24.Rxd2 Ra8 25.Bxb5 Ra3 26.Rc2 Ne7 27.f4 exf4 28.Bc6 Nf5 29.Kf2 Ne3 30.Rc1 Kf6 31.g3 Ke5 32.Kf3 g5 33.gxf4+ gxf4 34.h4 Nxd5 35.Bxd5 Kxd5 36.Kxf4 Kc4 37.Re1 Rxc3 38.Re7 Kxb4 39.Rxh7 d5 40.Ke5 c6 41.Kd4 Rc4+ 0–1
- Called Kasparov's Immortal, this game has been called "the most famous Pirc game of all time".
  Garry Kasparov vs. Veselin Topalov, Wijk aan Zee 1999
  1.e4 d6 2.d4 Nf6 3.Nc3 g6 4.Be3 Bg7 5.Qd2 c6 6.f3 b5 7.Nge2 Nbd7 8.Bh6 Bxh6 9.Qxh6 Bb7 10.a3 e5 11.0-0-0 Qe7 12.Kb1 a6 13.Nc1 0-0-0 14.Nb3 exd4 15.Rxd4 c5 16.Rd1 Nb6 17.g3 Kb8 18.Na5 Ba8 19.Bh3 d5 20.Qf4+ Ka7 21.Rhe1 d4 22.Nd5 Nbxd5 23.exd5 Qd6 24.Rxd4 cxd4 25.Re7+ Kb6 26.Qxd4+ Kxa5 27.b4+ Ka4 28.Qc3 Qxd5 29.Ra7 Bb7 30.Rxb7 Qc4 31.Qxf6 Kxa3 32.Qxa6+ Kxb4 33.c3+ Kxc3 34.Qa1+ Kd2 35.Qb2+ Kd1 36.Bf1 Rd2 37.Rd7 Rxd7 38.Bxc4 bxc4 39.Qxh8 Rd3 40.Qa8 c3 41.Qa4+ Ke1 42.f4 f5 43.Kc1 Rd2 44.Qa7 1–0

== ECO codes ==
Some of the systems employed by White against the Pirc Defence include the following (in order by Encyclopaedia of Chess Openings code):

- B07
  - 4.Bc4 Kholmov System (4.Bc4 Bg7 5.Qe2)
  - 4.Be2 sub-variants after 4...Bg7 include the Chinese Variation (5.g4), and the Bayonet (Mariotti) Attack (5.h4)
  - 4.Be3 150 or "Caveman" Attack (4.Be3 c6 5.Qd2)
  - 4.Bg5 Byrne Variation
  - 4.g3 Sveshnikov System
- B08
  - 4.Nf3 Classical (Two Knights) System (sub-variants after 4...Bg7 include 5.h3 and 5.Be2)
- B09
  - 4.f4 Austrian Attack (sub-variants after 4.f4 Bg7 5.Nf3 0-0 include 6.e5, 6.Be2, 6.Bd3 and 6.Be3; also, after 4...Bg7 is 5.Bc4, the Ljubojevic Variation; Black also has the option to move into the Dragon Formation after 5.Nf3 with 5...c5)

== See also ==
- List of chess openings
- List of chess openings named after people
