= List of chess openings named after people =

The Oxford Companion to Chess lists 1,327 named openings and variants. Chess players' names are the most common sources of opening names. The name given to an opening is not always that of the first player to adopt it; often an opening is named for the player who was one of the first to popularise it or to publish analysis of it.

== A ==
- Abonyi Variation of the Budapest Gambit – 1.d4 Nf6 2.c4 e5 3.dxe5 Ng4 4.e4 Nxe5 5.f4 Nec6 – named after István Abonyi
- Adams Attack of the Sicilian Defence – 1.e4 c5 2.Nf3 d6 3.d4 cxd4 4.Nxd4 Nf6 5.Nc3 a6 6.h3 – named after Weaver W. Adams
- Adler Variation of the Budapest Gambit – 1.d4 Nf6 2.c4 e5 3.dxe5 Ng4 4.Nf3 – named after Mór Adler
- Alapin's Opening – 1.e4 e5 2.Ne2 – named after Semyon Alapin
- Alapin Variation of the Sicilian Defence – 1.e4 c5 2.c3 – named after Semyon Alapin
- Albin Countergambit – 1.d4 d5 2.c4 e5 – named after Adolf Albin
- Alburt Variation of the Alekhine's Defence – 1.e4 Nf6 2.e5 Nd5 3.d4 d6 4.Nf3 g6 – named after Lev Alburt
- Alekhine–Chatard Attack on the French Defence – 1.e4 e6 2.d4 d5 3.Nc3 Nf6 4.Bg5 Be7 5.e5 Nfd7 6.h4 – named after Alexander Alekhine and Eugene Chatard
- Alekhine's Defence – 1.e4 Nf6 – named after Alexander Alekhine
- Alekhine Variation of the Budapest Gambit – 1.d4 Nf6 2.c4 e5 3.dxe5 Ng4 4.e4 – named after Alexander Alekhine
- Alien Gambit of the Caro–Kann Defence – 1.e4 c6 2.d4 d5 3.Nc3 dxe4 4.Nxe4 Nf6 5.Ng5 – named after chess YouTuber Witty_Alien
- Allgaier Gambit of the King's Gambit – 1.e4 e5 2.f4 exf4 3.Nf3 g5 4.h4 g4 5.Ng5 – named after Johann Baptist Allgaier
- Amar Opening – 1.Nh3 – named after Charles Amar
- Anderssen's Opening – 1.a3 – named after Adolf Anderssen
- Arkell–Khenkin Variation of the Caro–Kann Defense – 1.e4 c6 2.d4 d5 3.e5 c5 – named after Keith Arkell and Igor Khenkin
- Averbakh System of the King's Indian Defence – 1.d4 Nf6 2.c4 g6 3.Nc3 Bg7 4.e4 d6 5.Be2 0-0 6.Bg5 – named after Yuri Averbakh

== B ==
- Balogh Defense – 1.e4 d6 2.d4 f5 – named after János Balogh
- Barcza System – 1.Nf3 d5 2.g3 – named after Gedeon Barcza
- Barnes Opening – 1.f3 – named after Thomas Wilson Barnes
- Basman Defence – 1.e4 g5 – named after Michael Basman
- Becker Defense of the King's Gambit – 1.e4 e5 2.f4 exf4 3.Nf3 h6 – named after Albert Becker
- Bellon Gambit – 1.c4 e5 2.Nc3 Nf6 3.Nf3 e4 4.Ng5 b5 – named after Juan Manuel Bellón López
- Benko Gambit – 1.d4 Nf6 2.c4 c5 3.d5 b5 – named after Pal Benko
- Benko's Opening – 1.g3 – named after Pal Benko
- Bird Defense of the Ruy Lopez – 1.e4 e5 2.Nf3 Nc6 3.Bb5 Nd4 – named after Henry Bird
- Bird's Opening – 1.f4 – named after Henry Bird
- Blackburne Shilling Gambit – 1.e4 e5 2.Nf3 Nc6 3.Bc4 Nd4 – named after Joseph Henry Blackburne
- Blackmar–Diemer Gambit – 1.d4 d5 2.e4 dxe4 3.Nc3 – named after Armand Blackmar and Emil Josef Diemer
- Blumenfeld Gambit – 1.d4 Nf6 2.c4 c5 3.d5 e6 4.Nf3 b5 – named after Benjamin Blumenfeld
- Boden–Kieseritzky Gambit – 1.e4 e5 2.Bc4 Nf6 3.Nf3 Nxe4 4.Nc3 – named after Samuel Boden and Lionel Kieseritzky
- Bogo-Indian Defence – 1.d4 Nf6 2.c4 e6 3.Nf3 Bb4+ – named after Efim Bogoljubov
- Bogoljubov Defense – 1.d4 Nf6 2.c4 Nc6 – named after Efim Bogoljubov
- Boleslavsky Variation of the Sicilian Defence – 1.e4 c5 2.Nf3 d6 3.d4 cxd4 4.Nxd4 Nf6 5.Nc3 Nc6 6.Be2 e5 – named after Isaac Boleslavsky
- Bongcloud Attack – 1.e4 e5 2.Ke2 – named after Chess.com user Lenny_Bongcloud, who used this opening many times, and kept losing
- Bonsch-Osmolovsky Defense of the King's Gambit – 1.e4 e5 2.f4 exf4 3.Nf3 Ne7 – named after Mikhail Bonsch-Osmolovsky
- Botvinnik System of the Semi-Slav Defense – 1.d4 d5 2.c4 e6 3.Nc3 Nf6 4.Nf3 c6 5.Bg5 dxc4 6.e4 b5 – named after Mikhail Botvinnik
- Botvinnik Variation of the English Opening – 1.c4 e5 2.Nc3 Nc6 3.g3 g6 4.Bg2 Bg7 5.e4 – named after Mikhail Botvinnik
- Brentano Defense of the Ruy Lopez – 1.e4 e5 2.Nf3 Nc6 3.Bb5 g5 – named after Franz Brentano
- Breyer Variation of the King's Gambit – 1.e4 e5 2.f4 exf4 3.Qf3 – named after Gyula Breyer
- Breyer Variation of the Ruy Lopez – 1.e4 e5 2.Nf3 Nc6 3.Bb5 a6 4.Ba4 Nf6 5.0-0 Be7 6.Re1 b5 7.Bb3 0-0 8.c3 d6 9.h3 Nb8 – named after Gyula Breyer

== C ==
- Camara Defense – 1.e4 e5 2.Nf3 Qe7 – named after International Master Hélder Câmara
- Capablanca Variation of the Reti Opening – 1.Nf3 d5 2.c4 c6 3.b3 Nf6 4.Bb2 Bg4 – named after José Raúl Capablanca
- Caro–Kann Defence – 1.e4 c6 – named after Horatio Caro and Marcus Kann
- Carrera Gambit of the King's Gambit – 1.e4 e5 2.f4 exf4 3.Qh5 – named after Pietro Carrera
- Chekhover Variation of the Sicilian Defence – 1.e4 c5 2.Nf3 d6 3.d4 cxd4 4.Qxd4 – named after Vitaly Chekhover
- Chigorin Defence of the Queen's Gambit – 1.d4 d5 2.c4 Nc6 – named after Mikhail Chigorin
- Chigorin Variation of the French Defence – 1.e4 e6 2.Qe2 – named after Mikhail Chigorin
- Chigorin Variation of the Ruy Lopez – 1.e4 e5 2.Nf3 Nc6 3.Bb5 a6 4.Ba4 Nf6 5.0-0 Be7 6.Re1 b5 7.Bb3 0-0 8.c3 d6 9.h3 Na5 – named after Mikhail Chigorin
- Clemenz Opening – 1.h3 – named after Hermann Clemenz
- Cochrane Gambit of the Petrov's Defence – 1.e4 e5 2.Nf3 Nf6 3.Nxe5 d6 4.Nxf7 – named after John Cochrane
- Colle System – 1.d4 d5 2.Nf3 Nf6 3.e3 – named after Edgard Colle
- Colman Variation of the Two Knights Defense – 1.e4 e5 2.Nf3 Nc6 3.Bc4 Nf6 4.Ng5 d5 5.exd5 Na5 6.Bb5+ c6 7.dxc6 bxc6 8.Qf3 Rb8 – named after Eugene Ernest Colman
- Cozio Defence of the Ruy Lopez – 1.e4 e5 2.Nf3 Nc6 3.Bb5 Nge7 – named after Carlo Cozio
- Cunningham Defense of the King's Gambit – 1.e4 e5 2.f4 exf4 3.Nf3 Be7 – named after Alexander Cunningham

== D ==
- Damiano Defence – 1.e4 e5 2.Nf3 f6 – named after Pedro Damiano although he gave the refutation rather than endorsing it
- Desprez Opening – 1.h4 – named after Marcel Desprez
- Döry Defence – 1.d4 Nf6 2.c4 e6 3.Nf3 Ne4 – named after Ladislaus Döry
- Dubov Tarrasch – 1.d4 d5 2.c4 e6 3.Nf3 Nf6 4.Nc3 c5 5.cxd5 exd5 6.g3 Nc6 7.Bg2 cxd4 8.Nxd4 Bc5 – named after Daniil Dubov
- Dunst Opening – 1.Nc3 – named after Ted A. Dunst
- Duras Variation of the Ruy Lopez – 1.e4 e5 2.Nf3 Nc6 3.Bb5 a6 4.Ba4 d6 5.c4 – named after Oldřich Duras
- Durkin Opening – 1.Na3 – named after Robert Durkin

== E ==
- Eisenberg Gambit of the King's Gambit – 1.e4 e5 2.f4 exf4 3.Nh3 – named after Louis Eisenberg
- Englund Gambit – 1.d4 e5 – named after Fritz Englund
- Epishin Variation of the Benko Gambit – 1.d4 Nf6 2.c4 c5 3.d5 b5 4.cxb5 a6 5.bxa6 g6 6.Nc3 Bxa6 7.Nf3 d6 8.g3 Bg7 9.Bg2 Nbd7 10.Rb1 – named after Vladimir Epishin
- Evans Gambit – 1.e4 e5 2.Nf3 Nc6 3.Bc4 Bc5 4.b4 – named after William Davies Evans

== F ==
- Fajarowicz Variation of the Budapest Gambit – 1.d4 Nf6 2.c4 e5 3.dxe5 Ne4 – named after Sammi Fajarowicz
- Falkbeer Countergambit of the King's Gambit – 1.e4 e5 2.f4 d5 – named after Ernst Falkbeer
- Fischer Defense of the King's Gambit – 1.e4 e5 2.f4 exf4 3.Nf3 d6 – named after Bobby Fischer
- Fleissig Variation of the Scotch Game – 1.e4 e5 2.Nf3 Nc6 3.d4 exd4 4.Nxd4 Bc5 5.Be3 Qf6 6.c3 Nge7 7.Nc2 – named after Bernhard Fleissig
- Flohr–Mikenas–Carls Variation of the English Opening – 1.c4 Nf6 2.Nc3 e6 3.e4 – named after Salo Flohr, Vladas Mikėnas and Carl Johan Margot Carls
- Flohr Variation of the Caro–Kann Defence – 1.e4 c6 2.d4 d5 3.Nc3 dxe4 4.Nxe4 Bf5 5.Ng3 Bg6 6.Nh3 – named after Salo Flohr
- Flohr Variation of the Grünfeld Defence – 1.d4 Nf6 2.c4 g6 3.Nc3 d5 4.Nf3 Bg7 5.Qa4+ – named after Salo Flohr
- Frankenstein–Dracula Variation of the Vienna Game – 1.e4 e5 2.Nc3 Nf6 3.Bc4 Nxe4 – named after Frankenstein's monster and Count Dracula
- From's Gambit of the Bird's Opening – 1.f4 e5 – named after Martin Severin From
- Furman Variation of the Queen's Gambit Accepted – 1.d4 d5 2.c4 dxc4 3.Nf3 Nf6 4.e3 e6 5.Bxc4 c5 6.0-0 a6 7.dxc5 Bxc5 – named after Semyon Furman

== G ==
- Gajewski Gambit of the Ruy Lopez – 1.e4 e5 2.Nf3 Nc6 3.Bb5 a6 4.Ba4 Nf6 5.0-0 Be7 6.Re1 b5 7.Bb3 d6 8.c3 0-0 9.h3 Na5 10.Bc2 d5 – named after Grzegorz Gajewski
- Glek Defense of the King's Indian Defence – 1.d4 Nf6 2.c4 g6 3.Nc3 Bg7 4.e4 d6 5.Nf3 0-0 6.Be2 e5 7.0-0 Na6 – named after Igor Glek
- Glek Variation of the Four Knights Game – 1.e4 e5 2.Nf3 Nc6 3.Nc3 Nf6 4.g3 – named after Igor Glek
- Gligoric – Taimanov Variation of the King's Indian Defence 1.d4 Nf6 2.c4 g6 3.Nc3 Bg7 4.e4 d6 5.Nf3 0-0 6.Be2 e5 7.Be3 – named after Svetozar Gligorić and Mark Taimanov
- Goglidze Attack – 1.d4 Nf6 2.c4 g6 3.f3 d5 – named after Viktor Goglidze
- Göring Gambit of the Scotch Game – 1.e4 e5 2.Nf3 Nc6 3.d4 exd4 4.c3 – named after Carl Göring
- Grivas Variation of the Sicilian Defence – 1.e4 c5 2.Nf3 Nc6 3.d4 cxd4 4.Nxd4 Qb6 – named after Efstratios Grivas
- Grob's Attack – 1.g4 – named after Henri Grob
- Gunderam Defense – 1.e4 e5 2.Nf3 Qe7 – named after Gerhard Gunderam
- Gurgenidze Defense of the Modern Defense – 1.e4 g6 2.d4 Bg7 3.Nc3 c6 4.f4 d5 5.e5 h5 – named after Bukhuti Gurgenidze
- Gurgenidze Variation of the Caro–Kann Defence – 1.e4 c6 2.d4 d5 3.Nc3 b5 – named after Bukhuti Gurgenidze
- Gurgenidze Variation of the Sicilian Defence – 1.e4 c5 2.Nf3 Nc6 3.Bb5 g6 4.0-0 Bg7 5.Re1 e5 6.b4 – named after Bukhuti Gurgenidze
- Gusev Countergambit of the Queen's Gambit Declined – 1.d4 d5 2.c4 c5 3.cxd5 Nf6 – named after Yuri Gusev
- Greco Defence – 1.e4 e5 2.Nf3 Qf6 – named after Gioachino Greco
- Grünfeld Defence – 1.d4 Nf6 2.c4 g6 3.Nc3 d5 – named after Ernst Grünfeld

== H ==
- Hanham Variation of the Philidor Defense – 1.e4 e5 2.Nf3 d6 3.d4 Nd7 – named after James Hanham
- Harrwitz Attack of the Queen's Gambit Declined – 1.d4 d5 2.c4 e6 3.Nc3 Nf6 4.Bf4 – named after Daniel Harrwitz
- Hodgson Attack – 1.d4 d5 2.Bg5 – named after Julian Hodgson
- Hopton Attack of the Dutch Defence – 1.d4 f5 2.Bg5 – named after Hopton
- Horwitz Defense – 1.d4 e6 – named after Bernhard Horwitz
- Hromádka System of the Benoni Defence – 1.d4 Nf6 2.c4 c5 3.d5 d6 – named after Karel Hromádka
- Hübner Variation of the Nimzo-Indian Defence – 1.d4 Nf6 2.c4 e6 3.Nc3 Bb4 4.e3 c5 – named after Robert Hübner

== I ==
- Ilyin-Genevsky Variation of the Dutch Defence – 1.d4 f5 2.c4 Nf6 3.g3 e6 4.Bg2 Be7 5.Nf3 0-0 6.0-0 d6 7.Nc3 Qe8 – named after Alexander Ilyin-Genevsky

== J ==
- Janowski Variation of the Old Indian Defence – 1.d4 Nf6 2.c4 d6 3.Nc3 Bf5 – named after Dawid Janowski
- Jasnogrodsky Defense of the Rice Gambit – 1.e4 e5 2.f4 exf4 3.Nf3 g5 4.h4 g4 5.Ne5 Nf6 6.Bc4 d5 7.exd5 Bd6 8.0-0 Bxe5 9.Re1 Qe7 10.c3 Nh5 – named after Nicolai Jasnogrodsky
- Jerome Gambit of the Italian Game – 1.e4 e5 2.Nf3 Nc6 3.Bc4 Bc5 4.Bxf7+ – named after Alonzo Wheeler Jerome

== K ==
- Kan Variation of the Sicilian Defence – 1.e4 c5 2.Nf3 e6 3.d4 cxd4 4.Nxd4 a6 – named after Ilya Kan
- Karklins–Martinovsky Variation of the Petrov's Defence – 1.e4 e5 2.Nf3 Nf6 3.Nxe5 d6 4.Nd3 – named after Chicago masters Andrew Karklins and Eugene Martinovsky
- Karpov Variation of the Caro–Kann Defence – 1.e4 c6 2.d4 d5 3.Nc3 dxe4 4.Nxe4 Nd7 – named after Anatoly Karpov
- Karpov Variation of the Ruy Lopez – 1.e4 e5 2.Nf3 Nc6 3.Bb5 a6 4.Ba4 Nf6 5.0-0 Be7 6.Re1 b5 7.Bb3 0-0 8.c3 d6 9.h3 Nd7 – named after Anatoly Karpov
- Kasparov Variation of Pirc Defense – 1.e4 d6 2.d4 Nf6 3.Nc3 g6 4.Be3 Bg7 5.Qd2 – named after Garry Kasparov
- Katalymov Variation of the Sicilian Defence – 1.e4 c5 2.Nf3 b6 – named after Boris Katalymov
- Keene Defense to the King's Gambit – 1.e4 e5 2.f4 Qh4+ 3.g3 Qe7 – named after Raymond Keene
- Keres Attack of the Sicilian Defence – 1.e4 c5 2.Nf3 d6 3.d4 cxd4 4.Nxd4 Nf6 5.Nc3 e6 6.g4 – named after Paul Keres
- Keres Defence – 1.d4 e6 2.c4 Bb4+ – named after Paul Keres
- Keres Variation of the Sicilian Defence – 1.e4 c5 2.Ne2 – named after Paul Keres
- Kevitz Variation of the English Opening – 1.c4 Nf6 2.Nc3 e6 3.e4 Nc6 – named after Alexander Kevitz
- Kholmov Variation of the Ruy Lopez – 1.e4 e5 2.Nf3 Nc6 3.Bb5 a6 4.Ba4 Nf6 5.0-0 Be7 6.Re1 b5 7.Bb3 0-0 8.c3 d6 9.h3 Be6 – named after Ratmir Kholmov
- Kieseritzky Gambit of the King's Gambit – 1.e4 e5 2.f4 exf4 3.Nf3 g5 4.h4 g4 5.Ne5 – named after Lionel Kieseritzky
- Knorre Variation of the Ruy Lopez – 1.e4 e5 2.Nf3 Nc6 3.Bb5 a6 4.Ba4 Nf6 5.0-0 Nxe4 6.Nc3 – named after Viktor Knorre
- Koltanowski Gambit of the Italian Game – 1.e4 e5 2.Nf3 Nc6 3.Bc4 Bc5 4.0-0 Nf6 5.d4 – named after George Koltanowski
- Kondratiyev Variation of the French Defence – 1.e4 e6 2.d4 d5 3.Nc3 Bb4 4.Bd3 c5 5.exd5 Qxd5 6.Bd2 – named after Pavel Kondratiyev
- Konikowski Gambit of the Ruy Lopez – 1.e4 e5 2.Nf3 Nc6 3.Bb5 Bc5 4.c3 d5 – named after Jerzy Konikowski
- Konstantinopolsky Opening – 1.e4 e5 2.Nf3 Nc6 3.g3 – named after Alexander Konstantinopolsky
- Kopec System – 1.e4 c5 2.Bd3 – named after Danny Kopec

== L ==
- Lamb Defense of the Blackmar–Diemer Gambit – 1.d4 d5 2.e4 dxe4 3.Nc3 Nf6 4.f3 Nc6 named after F. Lamb
- Larsen's Opening – 1.b3 – named after Bent Larsen
- Lasker Defence of the Evans Gambit – 1.e4 e5 2.Nf3 Nc6 3.Bc4 Bc5 4.b4 Bxb4 5.c3 Ba5 6.0-0 d6 7.d4 Bb6 – named after Emanuel Lasker
- Lasker Defence of the Queen's Gambit Declined – 1.d4 d5 2.c4 e6 3.Nc3 Nf6 4.Bg5 Be7 5.e3 0-0 6.Nf3 h6 7.Bh4 Ne4 – named after Emanuel Lasker
- Leko Gambit of the Anti-Grünfeld – 1.d4 Nf6 2.c4 g6 3.f3 e5 – named after Peter Leko
- Leonardis Variation of the King's Pawn Opening – 1.e4 e5 2.d3 – named after James A. Leonard
- Leonhardt Variation of the Evans Gambit – 1.e4 e5 2.Nf3 Nc6 3.Bc4 Bc5 4.b4 Bxb4 5.c3 Ba5 6.d4 b5 – named after Paul Saladin Leonhardt
- Levitsky Attack – 1.d4 d5 2.Bg5 – named after Stepan Levitsky
- Levenfish Attack in the Sicilian Defence, Dragon Variation – 1.e4 c5 2.Nf3 d6 3.d4 cxd4 4.Nxd4 Nf6 5.Nc3 g6 6.f4 – named after Grigory Levenfish
- Levenfish Variation of the Grünfeld Defence – 1.d4 Nf6 2.c4 g6 3.Nc3 d5 4.Nf3 Bg7 5.Qb3 dxc4 6.Qxc4 0-0 7.e4 b6 – named after Grigory Levenfish
- Lisitsin Gambit of the Zukertort Opening – 1.Nf3 f5 2.e4 – named after Georgy Lisitsin
- Lolli Variation of the Two Knights Defense – 1.e4 e5 2.Nf3 Nc6 3.Bc4 Nf6 4.Ng5 d5 5.exd5 Nxd5 6.d4 – named after Giambattista Lolli
- Lucena Defence of the Ruy Lopez – 1.e4 e5 2.Nf3 Nc6 3.Bb5 Be7 – named after Luis Ramirez de Lucena
- Lundin Defense – 1.d4 Nc6 – named after Erik Lundin
- Lutikov Variation of the Grünfeld Defence – 1.d4 Nf6 2.c4 g6 3.Nc3 d5 4.f3 – named after Anatoly Lutikov
- Lutikov Variation of the Ruy Lopez – 1.e4 e5 2.Nf3 Nc6 3.Bb5 a6 4.Ba4 Nf6 5.0-0 Be7 6.Re1 b5 7.Bb3 0-0 8.c3 d6 9.Bc2 – named after Anatoly Lutikov

== M ==
- MacLeod Attack – 1.e4 e5 2.c3 – named after Nicholas MacLeod
- Makogonov System of the King's Indian Defence – 1.d4 Nf6 2.c4 g6 3.Nc3 Bg7 4.e4 d6 5.h3 – named after Vladimir Makogonov
- Makogonov Variation of the Grünfeld Defence – 1.d4 Nf6 2.c4 g6 3.Nc3 d5 4.e3 Bg7 5.Nf3 0-0 6.b4 – named after Vladimir Makogonov
- Maróczy Bind of the Sicilian Defence – 1.e4 c5 2.Nf3 Nc6 3.d4 cxd4 4.Nxd4 g6 5.c4 – named after Géza Maróczy
- Marshall Attack of the Ruy Lopez – 1.e4 e5 2.Nf3 Nc6 3.Bb5 a6 4.Ba4 Nf6 5.0-0 Be7 6.Re1 b5 7.Bb3 0-0 8.c3 d5 – named after Frank Marshall
- Marshall Defense to the Queen's Gambit – 1.d4 d5 2.c4 Nf6 – named after Frank Marshall
- Marshall Gambit in the Semi-Slav Defense – 1.d4 d5 2.c4 e6 3.Nc3 c6 4.e4 dxe4 5.Nxe4 Bb4+ 6.Bd2 – named after Frank Marshall
- Marshall Gambit of the Tarrasch Defense – 1.d4 d5 2.c4 e6 3.Nc3 c5 4.cxd5 exd5 5.e4 – named after Frank Marshall
- Marshall Variation of the Sicilian Defence – 1.e4 c5 2.Nf3 e6 3.d4 d5 – named after Frank Marshall
- Max Lange Attack of the Two Knights Defense – 1.e4 e5 2.Nf3 Nc6 3.Bc4 Nf6 4.d4 exd4 5.0-0 Bc5 6.e5 – named after Max Lange
- McCutcheon Variation of the French Defence – 1.e4 e6 2.d4 d5 3.Nc3 Nf6 4.Bg5 Bb4 – named after John Lindsay McCutcheon
- McDonnell Gambit of the King's Gambit – 1.e4 e5 2.f4 exf4 3.Nf3 g5 4.Bc4 g4 6.Nc3 – named after Alexander McDonnell
- Mieses Opening – 1.d3 – named after Jacques Mieses
- Mikenas Variation of the Modern Benoni – 1.d4 Nf6 2.c4 c5 3.d5 e6 4.Nc3 exd5 5.cxd5 d6 6.e4 g6 7.f4 Bg7 8.e5 – named after Vladas Mikėnas
- Miles Variation of the Queen's Indian Defense – 1.d4 Nf6 2.c4 e6 3.Nf3 b6 4.Bf4 – named after Tony Miles
- Moeller Attack of the Italian Game – 1.e4 e5 2.Nf3 Nc6 3.Bc4 Bc5 4.c3 Nf6 5.d4 cxd4 6.cxd4 Bb4+ 7.Nc3 Nxe4 8.0-0 Bxc3 9.d5 – named after Jorgen Moeller
- Monticelli Trap of the Bogo-Indian Defence – 1.d4 Nf6 2.c4 e6 3.Nf3 Bb4+ 4.Bd2 Bxd2+ 5.Qxd2 b6 6.g3 Bb7 7.Bg2 0-0 8.Nc3 Ne4 9.Qc2 Nxc3 10.Ng5 – named after Mario Monticelli
- Morozevich Variation of the French Defence – 1.e4 e6 2.d4 d5 3.Nd2 Be7 – named after Alexander Morozevich
- Morozevich Variation of the Slav Defence – 1.d4 d5 2.c4 c6 3.Nf3 Nf6 4.Nc3 dxc4 5.a4 Bf5 6.Ne5 Ndb7 7.Nxc4 Qc7 8.g3 e5 9.dxe5 Nxe5 10.Bf4 Nfd7 11.Bg2 g5 – named after Alexander Morozevich
- Morphy Defense to the Ruy Lopez – 1.e4 e5 2.Nf3 Nc6 3.Bb5 a6 – named after Paul Morphy
- Morphy Gambit of the French Defence – 1.e4 e6 2.d4 d5 3.Nh3 – named after Paul Morphy
- Muzio Gambit of the King's Gambit – 1.e4 e5 2.f4 exf4 3.Nf3 g5 4.Bc4 g4 5.0-0 gxf3 6.Qxf3 – named after Mutio d'Alessandro, a third-rate Neapolitan player, following a mistranslation by Jacob Sarratt of Alessandro Salvio

== N ==
- Nadanian Attack of the Queen's Pawn Opening – 1.d4 Nf6 2.Nf3 h6 3.c4 g5 – named after Ashot Nadanian
- Nadanian Variation of the Grünfeld Defence – 1.d4 Nf6 2.c4 g6 3.Nc3 d5 4.cxd5 Nxd5 5.Na4 – named after Ashot Nadanian
- Najdorf Variation of the Sicilian Defence – 1.e4 c5 2.Nf3 d6 3.d4 cxd4 4.Nxd4 Nf6 5.Nc3 a6 – named after Miguel Najdorf
- Napoleon Opening – 1.e4 e5 2.Qf3 – named after Napoleon Bonaparte
- Neumann Defense of the King's Gambit – 1.e4 e5 2.f4 exf4 3.Nf3 g5 4.h4 g4 5.Ne5 Nc6 – named after Gustav Neumann
- Nimzo-Indian Defence – 1.d4 Nf6 2.c4 e6 3.Nc3 Bb4 – named after Aron Nimzowitsch
- Nimzowitsch Defence – 1.e4 Nc6 – named after Aron Nimzowitsch
- Nimzowitsch Variation of the Sicilian Defense – 1.e4 c5 2.Nf3 Nf6 – named after Aron Nimzowitsch
- Noteboom Variation of the Semi-Slav Defence – 1.d4 d5 2.c4 e6 3.Nc3 c6 4.Nf3 dxc4 – named after Daniël Noteboom

== O ==
- O'Kelly Variation of the Sicilian Defence – 1.e4 c5 2.Nf3 a6 – named after Albéric O'Kelly de Galway
- Opočenský Opening (i.e. Trompowsky Attack) – 1.d4 Nf6 2.Bg5 – named after Karel Opočenský
- Opočenský Variation of the Grünfeld Defence – 1.d4 Nf6 2.c4 g6 3.Nc3 d5 4.e3 Bg7 5.Nf3 0-0 6.Bd2 – named after Karel Opočenský
- Opočenský Variation of the Sicilian Defence – 1.e4 c5 2.Nf3 d6 3.d4 cxd4 4.Nxd4 Nf6 5.Nc3 a6 6.Be2 – named after Karel Opočenský
- Owen's Defense – 1.e4 b6 – named after John Owen

== P ==
- Panov Attack of the Caro–Kann Defence – 1.e4 c6 2.d4 d5 3.exd5 cxd5 4.c4 – named after Vasily Panov
- Parham Attack – 1.e4 e5 2.Qh5 – named after Bernard Parham
- Paulsen Attack of the Petrov's Defence – 1.e4 e5 2.Nf3 Nf6 3.Nxe5 d6 4.Nc4 – named after Louis Paulsen
- Perenyi Attack of the Sicilian Defence – 1.e4 c5 2.Nf3 d6 3.d4 cxd4 4.Nxd4 Nf6 5.Nc3 e6 6.Be3 a6 7.g4 e5 8.Nf5 g6 9.g5 – named after Bela Perenyi
- Petrosian Variation of the King's Indian Defence – 1.d4 Nf6 2.c4 g6 3.Nc3 Bg7 4.e4 d6 5.Nf3 0-0 6.Be2 e5 7.d5 – named after Tigran Petrosian
- Petrosian Variation of the Queen's Indian Defense – 1.d4 Nf6 2.c4 e6 3.Nf3 b6 4.a3 – named after Tigran Petrosian
- Petrov Defense – 1.e4 e5 2.Nf3 Nf6 – named after Alexander Petrov
- Philidor Countergambit – 1.e4 e5 2.Nf3 d6 3.d4 f5 – named after François-André Danican Philidor
- Philidor Defence – 1.e4 e5 2.Nf3 d6 – named after François-André Danican Philidor
- Philidor Variation of the Bishop's Opening – 1.e4 e5 2.Bc4 Bc5 3.c3 – named after François-André Danican Philidor
- Pirc Defence – 1.e4 d6 2.d4 Nf6 3.Nc3 g6 – named after Vasja Pirc
- Polerio Defense of the King's Gambit – 1.e4 e5 2.f4 exf4 3.Nf3 g5 4.h4 g4 5.Ne5 Be7 – named after Giulio Cesare Polerio
- Pollock's Defense to the Ruy Lopez – 1.e4 e5 2.Nf3 Nc6 3.Bb5 Na5 – named after William Pollock
- Polugaevsky Variation of the Sicilian Defence – 1.e4 c5 2.Nf3 d6 3.d4 cxd4 4.Nxd4 Nf6 5.Nc3 a6 6.Bg5 e6 7.f4 b5 – named after Lev Polugaevsky
- Ponziani Opening – 1.e4 e5 2.Nf3 Nc6 3.c3 – named after Domenico Lorenzo Ponziani
- Popov Variation of the Ruy Lopez – 1.e4 e5 2.Nf3 Nc6 3.Bb5 a5 – named after Bulgarian correspondence player Georgi Alexandrov Popov
- Prie Attack of the Queen's Pawn Opening – 1.d4 d5 2.a3 – named after Éric Prié
- Puc Variation of the Nimzo-Indian Defence – 1.d4 Nf6 2.c4 e6 3.Nc3 Bb4 4.e3 c6 – named after Stojan Puc

== Q ==
- Quinteros Variation of the Sicilian Defence – 1.e4 c5 2.Nf3 Qc7 – named after Miguel Quinteros

== R ==
- Ragozin Defence of the Queen's Gambit – 1.d4 d5 2.c4 e6 3.Nf3 Nf6 4.Nc3 Bb4 – named after Viacheslav Ragozin
- Réti Opening – 1.Nf3 d5 2.c4 – named after Richard Réti
- Rice Gambit of the King's Gambit – 1.e4 e5 2.f4 exf4 3.Nf3 g5 4.h4 g4 5.Ne5 Nf6 6.Bc4 d5 7.exd5 Bd6 8.0-0 – named after Isaac Rice
- Richter–Rauzer Attack in the Sicilian Defense – 1.e4 c5 2.Nf3 d6 3.d4 cxd4 4.Nxd4 Nf6 5.Nc3 Nc6 6.Bg5 e6 7.Qd2 – named after Kurt Richter and Vsevolod Rauzer
- Richter–Veresov Attack – 1.d4 d5 2.Nc3 Nf6 3.Bg5 – named after Kurt Richter and Gavriil Veresov
- Riumin Variation of the Queen's Indian Defense – 1.d4 Nf6 2.c4 e6 3.Nf3 b6 4.g3 Bb7 5.Bg2 Bb4+ 6.Bd2 Be7 named after Nikolai Riumin
- Robatsch Defence – 1.e4 g6 2.d4 Bg7 – named after Karl Robatsch
- Rossolimo Variation of the Sicilian Defence – 1.e4 c5 2.Nf3 Nc6 3.Bb5 – named after Nicolas Rossolimo
- Rousseau Gambit – 1.e4 e5 2.Nf3 Nc6 3.Bc4 f5 4.d3 – named after Eugène Rousseau
- Rubinstein Variation of the Budapest Gambit – 1.d4 Nf6 2.c4 e5 3.dxe4 Ng4 4.Bf4 – named after Akiba Rubinstein
- Rubinstein Variation of the Four Knights Game – 1.e4 e5 2.Nf3 Nc6 3.Nc3 Nf6 4.Bb5 Nd4 – named after Akiba Rubinstein
- Rubinstein Variation of the French Defence – 1.e4 e6 2.d4 d5 3.Nc3 dxe4 – named after Akiba Rubinstein
- Rubinstein Variation of the Nimzo-Indian Defence – 1.d4 Nf6 2.c4 e6 3.Nc3 Bb4 4.e3 – named after Akiba Rubinstein
- Ruy Lopez – 1.e4 e5 2.Nf3 Nc6 3.Bb5 – named after Ruy López de Segura

== S ==
- Sämisch Variation of the King's Indian Defence – 1.d4 Nf6 2.c4 g6 3.Nc3 Bg7 4.e4 d6 5.f3 – named after Friedrich Sämisch
- Sämisch Variation of the Nimzo-Indian Defence – 1.d4 Nf6 2.c4 e6 3.Nc3 Bb4 4.a3 – named after Friedrich Sämisch
- Santasiere's Folly – 1.Nf3 Nf6 2.b4 – named after Anthony Santasiere
- Schallopp Defense of the King's Gambit – 1.e4 e5 2.f4 exf4 3.Nf3 Nf6 – named after Emil Schallopp
- Schlechter Gambit of the Bird's Opening – 1.f4 e5 2.fxe5 Nc6 – named after Carl Schlechter
- Schlechter–Rubinstein System of the Tarrasch Defence – 1.d4 d5 2.c4 e6 3.Nc3 c5 4.cxd5 exd5 5.Nf3 Nc6 6.g3 – named after Carl Schlechter and Akiba Rubinstein
- Schlechter Variation of the French Defence – 1.e4 e6 2.d4 d5 3.Bd3 – named after Carl Schlechter
- Schlechter Variation of the Grunfeld Defence – 1.d4 Nf6 2.c4 g6 3.Nc3 d5 4.e3 c6 – named after Carl Schlechter
- Schlechter Variation of the Slav Defence – 1.d4 d5 2.c4 c6 3.Nf3 Nf6 4.Nc3 g6 – named after Carl Schlechter
- Schliemann–Jaenisch Gambit of the Ruy Lopez – 1.e4 e5 2.Nf3 Nc6 3.Bb5 f5 – named after Carl Jaenisch and Adolph Schliemann
- Semi-Tarrasch Defense of the Queen's Gambit Declined – 1.d4 d5 2.c4 e6 3.Nc3 Nf6 4.Nf3 c5 – named after Siegbert Tarrasch
- Shabalov–Shirov Gambit of the Semi-Slav Defense – 1.d4 d5 2.c4 c6 3.Nf3 Nf6 4.Nc3 e6 5.e3 Nbd7 6.Qc2 Bd6 7.g4 – named after Alexander Shabalov and Alexei Shirov
- Short Variation of the Caro–Kann Defence Advance – 1.e4 c6 2.d4 d5 3.e5 Bf5 4.c3 e6 5.Be2 – named after Nigel Short
- Smith–Morra Gambit of the Sicilian Defence – 1.e4 c5 2.d4 cxd4 3.c3 dxc3 4.Nxc3 – named after Texas master Ken Smith and Morra
- Smyslov Variation of the Grünfeld Defence – 1.d4 Nf6 2.c4 g6 3.Nc3 d5 4.Nf3 Bg7 5.Qb3 dxc4 6.Qxc4 0-0 7.e4 Bg4 – named after Vasily Smyslov
- Smyslov Variation of the Ruy Lopez – 1.e4 e5 2.Nf3 Nc6 3.Bb5 a6 4.Ba4 Nf6 5.0-0 Be7 6.Re1 b5 7.Bb3 d6 8.c3 0-0 9.h3 h6 – named after Vasily Smyslov
- Snyder Variation of the Sicilian Defence – 1.e4 c5 2.b3 – named after Robert Snyder
- Sokolsky Opening – 1.b4 – named after Alexey Sokolsky
- Soldatenkov Variation of the King's Gambit – 1.e4 e5 2.f4 Bc5 3.Nf3 d6 4.fxe5 – named after Vasily Soldatenkov
- Soltis Variation of the Yugoslav Attack – 1.e4 c5 2.Nf3 d6 3.d4 cxd4 4.Nxd4 Nf6 5.Nc3 g6 6.Be3 Bg7 7.f3 0-0 8.Qd2 Nc6 9.Bc4 Bd7 10.0-0-0 Rc8 11.Bb3 Ne5 12.h4 h5 – named after Andrew Soltis
- Soultanbeieff Variation of Slav Defence – 1.d4 d5 2.c4 c6 3.Nf3 Nf6 4.Nc3 dxc4 5.a4 e6 Victor Soultanbeieff
- Sozin–Fischer Attack of the Sicilian Defence – 1.e4 c5 2.Nf3 Nc6 3.d4 cxd4 4.Nxd4 Nf6 5.Nc3 d6 6.Bc4 e6 7.Be3 Be7 8.Bb3 0-0 9.0-0 – named after Veniamin Sozin and Bobby Fischer
- Spielmann Variation of the Caro–Kann Defence – 1.e4 c6 2.Nc3 d5 3.Qf3 – named after Rudolph Spielmann
- Stamma Gambit of the King's Gambit – 1.e4 e5 2.f4 exf4 3.h4 – named after Philipp Stamma
- Staunton Gambit of the Dutch Defence – 1.d4 f5 2.e4 – named after Howard Staunton
- Steinitz Attack of the French Defence – 1.e4 e6 2.e5 – named after Wilhelm Steinitz
- Steinitz Defense of the Ruy Lopez – 1.e4 e5 2.Nf3 Nc6 3.Bb5 d6 – named after Wilhelm Steinitz
- Steinitz Gambit of the Vienna Game – 1.e4 e5 2.Nc3 Nc6 3.f4 – named after Wilhelm Steinitz
- Steinitz Variation of the Petrov Defense – 1.e4 e5 2.Nf3 Nf6 3.d4 – named after Wilhelm Steinitz
- Steinitz Variation of the Scotch Game – 1.e4 e5 2.Nf3 Nc6 3.d4 exd4 4.Nxd4 Qh4 5.Nc3 – named after Wilhelm Steinitz
- Steinitz Variation of the Sicilian Defence – 1.e4 c5 2.g3 – named after Wilhelm Steinitz
- Sveshnikov Variation of the Sicilian Defence – 1.e4 c5 2.Nf3 Nc6 3.d4 cxd4 4.Nxd4 Nf6 5.Nc3 e5 – named after Evgeny Sveshnikov
- Szén Variation of the Sicilian Defence – 1.e4 c5 2.Nf3 e6 3.d4 cxd4 4.Nxd4 Nc6 5.Nb5 – named after József Szén

== T ==
- Taimanov Variation of the Sicilian Defence – 1.e4 c5 2.Nf3 e6 3.d4 cxd4 4.Nxd4 Nc6 – named after Mark Taimanov
- Tal Gambit of the Sicilian Defence – 1.e4 c5 2.f4 d5 3.exd5 Nf6 – named after Mikhail Tal
- Tal Variation of the Caro–Kann Defence – 1.e4 c6 2.d4 d5 3.e5 Bf5 4.h4 – named after Mikhail Tal
- Tarrasch Defense – 1.d4 d5 2.c4 e6 3.Nc3 c5 – named after Siegbert Tarrasch
- Tarrasch Variation of the French Defence – 1.e4 e6 2.d4 d5 3.Nd2 – named after Siegbert Tarrasch
- Tennison Gambit – 1.Nf3 d5 2.e4 – named after Otto Tennison
- Torre Attack – 1.d4 Nf6 2.Nf3 e6 3.Bg5 – named after Carlos Torre
- Traxler Variation of the Two Knights Defence – 1.e4 e5 2.Nf3 Nc6 3.Bc4 Nf6 4.Ng5 Bc5 – named after Karel Traxler
- Trompowsky Attack – 1.d4 Nf6 2.Bg5 – named after Octavio Trompowsky

== U ==
- Ufimtsev Defence – 1.e4 d6 2.d4 Nf6 3.Nc3 g6 – named after Anatoly Ufimtsev
- Uhlmann–Szabo System
- Urusov Gambit – 1.e4 e5 2.Bc4 Nf6 3.d4 exd4 4.Nf3 – named after the Russian Prince Sergey Urusov

== V ==
- Van 't Kruijs Opening – 1.e3 – named after Maarten van 't Kruijs
- Velimirovic Attack of the Sicilian Defence – 1.e4 c5 2.Nf3 d6 3.d4 cxd4 4.Nxd4 Nf6 5.Nc3 e6 6.Bc4 Nc6 7.Be3 Be7 8.Qe2 – named after Dragoljub Velimirović
- Villemson Gambit of the King's Gambit – 1.e4 e5 2.f4 exf4 3.d4 – named after Martin Villemson
- Vinogradov Variation of the Ruy Lopez – 1.e4 e5 2.Nf3 Nc6 3.Bb5 Qe7 – named after Paul Vinogradov
- Vitolins Variation of the Sicilian Defence – 1.e4 c5 2.Nf3 d6 3.d4 cxd4 4.Nxd4 Nf6 5.Nc3 e6 6.Bb5+ – named after Alvis Vītoliņš

== W ==
- Wade Defence – 1.d4 d6 2.Nf3 Bg4 – named after Robert Wade
- Wagner Gambit of the Swiss Gambit – 1.f4 f5 2.e4 fxe4 3.Nc3 Nf6 4.g4 – named after Alexander Wagner
- Ware Defense – 1.e4 a5 – named after Preston Ware
- Ware Opening – 1.a4 – named after Preston Ware
- Winawer Variation of the French Defence – 1.e4 e6 2.d4 d5 3.Nc3 Bb4 – named after Simon Winawer
- Wolf Gambit of the French Defence – 1.e4 e6 2.d4 d5 3.Nc3 Nf6 4.Bg5 Bb4 5.Nge2
- Worrall Attack of the Ruy Lopez – 1.e4 e5 2.Nf3 Nc6 3.Bb5 a6 4.Ba4 Nf6 5.Qe2 – named after Thomas Herbert Worrall

== Z ==
- Zaitsev Gambit of the Grünfeld Defence – 1.d4 Nf6 2.c4 g6 3.Nc3 d5 4.h4 – named after Alexander Zaitsev
- Zaitsev Variation of the Ruy Lopez – 1.e4 e5 2.Nf3 Nc6 3.Bb5 a6 4.Ba4 Nf6 5.0-0 Be7 6.Re1 b5 7.Bb3 d6 8.c3 0-0 9.h3 Bb7 – named after Igor Zaitsev
- Zilbermints Gambit of the Englund Gambit – 1.d4 e5 2.dxe5 Nc6 3.Nf3 Nge7 – named after Lev Zilbermints
- Zukertort Opening – 1.Nf3 – Named after Johannes Zukertort
- Zvjaginsev Variation of the Sicilian Defence – 1.e4 c5 2.Na3 – named after Vadim Zvjaginsev

== See also ==
- Chess opening
- List of chess openings
- List of chess openings named after places
