= Trompowsky =

Trompowsky may refer to:

== People ==
- Edmund von Trompowsky (1851–1919), Baltic German architect
- Octávio Trompowsky (1897–1984), Brazilian chess player

== Other uses ==
- Trompowsky Attack, a chess opening
