= Kentucky Opening =

Kentucky Opening may refer to:

- Jerome Gambit, an unsound chess opening which is an off shoot of the Giuoco Piano.
- Danvers Opening, an unorthodox chess opening.
