= Keres Defence =

Position: a8 black rook, b8 black knight, c8 black bishop, d8 black queen, e8 black king, g8 black knight, h8 black rook, a7 black pawn, b7 black pawn, c7 black pawn, d7 black pawn, f7 black pawn, g7 black pawn, h7 black pawn, e6 black pawn, b4 black bishop, c4 white pawn, d4 white pawn, a2 white pawn, b2 white pawn, e2 white pawn, f2 white pawn, g2 white pawn, h2 white pawn, a1 white rook, b1 white knight, c1 white bishop, d1 white queen, e1 white king, f1 white bishop, g1 white knight, h1 white rook
- Moves: 1.d4 e6 2.c4 Bb4+
- ECO: A40
- Origin: Johann Löwenthal vs. Henry Thomas Buckle, 4th match game, London 1851
- Named after: Paul Keres
- Parent: Franco-Indian Defence
- Synonym(s): Kangaroo Defence

The Keres Defence (also known as the Kangaroo Defence) is a chess opening characterised by the moves:

1. d4 e6
2. c4 Bb4+

The opening is named after Estonian grandmaster Paul Keres.

== History ==
This opening was known since the 1840s and was played by Henry Thomas Buckle in his fourth match game with Johann Löwenthal, London 1851. The standard reply today, 3.Bd2, was recommended by Howard Staunton.

== Discussion ==
White can respond 3.Nc3, 3.Nd2, or 3.Bd2. The game often transposes to a Nimzo-Indian Defence, a Dutch Defence, a Queen's Gambit Declined, an English Defence, or a Bogo-Indian Defence. 3.Nc3 is likely to transpose into one of those openings: 3...Nf6 (Nimzo-Indian), 3...f5 (Dutch; Korn gives 3...Bxc3+ 4.bxc3 f5!, played by Buckle) 3...d5 (an unusual form of QGD), or 3...b6 (English). Black has the same options after 3.Nd2, except that 3...Nf6 4.Nf3 is a Bogo-Indian.

After 3.Bd2, Black can continue with 3...Bxd2+ into a line of the Bogo-Indian, and 3...a5 will also usually transpose to a Bogo-Indian when White plays Nf3. Or Black can allow White to play e4: 3...Qe7 4.e4 d5 (Black obtained a good game in Llanos–Hoffman, San Luis Clarin 1995 with 4...Nf6 5.a3 Bxd2+ 6.Nxd2 d6 7.Bd3 e5 8.d5 0-0) 5.Bxb4 (5.e5 Timman–Spraggett, Montpellier 1985) Qxb4+ 6.Qd2! Qxd2+ (if 6...Nc6 then 7.Nc3!) 7.Nxd2 with slight advantage for White.

== See also ==
- List of chess openings
- List of chess openings named after people
