= Wade Defence =

Position: a8 black rook, b8 black knight, d8 black queen, e8 black king, f8 black bishop, g8 black knight, h8 black rook, a7 black pawn, b7 black pawn, c7 black pawn, e7 black pawn, f7 black pawn, g7 black pawn, h7 black pawn, d6 black pawn, d4 white pawn, g4 black bishop, f3 white knight, a2 white pawn, b2 white pawn, c2 white pawn, e2 white pawn, f2 white pawn, g2 white pawn, h2 white pawn, a1 white rook, b1 white knight, c1 white bishop, d1 white queen, e1 white king, f1 white bishop, h1 white rook
- Moves: 1.d4 d6 2.Nf3 Bg4
- ECO: A41, A04
- Named after: Bob Wade
- Synonym: Hodgson Variation

The Wade Defence is a chess opening characterised by the initial moves:

1. d4 d6
2. Nf3 Bg4

The position can also arise from the move order 1.Nf3 d6 2.d4 Bg4.

== History ==
The opening is named after British International Master Bob Wade (1921–2008), originally from New Zealand, who played it for over 30 years. A number of grandmasters have often played the opening, including Julian Hodgson, Michael Adams, Vlastimil Jansa, and Tony Miles.

Jouni Yrjölä and Jussi Tella, in their book An Explosive Chess Opening Repertoire for Black, state that the opening:

[...] was played in 1938 by Rudolf Spielmann and used in the 1960s by Stein and Kavalek among others ... But the towering figure of the line is Julian Hodgson, who popularized it with many dynamic performances. Among the other practitioners, the contributions of Miles, Adams, Hickl and Jansa to the theoretical development of the line are worth mentioning.

In recognition of Hodgson's contributions, the authors refer to the opening as the "Hodgson Variation" rather than the "Wade Defence".

== Illustrative games ==
- Veselin Topalov vs. Michael Adams, Dortmund 1996:
  1. Nf3 d6 2. d4 Bg4 3. c4 Nd7 4. e4 Bxf3!? 5. Qxf3 g6 6. Nc3 Bg7 7. Qd1 c5! 8. d5 Bxc3+! 9. bxc3 Ngf6 10. f3 Qa5 11. Qb3 0-0-0 12. Be2 Rdg8! 13. Rb1 Qc7 14. Be3 Kb8 15. Qc2 g5 16. 0-0 Rg6 17. Rb2 Ka8 18. Rfb1 Rb8! 19. Kh1 h5 20. Qd2? (better is 20.Rb5 "with a more unclear position") g4 21. Qc2 gxf3 22. gxf3 Ne5 23. f4 Qc8 24. Bf1? (better is 24.f5 Rg7 25.Bh6 Rg8 26.Bf4 Ned7, although Black still has a large advantage) 24... Nxc4! (with a winning position) 25. Bxc4 Qh3 26. Rf1 Qxe3 27. Qd3 Qxe4+ 28. Qxe4 Nxe4 29. Bd3 f5 30. Bxe4 fxe4 31. Re2 a6 32. Rxe4 Rg7 33. a4 Ka7 34. Rfe1 Rf8 35. a5 Rff7 36. R1e3 Rg4 37. Rxe7 Rxe7 38. Rxe7 Rxf4 39. Re6 Rc4 40. Rxd6 Rxc3 41. Rh6 Rd3 42. Rxh5 c4 43. Rh4 c3 44. Rc4 Rxd5 45. Rxc3 Rxa5 46. h4 Rh5 47. Rh3 b5 48. Kg2 Kb6 49. Kf3 a5 50. Ke2 b4 51. Kd2 Kb5 52. Kc2 a4 53. Kb2 Rf5 54. h5 a3 55. Kb1 Rf1+ 56. Ka2 Ka4 57. Rh4 Rf2+ 58. Ka1 a2 59. h6 Ka3 0–1
- Reynaldo Vera vs. Boris Gulko, Lucerne 1993:
  1. d4 d6 2. Nf3 Bg4 3. c4 Nd7 4. Nc3 e5 5. e3 c6 6. h3 Bh5 7. Be2 Be7 8. 0-0 f5!? (8...Ngf6 is more solid) 9. c5? (better is 9.e4! f4 10.c5!) e4! 10. cxd6 Bxd6 11. Nd2 Bxe2 12. Qxe2 Ngf6 13. Nc4 Bc7 14. b3?! b5! 15. Nd2 Qe7 16. Rd1 0-0 17. Nf1 Nb6 18. Bb2 Nfd5 19. a4 f4! 20. exf4 Nxf4 21. Qxe4 Qg5 22. Qf3 Rae8 23. Qg4? (23.Re1) Qxg4 24. hxg4 b4 25. Na2 Ne2+ 26. Kh1 Nd5 27. f3 Re6 28. Bc1 Rff6 29. g5 Rf5 30. Nh2 Bxh2 0–1 (31.Kxh2 Rh6+! 32.gxh6 Rh5#)

== See also ==
- List of chess openings
- List of chess openings named after people
