= 1 E3 =

1 E3 may refer to:

- 1000 (number), the natural number following 999 and preceding 1001
- The chess opening move 1.e3, Van 't Kruijs Opening
