= Franco-Indian Defence =

Position: a8 black rook, b8 black knight, c8 black bishop, d8 black queen, e8 black king, f8 black bishop, g8 black knight, h8 black rook, a7 black pawn, b7 black pawn, c7 black pawn, d7 black pawn, f7 black pawn, g7 black pawn, h7 black pawn, e6 black pawn, d4 white pawn, a2 white pawn, b2 white pawn, c2 white pawn, e2 white pawn, f2 white pawn, g2 white pawn, h2 white pawn, a1 white rook, b1 white knight, c1 white bishop, d1 white queen, e1 white king, f1 white bishop, g1 white knight, h1 white rook
- Moves: 1.d4 e6
- ECO: A40
- Origin: 19th century
- Named after: French Defence; Indian Defence; Bernhard Horwitz
- Parent: Queen's Pawn Game
- Synonym(s): Horwitz Defence

The Franco-Indian Defence (also Horwitz Defence) is a chess opening defined by the moves:

1. d4 e6

This response to White's 1.d4 is so named "because it may lead to the French Defence, or to one of the Indian Defences; it may, however, take a different course." Alternatively, author Eric Schiller has proposed the name "Horwitz Defence", after the German chess master and writer Bernhard Horwitz (1807–1885), who played it against Daniel Harrwitz between 1849 and 1852.

The opening has little independent significance and is likely to transpose into other openings. English grandmaster Simon Williams often uses 1.d4 e6 as a way of playing for the Dutch Defence while avoiding the Staunton Gambit (1.d4 f5 2.e4!?). One of the few independent lines is the Keres Defence (1.d4 e6 2.c4 Bb4+), where White usually plays 3.Bd2, avoiding a transposition to the Nimzo-Indian Defence; however, transpositions to other openings such as the Bogo-Indian Defence are still possible.

The Encyclopaedia of Chess Openings code for the Franco-Indian Defence is A40.

== Common transpositions ==
- 2.e4 (French Defence)
- 2.c4
  - 2...d5 (Queen's Gambit Declined)
  - 2...Nf6 (Nimzo-Indian Defence, Queen's Indian Defence, Bogo-Indian Defence etc)
  - 2...f5 (Dutch Defence)
  - 2...b6 (English Defence)
  - 2...Bb4+ (Keres Defence, may transpose to several openings)
  - 2...c5
    - 3.d5 (Benoni Defence)
    - 3.Nf3 (English Opening, Symmetrical Defence)
- 2.Nf3 leads to a similar range of transpositional possibilities while avoiding 2...Bb4+
- 2.g3 may also transpose into the above openings, as well as the Catalan Opening
- 2.Bf4 is usually played with the intention of playing a London System

== See also ==
- List of chess openings
- List of chess openings named after people
