= Napoleon Opening =

Chess opening

Position: a8 black rook, b8 black knight, c8 black bishop, d8 black queen, e8 black king, f8 black bishop, g8 black knight, h8 black rook, a7 black pawn, b7 black pawn, c7 black pawn, d7 black pawn, f7 black pawn, g7 black pawn, h7 black pawn, e5 black pawn, e4 white pawn, f3 white queen, a2 white pawn, b2 white pawn, c2 white pawn, d2 white pawn, f2 white pawn, g2 white pawn, h2 white pawn, a1 white rook, b1 white knight, c1 white bishop, e1 white king, f1 white bishop, g1 white knight, h1 white rook
- Moves: 1.e4 e5 2.Qf3
- ECO: C20
- Named after: Napoleon Bonaparte
- Parent: Open Game

The Napoleon Opening is an irregular chess opening starting with the moves:

1. e4 e5
2. Qf3

As with the similar Danvers Opening (2.Qh5), White hopes for the scholar's mate (2...Nc6 3.Bc4 Bc5?? 4.Qxf7#), but Black can easily avoid the attack.

== History ==
The Napoleon Opening is named after the French general and emperor Napoleon Bonaparte, who had a deep love of chess but was said to be a mediocre player. The name came into use after mid-nineteenth century publications reported that he played this opening in an 1809 game that he lost to The Turk, a fake chess automaton operated at the time by chess master and theoretician Johann Allgaier.

== Assessment ==
The Napoleon is a weak opening because it develops the white queen prematurely and subjects it to attack, and deprives the white king's knight of its best development square.

== See also ==
- List of chess openings
- List of chess openings named after people
