= Englund Gambit =

Position: a8 black rook, b8 black knight, c8 black bishop, d8 black queen, e8 black king, f8 black bishop, g8 black knight, h8 black rook, a7 black pawn, b7 black pawn, c7 black pawn, d7 black pawn, f7 black pawn, g7 black pawn, h7 black pawn, e5 black pawn, d4 white pawn, a2 white pawn, b2 white pawn, c2 white pawn, e2 white pawn, f2 white pawn, g2 white pawn, h2 white pawn, a1 white rook, b1 white knight, c1 white bishop, d1 white queen, e1 white king, f1 white bishop, g1 white knight, h1 white rook
- Moves: 1.d4 e5
- ECO: A40
- Named after: Fritz Englund
- Parent: Queen's Pawn Game
- Synonym: Charlick Gambit

The Englund Gambit is a chess opening that starts with the moves:

1. d4 e5?!

Black's idea is to avoid the traditional closed queen's pawn games and create an open game with tactical chances, but at the cost of a pawn. The gambit is considered weak; Boris Avrukh writes that 1...e5 "seems to me the worst possible reply to White's first move". It is almost never seen in top-level play, although Paul Keres once tried it. The gambit is occasionally seen in amateur games and in correspondence chess, and the 3...Qe7 version of the gambit was frequently used by Henri Grob.

Black has numerous ways to continue after 1.d4 e5 2.dxe5. Black can offer to exchange the d-pawn for White's e-pawn with 2...d6, arguing that after White captures with exd6, ...Bxd6 will offer Black a lead in development to compensate for the pawn. After the continuation 2...Nc6 3.Nf3, Black may round up the e5-pawn with 3...Qe7, intending to meet 4.Bf4 with the disruptive 4...Qb4+, and ensuring that White's only way to maintain the extra pawn is to expose the queen with 4.Qd5, but in subsequent play the queen can prove to be awkwardly placed on e7. 3...Nge7 intending 4...Ng6 is another way to round up the e5-pawn, but requires two tempi, while Black can also offer to exchange the f-pawn with 3...f6, or 3...Bc5 intending a subsequent ...f6, with similar play to the Blackmar–Diemer Gambit except that Black has one tempo less.

The gambit can be considered an inferior relative of the Budapest Gambit and Albin Countergambit, as by comparison with those gambits, White has not weakened the b4-square with c2–c4, and may be able to put that tempo to better use in order to avoid giving away any key squares. Accordingly, with careful play White should be able to obtain a greater advantage against the Englund than against the Budapest and Albin, against all approaches by Black. However, since the Budapest and Albin rely upon White continuing with 2.c4, and can thus be avoided by continuations such as 2.Nf3 (when 2...e5? can be met by 3.Nxe5 in either case), it is easier for exponents of the Englund Gambit to get their opening on the board and avoid getting into a typical queen's pawn type of game.

== History ==
1.d4 e5 is also known as the Charlick Gambit after Henry Charlick (1845–1916), the second Australian chess champion, who introduced the 2...d6 line in the early 1890s. The main line Englund Gambit (2...Nc6, 3...Qe7) was introduced by Kārlis Bētiņš (1867–1943), who also established the Latvian Gambit. The Swedish player Fritz Englund (1871–1933) sponsored a thematic tournament from late 1932 to early 1933 in which all games had to begin with the position after 4.Qd5; the 1.d4 e5 gambit complex was later named after him.

== Main variations ==
=== Main line ===
Position: a8 black rook, c8 black bishop, e8 black king, f8 black bishop, g8 black knight, h8 black rook, a7 black pawn, b7 black pawn, c7 black pawn, d7 black pawn, e7 black queen, f7 black pawn, g7 black pawn, h7 black pawn, c6 black knight, d5 white queen, e5 white pawn, f3 white knight, a2 white pawn, b2 white pawn, c2 white pawn, e2 white pawn, f2 white pawn, g2 white pawn, h2 white pawn, a1 white rook, b1 white knight, c1 white bishop, e1 white king, f1 white bishop, h1 white rook

Stockholm Variation: 3.Nf3 Qe7 4.Qd5

Most common today is 2.dxe5 Nc6 3.Nf3 Qe7 4.Bf4 Qb4+ 5.Bd2 Qxb2 6.Nc3 Bb4 7.Rb1 Qa3. White can try to keep the extra pawn with 4.Qd5!?, the Stockholm Variation. Black can try a queenside fianchetto with 4...b6, or attempt to regain the pawn with 4...h6, but neither of those lines provide enough compensation for the pawn. Thus, Black usually challenges the e5-pawn immediately with 4...f6, when play continues 5.exf6 Nxf6 6.Qb3. Black does not get enough compensation with the delayed queenside fianchetto 6...b6, so the main line continues 6...d5. After 6...d5, 7.Nc3 Bd7!, threatening 8...Na5, leading to complications and good play for Black (e.g. 8.Bg5 Na5 or 8.Qxb7 Rb8 9.Qxc7 Qc5). After the stronger responses 7.Bf4 and 7.Bg5 (intending 7...Bd7 8.e3), however, while Black retains some compensation for the pawn, White keeps an edge.

Position: a8 black rook, c8 black bishop, e8 black king, f8 black bishop, g8 black knight, h8 black rook, a7 black pawn, b7 black pawn, c7 black pawn, d7 black pawn, f7 black pawn, g7 black pawn, h7 black pawn, c6 black knight, e5 white pawn, b4 black queen, f4 white bishop, f3 white knight, a2 white pawn, b2 white pawn, c2 white pawn, e2 white pawn, f2 white pawn, g2 white pawn, h2 white pawn, a1 white rook, b1 white knight, d1 white queen, e1 white king, f1 white bishop, h1 white rook

Main line: 3.Nf3 Qe7 4.Bf4 Qb4+

Instead, White often allows Black to regain the pawn at the cost of lagging development. The main line runs 4.Bf4 Qb4+ 5.Bd2 (5.Nc3!? is perfectly playable, as 5...Qxf4 is well met by 6.Nd5!, while 5...Qxb2 6.Bd2 transposes to the main line) 5...Qxb2 6.Nc3! White must avoid the notorious trap 6.Bc3?? Bb4!, which wins for Black after 7.Bxb4 Nxb4 or 7.Qd2 Bxc3 8.Qxc3 Qc1#.

After 6.Nc3, 6...Nb4? is refuted by 7.Nd4 c6 8.a4. The main line instead continues 6...Bb4 7.Rb1 Qa3 8.Rb3 Qa5 9.e4 Nge7 or 9.a3 Bxc3 10.Bxc3 Qc5, when White has some advantage due to the lead in development, but Black is not without chances due to the loose white pieces and shattered white pawn structure. However, in 2006 Bücker pointed out that 8.Nd5!, previously analysed by Grob as leading only to an unclear position, has been improved for White, and Black has yet to find a good response. Avrukh also considers this very strong, analyzing 8...Bxd2+ 9.Qxd2 Qxa2 10.Rd1 Kd8 11.Ng5 Nh6 12.e6! d6 (12...Qa5? 13.e7+! Ke8 14.Qxa5 Nxa5 15.Nxc7+ wins) 13.exf7 Rf8 14.Nxc7 Kxc7 15.Qxd6+ Kb6 16.Ne4! Qxc2 (or 16...Bf5 17.Nc3 Qxc2 18.Nd5+) 17.Nd2 Rxf7 18.Rb1+ Qxb1+ 19.Nxb1 with "a decisive advantage". Stefan Bücker offers 13...Qa5 for Black but concludes that White is clearly better after 14.c3 Rf8 15.Nxh7 Rxf7 16.Ng5 Rf8 17.g3 Ne5 18.Bg2 Nhf7 19.Nxf7+ Rxf7 20.Qd4. Avrukh also considers 8...Ba5 9.Rb5 Bxd2+ (9...a6? 10.Rxa5 Nxa5 11.Nxc7+) 10.Qxd2 Kd8 11.Ng5 (the traditional reply 11.e4 may allow Black a playable game after 11...a6!? according to Bücker) 11...Nh6 12.f4!? a6 13.Rb3 Qxa2 14.Nc3 Qa1+ 15.Rb1 Qa5 16.e3 when Black is "close to losing", for example 16...Re8 17.Bc4 Nxe5 18.fxe5 Qxe5 19.Bxf7! Qxg5 20.Bxe8 Kxe8 21.Nd5 Qe5 22.0-0 and "White wins." Bücker also considers 9.e4!? to be a strong alternative to 9.Rb5, leading to a clear advantage for White. Black therefore sometimes tries 4...d6 instead, continuing 5.exd6 Qf6 6.Qc1 (or 6.e3, returning the pawn).

White's other major try for advantage is 4.Nc3 Nxe5 5.e4, securing a lead in development and leaving Black's queen awkwardly placed on e7. Stefan Bücker recommends 5...Nf6 6.Bg5 c6 7.Nxe5 Qxe5 8.f4 Qe6, with a playable game but some advantage for White. Viktor Korchnoi won a miniature in a 1978 simultaneous exhibition with 4.Nc3 Nxe5 5.Nd5 Nxf3+ 6.gxf3 Qd8 7.Qd4 d6 8.Bg5!, but according to Bücker Black gets a playable game with 8...f6 9.Bd2 c6 10.Nf4 Qb6.

=== Blackburne–Hartlaub Gambit ===
Position: a8 black rook, b8 black knight, c8 black bishop, d8 black queen, e8 black king, f8 black bishop, g8 black knight, h8 black rook, a7 black pawn, b7 black pawn, c7 black pawn, f7 black pawn, g7 black pawn, h7 black pawn, d6 black pawn, e5 white pawn, a2 white pawn, b2 white pawn, c2 white pawn, e2 white pawn, f2 white pawn, g2 white pawn, h2 white pawn, a1 white rook, b1 white knight, c1 white bishop, d1 white queen, e1 white king, f1 white bishop, g1 white knight, h1 white rook

Blackburne–Hartlaub Gambit: 2.dxe5 d6

The Blackburne–Hartlaub Gambit, 2...d6, was Charlick's original idea to avoid the closed openings, aiming for compensation for a pawn after 3.exd6 Bxd6. A sample continuation is 4.Nf3 Nf6 5.Bg5 h6 6.Bh4, when White remains a pawn up with some advantage. White can also delay the immediate 3.exd6, playing 3.Nf3 first, when after 3...Bg4, 4.e4 Nd7 transposes into a gambit line of the Philidor Defence played by Blackburne. Black gets partial compensation for the pawn after 5.exd6 Bxd6 6.Be2 Ngf6 7.Nc3 Qe7. White obtains a large advantage, however, after 2...d6 3.Nf3 Bg4 4.Bg5! Qd7 5.exd6 Bxd6 6.Nbd2.

=== Soller Gambit ===
Position: a8 black rook, c8 black bishop, d8 black queen, e8 black king, f8 black bishop, g8 black knight, h8 black rook, a7 black pawn, b7 black pawn, c7 black pawn, d7 black pawn, g7 black pawn, h7 black pawn, c6 black knight, f6 black pawn, e5 white pawn, f3 white knight, a2 white pawn, b2 white pawn, c2 white pawn, e2 white pawn, f2 white pawn, g2 white pawn, h2 white pawn, a1 white rook, b1 white knight, c1 white bishop, d1 white queen, e1 white king, f1 white bishop, h1 white rook

Soller Gambit: 2.dxe5 Nc6 3.Nf3 f6

The Soller Gambit, 2...Nc6 3.Nf3 f6, was named after Karl Soller. The immediate 2...f6 is sometimes seen as well, when 3.Nf3 Nc6 transposes, but 3.e4! Nc6 4.Bc4 gives White a large advantage. In the Soller Gambit proper, International Master Gary Lane recommends 4.exf6 Nxf6 5.Bg5. In this line Black gets partial compensation via 5...h6!, e.g. 6.Bh4 Bc5 (or 6...g5 at once) 7.e3 g5 or 6.Bxf6 Qxf6 7.c3 Bc5, although White keeps some advantage.

White can also return the pawn via 4.e4, securing the better chances. Then after 4...fxe5 5.Bc4, 5...Nf6 6.Ng5! leads to complications that are very good for White, but 5...d6 may be an improvement.

Detailed analysis of the Soller Gambit in print has been restricted to two German language works by FM Stefan Bücker from the 1980s and 1990s. In recent years, however, International Master Kamran Shirazi has played the gambit on over 1,400 occasions in blitz and bullet games at Lichess. Shirazi has diverged from Bücker's work by favouring 1.d4 e5 2.dxe5 Nc6 3.Nf3 f6 4.exf6 Nxf6 5.Bg5 d5!? and well as 5.Nc3 d5!? and 5.e3 d5!?. In each case this results in play where Black is effectively adopting the Blackmar-Diemer Gambit a move down. Bücker had advocated 5.Bg5 h6 and 5.Nc3 Bc5, generally preferred variations with ...d6, and considered 5...d5 lines to be dubious. However, Shirazi's games suggest that 5...d5 variations are playable in high level blitz chess.

=== Felbecker Gambit ===
Position: a8 black rook, c8 black bishop, d8 black queen, e8 black king, g8 black knight, h8 black rook, a7 black pawn, b7 black pawn, c7 black pawn, d7 black pawn, f7 black pawn, g7 black pawn, h7 black pawn, c6 black knight, c5 black bishop, e5 white pawn, f3 white knight, a2 white pawn, b2 white pawn, c2 white pawn, e2 white pawn, f2 white pawn, g2 white pawn, h2 white pawn, a1 white rook, b1 white knight, c1 white bishop, d1 white queen, e1 white king, f1 white bishop, h1 white rook

Felbecker Gambit: 2.dxe5 Nc6 3.Nf3 Bc5

The Felbecker Gambit, 3...Bc5, usually followed by ...f6, is a variant on the Soller Gambit approach, when again Black may get partial compensation in such lines as 4.Nc3 f6 5.exf6 Nxf6 6.Bg5 d6 7.e3 h6, but 4.e4 is also critical, when Black's best is 4...Qe7 as 4...f6 5.Bc4! gives White a large advantage.

=== Zilbermints Gambit ===
The Zilbermints Gambit, 2...Nc6 3.Nf3 Nge7, was named after the American chess player Lev D. Zilbermints who had extensive analysis published on the line in Blackmar Diemer Gambit World issues 61–63. German FIDE Master Stefan Bücker provided further analysis in Kaissiber 5 and 6. The idea is to play ...Ng6 and win the pawn back.

Gary Lane recommends the response 4.Bf4. After 4...Ng6 5.Bg3, Zilbermints recommends either 5...Bc5 or 5...Qe7 6.Nc3 Qb4, when White's main responses are 7.Rb1, 7.Qd2 and 7.a3. After 7.Rb1, a possible continuation is 7...Qa5 8.Qd5 Bb4 9.Qxa5 Bxa5 10.e3 0-0 11.Bd3 Re8 12.Bxg6 Bxc3+ 13.bxc3 fxg6, when Black's superior pawn structure compensates for the lost pawn, while both 7.Qd2 and 7.a3 lead to considerable complications. An alternative for White is 5.e3, but Black may get some compensation for the pawn after 5...d6. If 4.Bg5, then Black obtains a good game via 4...h6 5.Bh4 g5 6.Bg3 Nf5.

Thus 4.Nc3 is the most critical response, when 4...Ng6 is ineffective in view of 5.Bg5! Be7 6.Bxe7 Qxe7 7.Nd5, so Black may need to fall back upon 4...h6.

=== Alternatives for White ===
White can decline the Englund Gambit in a number of ways, although doing so would be inaccurate. 2.d5 is sometimes seen, but leaves Black with a good game after 2...Bc5, while 2.e3 can be met by 2...exd4 3.exd4 d5 transposing to the Exchange Variation of the French Defence, and in addition Black can avoid 3...d5 and simply develop with a good game. 2...Nc6 and 2...e4 may also be playable. After 2.Nf3, Black gets a good game with 2...exd4 3.Nxd4 d5, preparing ...c5, and 2...e4 3.Ne5 d6 4.Nc4 d5 is also good for Black. also after 2...d6, 3.e4 offers black to regain the pawn the endgame will be more comfortable for white.

After 2.dxe5 Nc6, instead of 3.Nf3, White can also defend the e5-pawn with 3.Bf4, when Bücker suggests either 3...g5 followed by 4...Bg7, or 3...f6 hoping to get an improved version of the Soller Gambit. 3.f4 is sometimes seen, but Black has reasonable chances after 3...f6 or 3...d6. White can also transpose to a line of the Nimzowitsch Defence with 3.e4.

== See also ==
- List of chess openings
- List of chess openings named after people
