= Clemenz Opening =

Position: a8 black rook, b8 black knight, c8 black bishop, d8 black queen, e8 black king, f8 black bishop, g8 black knight, h8 black rook, a7 black pawn, b7 black pawn, c7 black pawn, d7 black pawn, e7 black pawn, f7 black pawn, g7 black pawn, h7 black pawn, h3 white pawn, a2 white pawn, b2 white pawn, c2 white pawn, d2 white pawn, e2 white pawn, f2 white pawn, g2 white pawn, a1 white rook, b1 white knight, c1 white bishop, d1 white queen, e1 white king, f1 white bishop, g1 white knight, h1 white rook
- Moves: 1.h3
- ECO: A00
- Named after: Hermann Clemenz

The Clemenz Opening is a chess opening beginning with the move:

1. h3

This opening is named after Hermann Clemenz (1846–1908), an Estonian player. It is considered an irregular opening and is classified under the code A00 (irregular first moves by White) in the Encyclopaedia of Chess Openings.

== Description ==
Like Anderssen's Opening, 1.a3, 1.h3 is a time-wasting move, as it makes no claim on the central squares, nor does it aid development. It also leads to a slight weakening of White's kingside, albeit not as severely as Grob's Attack (1.g4) or Barnes Opening (1.f3). Since there is no need for White to make such a time-wasting first move, it is among the rarest of the 20 possible first moves. Nevertheless, IM Michael Basman has experimented with 1.h3, usually following it up with 2.g4 (transposing to the Grob), or 2.a3 followed by a quick c2–c4, a line that has been dubbed the "Creepy Crawly". The Creepy Crawly is also known as the Global Opening.

== Black responses ==
Black has a number of playable responses, the most common being 1...d5 and 1...e5, which stake out a claim for central space. Another response, 1...b6 (or even 1...b5), intends to fianchetto a bishop to pressure White's weakened pawns and forestall a White kingside expansion with g2–g4.

1...f5 is probably not Black's best reply to 1.h3, since White can then play 2.d4, transposing to a sharp line against the Dutch Defense once tried by Viktor Korchnoi.

== See also ==
- List of chess openings
- List of chess openings named after people

== Bibliography ==
- Benjamin, Joel; Schiller, Eric (1987). Unorthodox Openings. Macmillan Publishing Company. pp. 102–03. ISBN 0-02-016590-0.
- Dunnington, Angus (2000). Winning Unorthodox Openings. Everyman Chess. ISBN 978-1-85744-285-4.
- Hooper, David; Whyld, Kenneth (1996) [First pub. 1992]. The Oxford Companion to Chess (2nd ed.). Oxford University Press. ISBN 0-19-280049-3.
- Schiller, Eric (2002). Unorthodox Chess Openings (Second ed.). Cardoza. p. 108. ISBN 1-58042-072-9.
