= Balogh Defense =

Chess opening

Position: a8 black rook, b8 black knight, c8 black bishop, d8 black queen, e8 black king, f8 black bishop, g8 black knight, h8 black rook, a7 black pawn, b7 black pawn, c7 black pawn, e7 black pawn, g7 black pawn, h7 black pawn, d6 black pawn, f5 black pawn, d4 white pawn, e4 white pawn, a2 white pawn, b2 white pawn, c2 white pawn, f2 white pawn, g2 white pawn, h2 white pawn, a1 white rook, b1 white knight, c1 white bishop, d1 white queen, e1 white king, f1 white bishop, g1 white knight, h1 white rook
- Moves: 1.e4 d6 2.d4 f5 or; 1.d4 f5 2.e4 d6 or; 1.d4 d6 2.e4 f5
- ECO: B07 or A82 or A41
- Named after: János Balogh
- Parent: Pirc Defense or; Staunton Gambit or; Pillsbury Defense
- Synonym: Balogh Countergambit

The Balogh Defense (also known as the Balogh Countergambit) is an unusual chess opening beginning with the moves:

1. e4 d6
2. d4 f5

It may also arise by transposition from the Staunton Gambit of the Dutch Defense, 1.d4 f5 2.e4, if Black declines the gambit with 2...d6. Or it may arise by 1.d4 d6 (the Pillsbury Defense) 2.e4 f5.

The opening is rarely seen today because it weakens Black's kingside somewhat and often results in a backward e-pawn or a hole on e6 after Black's bishop is exchanged. Hikaru Nakamura used the line to beat grandmaster Eugene Perelshteyn in the HB Global Chess Challenge 2005.

== History ==
The defense is named after János Balogh (1892–1980), who was a Hungarian International Master of correspondence chess, and a strong master at over-the-board chess, who analysed it in Wiener Schachzeitung, 1930. The opening variation 1.e4 d6 2.d4 f5 was first published by Cozio in the first volume of his 1740 treatise. The line was played in game 5 of the Kieseritzky–Horowitz match in 1846.

== Assessment ==
International Correspondence Chess Master Keith Hayward has written a series of articles arguing that the defense, though risky, is playable.

Most books, if they mention the Balogh Defense at all, say that it is refuted by 3.exf5 Bxf5 4.Qf3 Qc8 5.Bd3. Hayward recommends the move 5...Bg4 in response. An alternative line is 3.Nc3 Nf6 4.Bd3. Balogh liked 4...Nc6, but Hayward considers 5.exf5! Nxd4 6.g4 difficult for Black, instead recommending 4...fxe4, with the continuation 5.Nxe4 Nxe4 6.Bxe4.

== See also ==
- List of chess openings
- List of chess openings named after people
