= Blumenfeld Gambit =

Position: a8 black rook, b8 black knight, c8 black bishop, d8 black queen, e8 black king, f8 black bishop, h8 black rook, a7 black pawn, d7 black pawn, f7 black pawn, g7 black pawn, h7 black pawn, e6 black pawn, f6 black knight, b5 black pawn, c5 black pawn, d5 white pawn, c4 white pawn, f3 white knight, a2 white pawn, b2 white pawn, e2 white pawn, f2 white pawn, g2 white pawn, h2 white pawn, a1 white rook, b1 white knight, c1 white bishop, d1 white queen, e1 white king, f1 white bishop, h1 white rook
- Moves: 1.d4 Nf6 2.c4 c5 3.d5 e6 4.Nf3 b5
- ECO: E10
- Named after: Benjamin Blumenfeld
- Parent: Benoni Defense
- Synonym: Blumenfeld Countergambit

The Blumenfeld Gambit, also known as the Blumenfeld Countergambit, is a chess opening beginning with the moves:

1. d4 Nf6
2. c4 c5
3. d5 e6
4. Nf3 b5

The gambit is a variation of the Benoni Defense. Many other move orders are possible. The following common alternative move order occurs when White avoids the Nimzo-Indian Defence (2...e6 3.Nc3 Bb4) by playing 3.Nf3:

1. d4 Nf6
2. c4 e6
3. Nf3 c5
4. d5 b5

Black sacrifices a wing pawn to establish an imposing centre with pawns on c5, d5 and e6. Possible continuations include 5.dxe6, 5.Bg5, 5.e4, and 5.a4, with 5.Bg5 being most frequent.

The opening is named after the Russian master Benjamin Blumenfeld, and was later played by World Champion Alexander Alekhine.

The Encyclopaedia of Chess Openings classifies the Blumenfeld Gambit under code E10 (1.d4 Nf6 2.c4 e6 3.Nf3).

== Strategy ==
The natural development of the bishops to b7 and d6, combined with the half-open f-file for a rook, tend to facilitate Black's play on the kingside. White, on the other hand, will typically look to counter in the centre by playing e4 at some point, while the additional queenside pawn also offers some initiative on that side of the board.

The move ...b5 also occurs in the Benko Gambit (3...b5), which can transpose to the Blumenfeld Gambit after 4.Nf3 e6, though White usually does not play 4.Nf3.

== Blumenfeld Gambit Accepted: 5.dxe6 ==
Position: a8 black rook, b8 black knight, c8 black bishop, d8 black queen, e8 black king, f8 black bishop, h8 black rook, a7 black pawn, g7 black pawn, h7 black pawn, e6 black pawn, f6 black knight, b5 white pawn, c5 black pawn, d5 black pawn, f3 white knight, a2 white pawn, b2 white pawn, e2 white pawn, f2 white pawn, g2 white pawn, h2 white pawn, a1 white rook, b1 white knight, c1 white bishop, d1 white queen, e1 white king, f1 white bishop, h1 white rook

5.dxe6 fxe6 6.cxb5 d5

Accepting the gambit with 5.dxe6 fxe6 6.cxb5 is a common continuation, though slightly less common than 5.Bg5. It was played in the game Kan–Goldenov, 1946. Black's main move is then 6...d5, leading to a position where White has an extra pawn but Black has achieved central domination. White's most common seventh moves are 7.Nc3, 7.g3, and 7.e3. 6...a6 is an alternative for Black, inviting 7.bxa6 Bxa6, though White may decline to exchange, most often with 7.e3.

== Blumenfeld Gambit Declined: 5.Bg5 ==
Position: a8 black rook, b8 black knight, c8 black bishop, d8 black queen, e8 black king, f8 black bishop, h8 black rook, a7 black pawn, d7 black pawn, f7 black pawn, g7 black pawn, h7 black pawn, f6 black knight, b5 black pawn, c5 black pawn, d5 white pawn, g5 white bishop, f3 white knight, a2 white pawn, b2 white pawn, e2 white pawn, f2 white pawn, g2 white pawn, h2 white pawn, a1 white rook, b1 white knight, d1 white queen, e1 white king, f1 white bishop, h1 white rook

5.Bg5 exd5 6.cxd5

5.Bg5 is the most common move for White and was seen in the game Vaganian–K. Grigorian, 1971. The most common continuation is 5...exd5 6.cxd5, after which 6...h6 and 6...d6 are both common. 6...h6 tends to continue 7.Bxf6 Qxf6 8.Qc2. 6...d6 is typically followed by 7.e4 a6 8.a4 Be7. Black also has the option of 5...b4, where play usually proceeds with 6.e4 d6.

== White's fifth-move alternatives ==
- 5.e4 is the third most common move, though significantly less common than 5.Bg5 and 5.dxe6. It has been played by Akiba Rubinstein.
- 5.a4 was seen in the game Rubinstein–Spielmann, 1922.

== See also ==
- List of chess openings
- List of chess openings named after people
