= Lisitsin Gambit =

Chess opening

Position: a8 black rook, b8 black knight, c8 black bishop, d8 black queen, e8 black king, f8 black bishop, g8 black knight, h8 black rook, a7 black pawn, b7 black pawn, c7 black pawn, d7 black pawn, e7 black pawn, g7 black pawn, h7 black pawn, f5 black pawn, e4 white pawn, f3 white knight, a2 white pawn, b2 white pawn, c2 white pawn, d2 white pawn, f2 white pawn, g2 white pawn, h2 white pawn, a1 white rook, b1 white knight, c1 white bishop, d1 white queen, e1 white king, f1 white bishop, h1 white rook
- Moves: 1.Nf3 f5 2.e4
- ECO: A04
- Origin: Lisitsin vs. Riumin, Moscow 1931
- Named after: Georgy Lisitsin
- Parent: Zukertort Opening

The Lisitsin Gambit is a chess opening characterised by the moves:

1. Nf3 f5
2. e4

2.e4 is a very counter-intuitive move, as after 2...fxe4 White does not get to make a developing move but must move an already developed piece. Practice has shown that the knight landing on g5 is hard to chase away, however, and creates certain tactical threats (more than simply Nxe4!) that compensate for the lost pawn. The gambit is described as "enterprising and probably sound" in The Oxford Companion to Chess.

The opening is registered in the Encyclopaedia of Chess Openings under the code A04.

== History ==
The gambit became widely known in 1931 when it was played (probably for the first time in official matches) by Georgy Lisitsin against Nikolai Riumin in their fight at Moscow in the first round of the USSR Chess Championship. Lisitsin employed it against Mikhail Botvinnik in the 1933 Leningrad Masters tournament.

== Theory ==
The opening can alternatively be transposed to the Dutch Defence, and it is quite easy to learn the gambit lines in relation to the lines of the Dutch Defence.

White can also delay the gambit for one move, playing first 2.d3 wherein Black often continues with 2...d6 (or any other move, depending on the variation of the Dutch that Black is trying to apply). Then White can try the gambit by playing 3.e4. This delayed variation is referred by some researchers as the Improved Lisitsin Gambit.

== Black continuations ==
- 2...e5 transposes to the notorious Latvian Gambit. This may actually be a good practical choice for someone who knows nothing about the Lisitsin, as it gives Black a greater initiative.
- 2...fxe4 is the only way to challenge White's idea. Wilhelm Steinitz said "the way to refute a gambit is to accept it." After 3.Ng5 there can follow:
  - 3...d5 4.d3 Qd6 (if Black tries to retain the extra pawn at any cost, he might be punished, e.g.: 4...exd3? 5.Bxd3 Nf6 6.Bxh7 Nxh7 7.Qh5+ Kd7 8.Nf7 Qe8? 9.Qxd5#) 5.Nc3 h6;
  - 3...Nf6 4.d3 e3 (4...d5 5.dxe4 h6 6.Nf3, or 4...e5 5.dxe4 Bc5 6.Bc4) 5.Bxe3 e5;
  - 3...e5!? (Cvetkovic) 4.d3 e3 5.Bxe3 Nc6;

== See also ==
- List of chess openings
- List of chess openings named after people
