= Henry Charlick =

Australian chess player

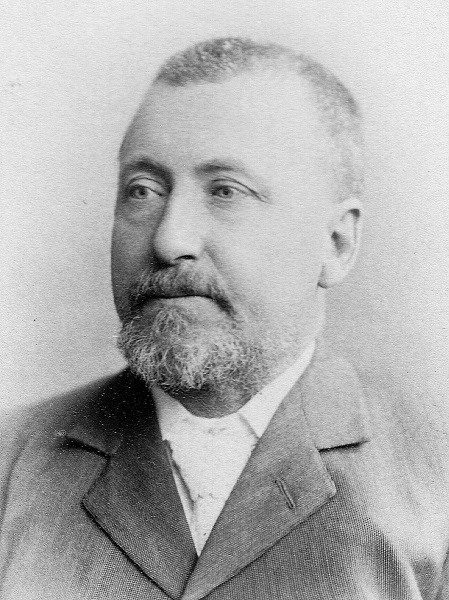
- Henry Charlick in 1898

Personal information
- Born: Henry Charlick; 8 July 1845 London, England
- Died: 26 July 1916 (aged 71) Adelaide, Australia

Chess career
- Country: Australia

Henry Charlick (8 July 1845 in London, England – 26 July 1916 in Adelaide, Australia) was a leading Australian chess master in the 1880s. He won the second Australian Chess Championship at Adelaide 1887 with 7½ points out of 9 games, ahead of reigning champion Frederick Karl Esling (7 points) and George H. D. Gossip (6½). Charlick scored 6/8 in the third championship at Melbourne 1888, tying for first with William Crane, Jr., ahead of William Tullidge (5½), but narrowly lost the playoff to Crane (1 win, 2 losses, 1 draw).

== History ==
Henry was born in 1845 on Tottenham Court road, London, to Richard Charlick (died 1868) and his wife Janet, née Wilson (died 1876), who emigrated to South Australia on the Calphurnia, arriving in April 1849. He learned the chess moves at the age of 15 at the Adelaide Mechanics' Institute and read all the books he could find on the subject and played against every possible opponent. Blessed with a singularly retentive memory, he was soon winning every game. Before the age of 18 he had, blindfolded, simultaneously beaten two strong players. He was influential in the inauguration of the first inter-colonial competition, between Victoria and South Australia in 1864 or 1865.

In a demonstration at the Adelaide Town Hall given by J. H. Blackburne in 1885 against twenty-odd players, Charlick, who conducted two games against the English champion, won one in five moves, and drew the other; Blackburne's only reverses. At the chess congress at Adelaide in 1887 he was the first to be awarded Australian Chess Champion. The following year that honour went to William Crane (14 April 1851 – 23 April 1920) of New South Wales. He retired from active competition in 1893, in part to encourage younger players. He was for many years Secretary of the Adelaide Chess Club (industrialist A. M. Simpson was a longtime president), and edited the Chess column in the Adelaide Observer. His style of play has been compared with that of Paul Morphy as distinct from that of Wilhelm Steinitz.

Of quiet, generous and unassuming demeanor, Charlick was employed for most of his life at the offices of the South Australian Register, first as a reporter then in the commercial department. He married Jane Connors in 1869; they had four sons: Henry Walter Charlick (1870–1940), Leslie Stanford Charlick (1876– ), Raymond Charlick (1883–1950), Geoffrey Astles Charlick (1884–1927) and two daughters: Ella Charlick (1881–1947) and Alice Charlick (1888–1965). Geoffrey killed himself by drinking lysol. He had been suffering from severe disabilities as a result of World War I injuries. Raymond's son Geoffrey Raymond Charlick (1912–1976) was a linguist, scholar and author.

Charlick had a younger brother John Charlick (1854 – 15 January 1879) who showed great aptitude as a chess player, perhaps of equal strength, but died young. He is remembered as a composer of chess problems.

== Charlick Gambit ==
In the early 1890s, Charlick introduced the dubious chess opening 1.d4 e5?!, which was sometimes (back then) called the Charlick Gambit. Charlick's idea was to meet 2.dxe5 with the gambit 2...d6 "with the object of preventing White from playing a close game." Today, 1.d4 e5 is usually called the Englund Gambit, and the 2.dxe5 d6 offshoot that Charlick pioneered is usually called the Blackburne–Hartlaub Gambit. Modern theory considers 2...d6 even more dubious than the main line 2...Nc6 3.Nf3 Qe7, since White obtains a large advantage after 2...d6 3.Nf3 Bg4 4.Bg5! Qd7 5.exd6 Bxd6 6.Nbd2.

== Illustrative games ==
Following are two games showing Charlick's attacking style of play.

Apperly vs. Charlick, 1894

Position: h1 white rook, f1 white bishop, e1 white king, c1 white bishop, a1 white rook, g2 white pawn, f2 white pawn, c2 black bishop, b2 white pawn, a2 white pawn, h3 white pawn, e3 white pawn, c3 white pawn, b3 white knight, h4 white knight, e4 black knight, a4 white queen, g6 black queen, d6 black bishop, c6 black knight, h7 black pawn, g7 black pawn, f7 black pawn, c7 black pawn, b7 black pawn, a7 black pawn, e8 black rook, d8 black rook, c8 black king

Position after 13.Nh4

Position: h1 white rook, f1 white bishop, d1 black bishop, c1 white bishop, a1 white rook, g2 white pawn, e2 white king, b2 white pawn, a2 white pawn, h3 white pawn, g3 black bishop, e3 white pawn, c3 white pawn, b3 white knight, h4 white knight, e4 black knight, a4 white queen, c6 black knight, h7 black pawn, g7 black pawn, f7 black pawn, c7 black pawn, b7 black pawn, a7 black pawn, e8 black rook, d8 black rook, c8 black king

Final position

- Apperly–Charlick, corr., Australia 1894:
  1. d4 e5 2. dxe5 d6 Charlick's favorite gambit. 3. Bf4 Nc6 4. exd6 Qf6 5. Bc1 Bxd6 6. c3 Bf5 7. e3 0-0-0 8. Nd2 Qg6 9. h3 Nf6 10. Ngf3 Rhe8 11. Qa4 Bc2 12. Nb3 Ne4 13. Nh4 Qg3! 14. fxg3 Bxg3+ 15. Ke2 Bd1# 0–1 White resigned.
- Charlick–William Crane, Jr., Australian Championship playoff 1888:
  1. e4 e5 2. Nf3 Nc6 3. Nc3 Nf6 4. Bb5 Bb4 5. d3 d6 6. 0-0 0-0 7. Ne2 Ne7 8. Ng3 Ng6 9. Bg5 Be6 10. c3 Bc5 11. Nh5 c6 12. Ba4 Bg4 13. Nxf6+ gxf6 14. Bh6 Re8 15. h3 Bd7 16. b4 Bb6 17. Bb3 Be6 18. Nh2 f5 19. exf5 Bxf5 20. Qf3 Be6 21. Ng4 Bxb3 22. Nf6+ Kh8 23. Nxe8 Bc2 24. Qxf7 1–0 Black resigned.
