= Maarten van 't Kruijs =

Dutch chess player and organist (1813–1885)

Personal information
- Born: 18 February 1813 Uithoorn, Netherlands
- Died: 30 March 1885 (aged 72) Amsterdam, Netherlands

Chess career
- Country: Netherlands

Maarten van 't Kruijs (Dutch pronunciation: [ˈmaːrtə(ɱ) vɑn ət ˈkrœys]; 18 February 1813 – 30 March 1885) was a Dutch chess player and organist. In the international chess world, Van 't Kruijs is primarily known for being the namesake of the Van 't Kruijs Opening, 1.e3. Living in a time before the World Chess Championship, he was considered the strongest chess player in the Netherlands, and he was considered one of the strongest in the world at the time by his contemporaries, including Adolf Anderssen. He was a well-developed player who won various Dutch chess championships between 1851 and 1878. Despite such high praise, little is known of Van 't Kruijs due to his timidity and overt life of privacy.

== Early life ==
Little is known of the early life of Van 't Kruijs. It can be established, however, that he was born in Uithoorn on 18 February 1813. It is generally believed that he was a well-to-do Dutch man who learned chess sometime as a child. However, there are very few sources that reveal biographical details about Van 't Kruijs, so most of this information is unknown.

== Chess career ==
Van 't Kruijs appears to have become affiliated with the United Amsterdam Chess Society sometime prior to 1851, when the club held the first Dutch chess 'championship' game. According to testimony from witnesses and other chess scholars of the time who were in attendance, Van 't Kruijs won rather handily in these tournaments. A few years later, a shuffle chess tournament was held in Amsterdam, which Van 't Kruijs also won. According to the long-running Dutch chess magazine of the time, Sissa, he had proven that shuffle chess was more emphatically expressed and that, “It is a field still undeveloped, to which labor we politely invite all our chess aficionados.”

On an 1861 visit to the Netherlands, the Prussian grandmaster Adolf Anderssen played a game against him and was so impressed by Van 't Kruijs' skill that he counted him among the ten strongest chess players in the world. It was around this time that he developed his prominent opening move and the one that would give him the most fame, that being the Van 't Kruijs Opening, 1.e3. One of the first times the opening was played was in 1863, in a game between Horing and Paulsen.

Van 't Kruijs continued to dominate Dutch chess, culminating in his victory at the 1878 Dutch Chess Championship. He then retired due to poor health.

== Death and legacy ==
Maarten Van 't Kruijs died on 30 March 1885 in Amsterdam. His eponymous opening continues to be played in various levels of chess, and his legacy jumpstarted Dutch chess. His theories were considered ahead of their time, though mostly considered part of Romantic chess.
