= Igor Glek =

Russian-Belgian chess grandmaster (born 1961)

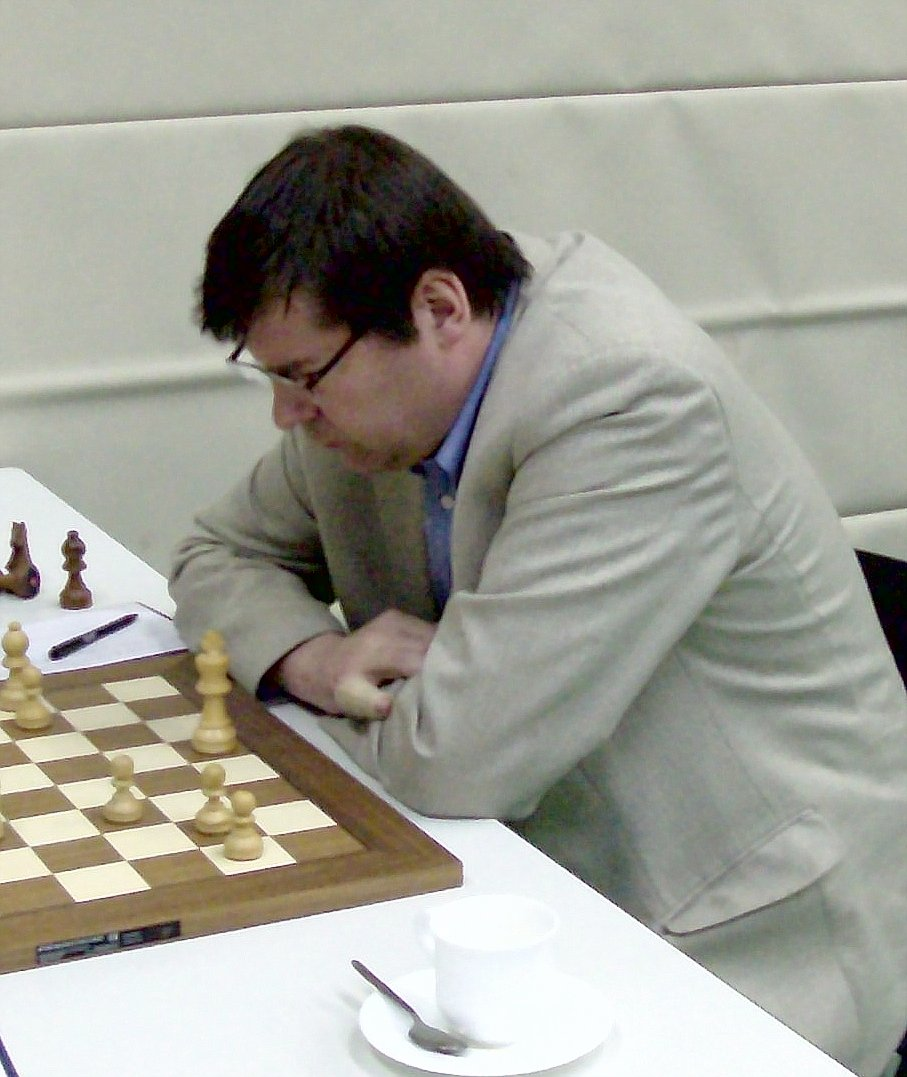
- Glek in 2008

Personal information
- Born: Igor Vladimirovich Glek; 7 November 1961 (age 65) Moscow, Soviet Union

Chess career
- Country: Soviet Union → Russia; Germany (2000–2022); Belgium (since 2022)
- Title: Grandmaster (1990)
- FIDE rating: 2433 (November 2026)
- Peak rating: 2670 (July 1996)
- Peak ranking: No. 12 (July 1996)

Igor Vladimirovich Glek (Russian: Игорь Владимирович Глек; born 7 November 1961) is a Russian chess player, trainer, writer and theorist. He was awarded the title of Grandmaster by FIDE in 1990.

== Biography ==
Glek was born in Moscow. Completing his University of Moscow engineering/economics qualification in 1983, he worked as an economist until 1986 and followed this with two years of military service in the Soviet Army. From 1989, he was able to concentrate on chess, becoming first a professional player, then a grandmaster in 1990. In 1994 he moved to Essen, Germany.

Over the years, he has coached many talented young players and has been a regular writer on chess. He is perhaps most commonly known for his contributions to the New In Chess (NIC) series of opening surveys and also the Secrets Of Opening Surprises series of books (also published by NIC), which fall under the general editorship of Jeroen Bosch. Known for his extensive and very creative opening repertoire, many enthusiasts find Glek's games and advice on offbeat opening lines invaluable. As a player, he mostly opens with e4 as white and prefers the King's Indian, French Defence and Dutch Defence as Black. A variation of the Classical King's Indian Defence, characterized by the move 7 ... Na6, is named after him, as is a variation of the Four Knights Game (4.g3).

In tournaments, he has been a winner of over 100 international events, including the 1990 World Open at Philadelphia, the 1998 Vienna Open, the 1999 Utrecht Open and the 2002 Zwolle Open (jointly with Mikhail Gurevich and others). Notable too, were his second place at Cappelle-la-Grande 1998 and joint second at the 9th Ordix Open (behind Viktor Bologan), a rapid chess event held in 2002. At the peak of his playing strength (1996) he was ranked world number 12 with an Elo rating of 2670.

He has also had many years of success in team chess tournaments, primarily for his long-time club side Norilsky Nikel of Norilsk, as well as being a member of the silver medal-winning Russian team at the 1997 European Team Chess Championship.

Nowadays, he spends most of his time organising chess. He is a co-founder of the ACP (Association of Chess Professionals) and was voted a board member in 2004. During 2005 and 2006, he was technical director of the Moscow Open International Chess Festival, became a member of the FIDE Committee for youth and junior events and was elected President of the WLCT (World League of Chess Tournaments).

In 2010, he was awarded the titles of FIDE Senior Trainer and International Organizer by FIDE.

== Controversies ==
In December 2024, Glek's account on Chess.com was banned for violating the platform's Fair Play Policy. He allegedly used external help from engines.
