= English Defence =

Position: a8 black rook, b8 black knight, c8 black bishop, d8 black queen, e8 black king, f8 black bishop, g8 black knight, h8 black rook, a7 black pawn, c7 black pawn, d7 black pawn, f7 black pawn, g7 black pawn, h7 black pawn, b6 black pawn, e6 black pawn, c4 white pawn, d4 white pawn, a2 white pawn, b2 white pawn, e2 white pawn, f2 white pawn, g2 white pawn, h2 white pawn, a1 white rook, b1 white knight, c1 white bishop, d1 white queen, e1 white king, f1 white bishop, g1 white knight, h1 white rook
- Moves: 1.d4 e6 2.c4 b6 or 1.d4 b6
- ECO: A40
- Origin: P. N. Wallis
- Parent: Franco-Indian Defence

The English Defence is a chess opening characterised by the moves:

1. d4 e6
2. c4 b6

== History ==
The English Defence was rarely seen in master play before the Second World War, but early instances can be found in the games of Henry Bird, Gyula Breyer, Aron Nimzowitsch and Richard Réti. In the late 1940s and early 1950s the Leicester player P. N. Wallis investigated the potential of the opening, and in the 1970s it was taken up by several leading English players such as Tony Miles and Raymond Keene. During this period Viktor Korchnoi employed the English Defence successfully in game 6 of his Candidates semi-final match against Lev Polugaevsky at Évian 1977 (see below).

The English Defence remains rare in grandmaster play, but has been used (often as a surprise weapon) by players such as Nigel Short, Alexander Morozevich, Hikaru Nakamura, Alexander Grischuk and Richard Rapport. The most frequent high-level practitioners have been Jon Speelman, Edvins Kengis and, more recently, Georg Meier.

== Description ==
After 1.d4 e6 2.c4 b6, Black allows White to form a broad pawn centre with 3.e4, which Black will then attempt to undermine in hypermodern style with moves such as ...Bb7, ...Bb4, and sometimes even ...Qh4 and/or ...f5.

Common lines are as follows:

1.d4 e6 2.c4 b6 3.e4 Bb7 4.Bd3 Bb4+ 5.Nc3 f5 6.Qe2 Nf6.

1.d4 e6 2.c4 b6 3.e4 Bb7 4.Bd3 Nc6 5.Ne2 Nb4 6.Nbc3 NxBd3 7.QxNd3 Ne7 8.0-0 d6.

1.d4 e6 2.c4 b6 3.e4 Bb7 4.Nc3 Bb4 5.f3 (or Bd3, transposing to the first line above) f5.

If White decides against playing e4, for example by opting for 3.Nc3, play will likely transpose to a form of b6 Nimzo-Indian Defence, for example via 3...Bb7 4.Nf3 Bb4 5.Qc2 Nf6.

White can also transpose to a King's Pawn opening with 2.e4, in which case Black will typically proceed with either 2...d5 (French Defence) or 2...b6 (Owen's Defence).

The English Defence can also arise via a 1.d4 b6 move order, especially at club level where some players adopt 1...b6/2...Bb7 as a universal system.

== Example games ==
- Lev Polugaevsky vs. Viktor Korchnoi, Évian 1977
  1.d4 e6 2.c4 b6 3.e4 Bb7 4.Qc2 Qh4 5.Nd2 Bb4 6.Bd3 f5 7.Nf3 Bxd2+ 8.Kf1 Qh5 9.Bxd2 Nf6 10.exf5 Bxf3 11.gxf3 Nc6 12.Bc3 0-0 13.Re1 Qh3+ 14.Ke2 Rae8 15.Kd1 e5 16.dxe5 Nxe5 17.Be2 Nxf3 18.Qd3 Rxe2 19.Rxe2 Qg2 20.Rhe1 Nxe1 21.Kxe1 Qxh2 22.Re7 Qg1+ 23.Ke2 Qg4+ 24.Ke1 h5 25.Qg3 Qxg3 26.fxg3 Rf7 27.Bxf6 gxf6 28.Re8+ Kg7 29.Kf2 Kh6 30.b4 Kg5 31.Ra8 Kxf5 32.Rxa7 d6 33.a4 Ke6 34.a5 bxa5 35.Rxa5 f5 36.c5 Rh7 37.cxd6 cxd6 38.b5 h4 39.gxh4 Rxh4 40.Ra8 Rb4 41.Rb8 Kd5 42.Kf3 Rb3+ 43.Kf4 Kc5 44.Rc8+ Kxb5 45.Kxf5 Re3 46.Kf4 Re1 47.Rd8 Kc5 48.Rc8+ Kd4 49.Kf3 d5 50.Kf2 Re5 51.Ra8 Kc3 52.Ra3+ Kb4 53.Ra1 d4 54.Rc1 d3 55.Rc8 d2 56.Rb8+ Kc3 57.Rc8+ Kd3 58.Rd8+ Kc2 59.Rc8+ Kd1 60.Rc7 Rf5+ 61.Kg2 Ke2 62.Re7+ Kd3 63.Rd7+ Ke3 64.Re7+ Kd4 65.Rd7+ Rd5 0–1
- Susan Polgar vs. Jon Speelman, Netherlands 1993
  1.d4 e6 2.c4 Bb4+ 3.Nc3 b6 4.e4 Bb7 5.d5 Qe7 6.Be2 Nf6 7.f3 exd5 8.cxd5 c6 9.dxc6 Nxc6 10.Nh3 d5 11.exd5 0-0-0 12.Bg5 Rhe8 13.Bxf6 gxf6 14.Nf4 Qe5 15.Qd2 Bxc3 16.bxc3 Nb4 17.Kf2 Nxd5 18.Nd3 Nxc3 0–1
- Lucian Filip vs. Igor Kovalenko, Iasi 2014
  1.d4 e6 2.c4 b6 3.g3 Bb7 4.Nf3 Bb4+ 5.Bd2 Bxf3 6.exf3 Bxd2+ 7.Qxd2 d5 8.cxd5 Qxd5 9.Nc3 Qxf3 10.Rg1 Qh5 11.Nb5 Na6 12.Qc2 Ne7 13.Qa4 0-0 14.Qxa6 Qxh2 15.Rg2 Qh6 16.Qa3 Nf5 17.g4 Nh4 18.Rg3 c6 19.g5 Qg6 20.Bd3 Nf5 21.Nd6 Qh5 22.Bxf5 Qh1+ 23.Ke2 Qxa1 24.Bc2 Qc1 25.Qd3 g6 26.Ne4 Rad8 27.Rh3 Kg7 28.Rxh7+ 1–0

== See also ==
- List of chess openings
- List of chess openings named after places
