= Staunton Gambit =

Chess opening

Position: a8 black rook, b8 black knight, c8 black bishop, d8 black queen, e8 black king, f8 black bishop, g8 black knight, h8 black rook, a7 black pawn, b7 black pawn, c7 black pawn, d7 black pawn, e7 black pawn, g7 black pawn, h7 black pawn, f5 black pawn, d4 white pawn, e4 white pawn, a2 white pawn, b2 white pawn, c2 white pawn, f2 white pawn, g2 white pawn, h2 white pawn, a1 white rook, b1 white knight, c1 white bishop, d1 white queen, e1 white king, f1 white bishop, g1 white knight, h1 white rook
- Moves: 1.d4 f5 2.e4
- ECO: A82–A83
- Named after: Howard Staunton
- Parent: Dutch Defence

The Staunton Gambit is a chess opening characterised by the moves:

1. d4 f5 (the Dutch Defence)
2. e4!?

White sacrifices a pawn for quick development, with the idea of launching an attack against Black's kingside, which has been somewhat weakened by 1...f5. Black can decline the gambit with 2...d6, transposing to the Balogh Defence, but accepting the pawn with 2...fxe4 is considered stronger.

Black can avoid the Staunton Gambit by playing 1...e6 before f5. The drawback of this move order is that it allows White to transpose to the French Defence on move 2 (an opening that normally starts with 1.e4), in which case playing the Dutch is no longer an option.

Although the Staunton Gambit was once a feared weapon for White, it is rarely played today, since defensive techniques have been developed to neutralise it, and White scores only about 50 percent. The Encyclopaedia of Chess Openings codes for Staunton Gambit are A82 and A83.

== Staunton Gambit Accepted: 2...fxe4 ==
After 2...fxe4, play usually proceeds 3.Nc3 Nf6.

=== Main line: 4.Bg5 ===
The main line continues 4.Bg5, first played by Howard Staunton against Bernhard Horwitz in London, 1846.

After 4.Bg5, a common trap is 4...d5? 5.Bxf6 exf6 6.Qh5+ g6 7.Qxd5 Qxd5 8.Nxd5 when White has regained his pawn, and since his knight is attacking the pawns on both c7 and f6, will come out a pawn ahead. Instead, Black usually tries to develop quickly and fortify his kingside, giving back the pawn if necessary, with 4...Nc6 5.d5 (White can regain the pawn with 5.Bxf6 exf6 6.Nxe4, but after 6...Qe7, White has no good way to defend the knight. Everything except for 7.Qe2 allows ...d5 or ...f5, winning a piece, while after the forcing 7.Qe2 Nxd4 8.Qd3 d5 9.Qxd4 Qxe4+ 10.Qxe4 dxe4, Black has an extra pawn and the two bishops for no compensation, and should win with best play.) 5...Ne5 6.Qd4 Nf7. 6.Qe2 is a modern alternative.

=== 4.f3 ===
White can also try 4.f3 in the style of the Blackmar–Diemer Gambit, whereupon White gets good compensation after 4...exf3. So Black generally plays 4...d5! 5.fxe4 dxe4. Black can also try 4...e3, returning the pawn in order to hinder White's development.

=== 4.g4?! ===
4.g4?! (the Bayonet Attack or Tartakower Variation) fails to provide enough compensation after 4...h6!

== See also ==
- List of chess openings
- List of chess openings named after people
