= Hodgson Attack =

Position: a8 black rook, b8 black knight, c8 black bishop, d8 black queen, e8 black king, f8 black bishop, g8 black knight, h8 black rook, a7 black pawn, b7 black pawn, c7 black pawn, e7 black pawn, f7 black pawn, g7 black pawn, h7 black pawn, d5 black pawn, g5 white bishop, d4 white pawn, a2 white pawn, b2 white pawn, c2 white pawn, e2 white pawn, f2 white pawn, g2 white pawn, h2 white pawn, a1 white rook, b1 white knight, d1 white queen, e1 white king, f1 white bishop, g1 white knight, h1 white rook
- Moves: 1.d4 d5 2.Bg5
- ECO: D00
- Named after: Julian Hodgson
- Parent: Queen's Pawn Game
- Synonym(s): Pseudo-Trompowsky; Levitsky Attack; Queen's Bishop Attack; Bishop Attack

The Hodgson Attack (also called the Pseudo-Trompowsky, Levitsky Attack after Stepan Levitsky, Queen's Bishop Attack, and Bishop Attack,) is a chess opening that begins with the moves:

1. d4 d5
2. Bg5

Strategically, the bishop on g5 exerts an annoying influence where it pins Black's e-pawn and is ready to meet 2...Nf6 with 3.Bxf6, giving up the bishop pair in exchange for saddling Black with doubled pawns. White's aim is to provoke weaknesses in the kingside position while it engages the bishop.

Modern Chess Openings considers the line a variation of the Trompowsky Attack, although that term is usually reserved for the moves 1.d4 Nf6 2.Bg5. The Encyclopedia of Chess Openings covers 2.Bg5 in chapter D00.

== Development ==
Although the opening was tested by Preston Ware in the 1880s, the namesake of the opening is the English grandmaster Julian Hodgson who studied and played the opening extensively, finding several new ideas and gaining an understanding of the arising positions that yielded him successful results with the line. The Hodgson Attack was a very rare line until the 1980s, when several players including Michael Adams and Tony Miles tried the opening, but the opening remains a sideline compared to the Queen's Gambit (2.c4).

== Black responses ==
Black has several options, for instance falling in with White's idea after 2...Nf6 3.Bxf6 transposes into a variation of the Trompowsky Attack that is playable. Moves like 2...c5, 2...g6, 2...c6 and even chasing the bishop with 2...f6 are also possible. An unusual response is 2...Bg4 (the Welling Variation). A solid line is to chase the bishop with 2...h6 3.Bh4 c6, where Black will play 4...Qb6 on the next move, attacking the b2-pawn and thus taking advantage of a drawback in White's system, namely the bishop's absence from defending the queenside.
