= Georgy Lisitsin =

Russian chess player

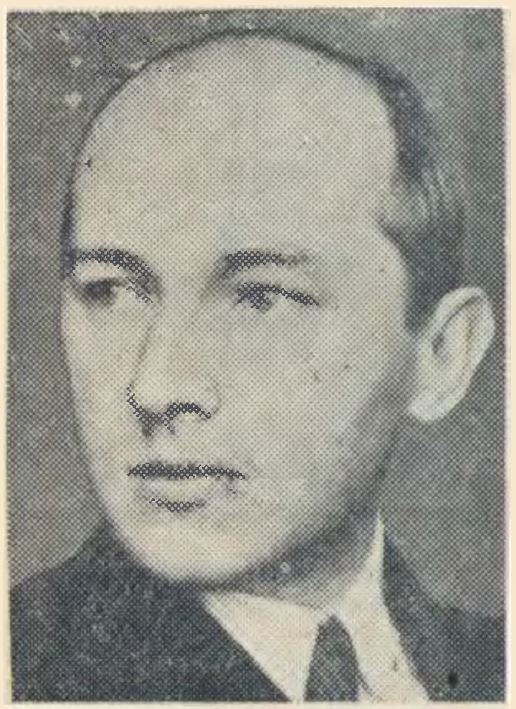
Georgy Lisitsin

Georgy Mikhailovich Lisitsin or Lisitsyn (Russian: Гео́ргий Миха́йлович Лиси́цын; 11 October 1909 – 20 March 1972) was a Soviet chess master from Leningrad. After high school he entered the Leningrad Industrial Institute, from which he graduated as a mechanical engineer.

== Chess career ==
He earned the title of Master in 1931 for his performance in the 7th USSR Championship. He thrice won the Leningrad City Chess Championship, in 1933/34 (joint), 1939, and 1947 (joint). He was a frequent participant in the USSR Chess Championship. His best result was in 1933 when he shared 3rd, behind the winner Mikhail Botvinnik. He also played in international tournaments, finishing 15th in Moscow 1935 (Botvinnik and Salo Flohr won). He took 2nd at Helsinki 1946 behind winner Viacheslav Ragozin.

Lisitsin was considered an expert on the Réti Opening above all others and won many of his best games with it. He was an author of several chess books, only a few sections of which have been translated from Russian into English. He wrote primarily about strategy, tactics, and endgame theory.

He was awarded the International Master title in 1950.

== Books in English ==
- Lisitsyn, G. M.; Cafferty, B. (1976). First Book of Chess Strategy. London: B.T. Batsford. ISBN 978-0900928697.
- Lisitsyn, G. M.; Cafferty, B. (1976). Second Book of Chess Strategy. London: B.T. Batsford. ISBN 978-0713414257.
- Lisitsyn, G. M.; Cafferty, B. (1980). The Strategy of Chess. London: B.T. Batsford. ISBN 978-0713433302. Note: merges the First Book of Chess Strategy and Second Book of Chess Strategy into a single volume.
- Romanovsky, Peter; Botvinnik, Mikhail; Kan, Ilya; Kmoch, Hans; Euwe, Max; Levenfish, Grigory; Lisitsin, Grigory (2021). The Leningrad Master Tournament 1934: With participation of Max Euwe and Hans Kmoch (Botvinnik's Method Of Preparing For Competition). Independently published. ISBN 979-8714484865.

== Legacy ==
An opening variation, the Lisitsin Gambit (1.Nf3 f5 2.e4), is named after him. His improvement to a line in the Bishop's Opening (1.e4 e5 2.Bc4 c6 3.d4 d5 4.exd5 cxd5 5.Bb5+ Bd7 6.Bxd7+ Nxd7 7.dxe5 Nxe5 8.Ne2) is called the Lisitsin Variation.
