= János Balogh (chess player) =

Hungarian-Romanian chess player

János Balogh (10 September 1892, Kézdivásárhely, now Târgu Secuiesc – 12 September 1980, Budapest) was a Hungarian–Romanian chess master. He was a Romanian Champion in 1930.

Balogh played for Romania in Chess Olympiads:

- In 2nd unofficial Olympiad at Budapest 1926;
- In the 2nd Chess Olympiad at The Hague 1928 (+4 –7 =5);
- In the 3rd Chess Olympiad at The Hague 1930 (+5 –5 =5);
- In the 4th Chess Olympiad at Prague 1931 (+3 –7 =5);

and for Hungary at first reserve board in 3rd unofficial Olympiad at Munich 1936 (+5 –1 =7). He won team bronze medal at Budapest 1926, team gold and individual bronze medals at Munich 1936.

After World War II, he participated in Hungarian championships in 1946, 1947, and 1950.

He was awarded the International Master of Correspondence title in 1953.

In 1960-1962 he became the Hungarian correspondence chess champion. As a chess player he was a member of the Hungarian national team from 1936 to 1938, and later as a correspondence chess player from 1940 to 1962.

== See also ==
- Balogh Defense
