= Julian Hodgson =

English chess grandmaster (born 1963)

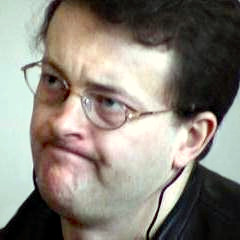
- Chess Bundesliga 2001 at Solingen

Personal information
- Born: Julian Michael Hodgson; 25 July 1963 (age 63) London, England

Chess career
- Country: England
- Title: Grandmaster (1988)
- FIDE rating: 2609 (October 2026)
- Peak rating: 2640 (July 2000)
- Peak ranking: No. 27 (July 1993)

Julian Michael "Jules" Hodgson (born 25 July 1963 in London) is a British chess player, grandmaster, and former British chess champion.

== Biography ==
He first came to the notice of the chess world for his achievements as a junior, whilst at Hammersmith Chess Club in West London; he was London under-18 champion at 12 years of age and won the British Boys under-21 title aged 14.

International Master and Grandmaster titles followed in 1983 and 1988 respectively. Tournament results, either shared or outright, included second place Lloyds Bank Open 1986: first place Benidorm 1986: first place Geneva Open 1988: second place Tel Aviv 1988: first place Kecskemét 1988 and first place Dos Hermanas 1989. At San Bernardino 1989, he finished first on tie-break, ahead of strong grandmasters Kiril Georgiev and Ivan Sokolov. A frequent visitor to Spain's Seville Open, he shared first place in 1986 and 1988. At the Philadelphia World Open of 1990, he was runner-up behind Igor Glek. In domestic competition, Hodgson competed regularly at the British Chess Championship, winning the title on four occasions (1991, 1992, 1999, and 2000).

In international team chess, he played for the English Olympiad team, winning the bronze team medal at Novi Sad 1990, and an individual silver medal at Manila 1992. The Manila result followed a notable win earlier in the year, at the open tournament held annually in Cappelle-la-Grande.

In 1997 he won the Canadian Open Chess Championship, and was joint winner of the National Open in Las Vegas. At Oxford in 1998, he shared victory with Jonny Hector, ahead of John Nunn and Emil Sutovsky. He was the winner of the North American Open in 1999. He recorded his peak Elo rating of 2640 in the year 2000. A return visit to the World Open saw him finish a half-point behind the leaders. In 2001, he was a joint winner of the Chicago Open with Alexander Goldin. For several years, Hodgson played league chess in both the German Bundesliga and British 4NCL.

Since 2003, he has not played competitive chess, instead teaching chess in schools.

== Playing style ==
Position: a8 black rook, b8 black knight, c8 black bishop, d8 black queen, e8 black king, f8 black bishop, h8 black rook, a7 black pawn, b7 black pawn, c7 black pawn, d7 black pawn, e7 black pawn, f7 black pawn, g7 black pawn, h7 black pawn, f6 black knight, g5 white bishop, d4 white pawn, a2 white pawn, b2 white pawn, c2 white pawn, e2 white pawn, f2 white pawn, g2 white pawn, h2 white pawn, a1 white rook, b1 white knight, d1 white queen, e1 white king, f1 white bishop, g1 white knight, h1 white rook

The Trompowsky Attack, frequently employed by Hodgson

Hodgson is known for having revived the Trompowsky Attack (1.d4 Nf6 2.Bg5), an opening which had been neglected for several years prior to his adoption and development of it. In interviews, he indicated that this was borne from laziness and a reluctance to learn established chess opening theory. During the 1980s, the Trompowsky became popular first in the UK, and later internationally. Fellow grandmaster Joe Gallagher wrote that it should be renamed the Hodgson–Trompowsky Attack, a view shared by others.. A related, but more obscure version of the system (1.d4 d5 2.Bg5) has been dubbed by some the Hodgson Attack and by others the Pseudo-Trompowsky or Queen's Bishop Attack.

== Bibliography ==
Hodgson is known for his Attack with Julian Hodgson book series, and contributed to the Trends series of opening booklets and also the Foxy Openings (VHS, later converted to DVD) series, including Trompowski-Main Line and Trompowski Success. Selected major works follow.

- Grand Prix Attack: f4 Against the Sicilian, Collier Books, 1985, ISBN 0-02-011430-3
- Chess Traveller's Quiz Book. Cadogan Chess, London 1993, ISBN 1-85744-030-7
- Quick Chess Knockouts. Everyman Chess, 1996, ISBN 1-85744-045-5
- Attack with GM Julian Hodgson, Vol. 1. Hodgson Enterprises, London 1996, ISBN 0-9529373-0-1
- Attack with GM Julian Hodgson, Vol. 2. Hodgson Enterprises, London 1997, ISBN 0-9529373-1-X
- Secrets of the Trompovsky. Hodgson Enterprises, London 1997, ISBN 0-9529373-2-8
