= Hermann Clemenz =

Estonian chess player (1846–1908)

Hermann Clemenz (23 January 1846 – 28 March 1908) was an Estonian chess master.

== Biography ==
Born in Dorpat, Russian Empire (present-day Tartu, Estonia), Clemenz began his chess career in his native town, then lived in St. Petersburg, where he participated in several tournaments. In Dorpat, he won some games against Eisenschmidt in the 1860s. In St. Petersburg, he took 4th in 1876 (Andreas Ascharin won), took 4th in 1877 (Mikhail Chigorin won), and took 3rd, behind Sergey Lebedev and Grigory Helbach, in 1901. He died on 28 March 1908, aged 62.

== Legacy ==
His name is attached to the Clemenz Opening; 1.h3. He played this opening in St. Petersburg in 1873.
