= Trompowsky Attack =

Chess opening

Position: a8 black rook, b8 black knight, c8 black bishop, d8 black queen, e8 black king, f8 black bishop, h8 black rook, a7 black pawn, b7 black pawn, c7 black pawn, d7 black pawn, e7 black pawn, f7 black pawn, g7 black pawn, h7 black pawn, f6 black knight, g5 white bishop, d4 white pawn, a2 white pawn, b2 white pawn, c2 white pawn, e2 white pawn, f2 white pawn, g2 white pawn, h2 white pawn, a1 white rook, b1 white knight, d1 white queen, e1 white king, f1 white bishop, g1 white knight, h1 white rook
- Moves: 1.d4 Nf6 2.Bg5
- ECO: A45
- Named after: Octávio Trompowsky
- Parent: Queen's Pawn game
- Synonym(s): Trompowsky Opening; Opočenský Opening; Ruth Opening; Zot

The Trompowsky Attack (Note: Also known as the Trompowsky Opening, Opočenský Opening, Ruth Opening, and the Zot.) is a chess opening that begins with the moves:

1. d4 Nf6
2. Bg5

White prepares to exchange the bishop for Black's knight, inflicting doubled pawns upon Black in the process. This is not a lethal threat; Black can choose to fall in with White's plan.

The Trompowsky is a popular alternative to the more common lines after 1.d4 Nf6 beginning 2.c4 or 2.Nf3. By playing 2.Bg5, White sidesteps immense bodies of opening theory of various Indian Defences like the Queen's Indian, King's Indian, Nimzo-Indian, as well as the Grünfeld Defence.

== History ==
The opening is named after the one-time Brazilian champion Octávio Trompowsky (1897–1984) who played it in the 1930s and 1940s. Chess master Karel Opočenský (1892–1975) also played it in the 1930s, and the opening is also known as the Opočenský Opening. Also, chess master William Allen Ruth developed the opening simultaneously in the 1930s, and it was well known by locals in Pennsylvania as the Ruth Opening. The Trompowsky has also been called the Zot.

Julian Hodgson, Antoaneta Stefanova, and Arjun Erigaisi are among several grandmasters who often employ the Trompowsky. World Champion Magnus Carlsen has occasionally employed the Trompowsky, notably in the first game of the 2016 World Chess Championship against Sergey Karjakin.

== Main lines ==
Black has a number of ways to meet the Trompowsky, some of which avoid doubled pawns, while others allow them. The most common Black responses are discussed here.

- 2...Ne4 is the most common reply. Black violates an opening principle ("Don't move the same piece twice in the opening"), but attacks White's bishop, forcing it to either move again or be defended.
  - 3.h4 (Raptor Variation) defends the bishop, and Black should avoid 3...Nxg5? since that will open up a file for the white rook. Instead, Black can start making a grab for the centre and kick the white bishop away with a timely ...h6 advance.
  - Usually, White retreats with 3.Bf4 or 3.Bh4. In this case, Black will try to maintain the knight on e4, or at least gain a concession before retreating it. (For instance, if White chases the knight away with f3, the pawn takes away the best development square from White's own knight.) In the case of 3. Bh4, 3... g5 is occasionally seen, after which the most common reply is 4. f3 gxh4 5. fxe4 c5, leading to a sharp and imbalanced game.
  - 3.Nf3? is rarely seen except among amateurs; after 3...Nxg5 4.Nxg5 e5! Black regains the lost time by the discovered attack on the knight; White's centre is liquidated and White has no compensation for the bishop pair.
- 2...d5 makes a grab for the centre, allowing White to inflict doubled pawns. If White does so, Black will try to show that the pair of bishops is valuable, and that White has wasted time by moving a bishop twice in order to trade it off. Black usually recaptures away from the centre with 3...exf6, preserving a defensible pawn structure and opening diagonals for the queen and dark-squared bishop; however, 3...gxf6 (played by Sergey Karjakin against Magnus Carlsen in the opening game of the 2016 World Chess Championship) is also common. Alternatively, White can transpose into the Richter–Veresov Attack with 3.Nc3 or the Tartakower Variation of the Torre Attack with 3.Nf3.
- 2...e6 also avoids doubled pawns since the queen can recapture if White plays Bxf6. The move 2...e6 also opens a diagonal for the black king's bishop to develop. On the other hand, the knight is now pinned, and this can be annoying.
- 2...c5 also makes a grab for the centre, planning to trade off the c-pawn for White's d-pawn. Again, White can inflict doubled pawns, and again Black will try to make use of the bishop pair.
- 2...g6 enables Black to fianchetto the dark-squared bishop. If White immediately captures the knight (3.Bxf6), Black must recapture away from the centre with 3...exf6.
- 2...c6 is an offbeat line in which Black threatens a later ...Qb6, forcing White to defend or sacrifice the b-pawn. White can play the thematic 3.Bxf6 or 3.Nf3, but must avoid 3.e3?? Qa5+, when White resigned (in light of 4...Qxg5) in Djordjević–(Milorad) Kovačević, Bela Crkva 1984—"the shortest ever loss by a master" (Graham Burgess, The Quickest Chess Victories of All Time, p. 33).

== 1.d4 d5 2.Bg5 ==
White can also play 2.Bg5 after 1.d4 d5. This is known as the Pseudo-Trompowsky, Hodgson Attack, Levitsky Attack, Queen's Bishop Attack, and Bishop Attack, and is covered in ECO code D00. Play transposes to the Trompowsky if Black plays 2...Nf6.

== See also ==
- Torre Attack
- Hodgson Attack
- List of chess openings
- List of chess openings named after people
