= Van 't Kruijs Opening =

Chess opening

Position: a8 black rook, b8 black knight, c8 black bishop, d8 black queen, e8 black king, f8 black bishop, g8 black knight, h8 black rook, a7 black pawn, b7 black pawn, c7 black pawn, d7 black pawn, e7 black pawn, f7 black pawn, g7 black pawn, h7 black pawn, e3 white pawn, a2 white pawn, b2 white pawn, c2 white pawn, d2 white pawn, f2 white pawn, g2 white pawn, h2 white pawn, a1 white rook, b1 white knight, c1 white bishop, d1 white queen, e1 white king, f1 white bishop, g1 white knight, h1 white rook
- Moves: 1.e3
- ECO: A00
- Named after: Maarten van 't Kruijs
- Synonym: Van 't Kruys Opening

The Van 't Kruijs (Note: Also spelled Van 't Kruys.) Opening (Dutch pronunciation: [vɑn ət ˈkrœys]) is a chess opening defined by the move:

1. e3

It is named after the Dutch player Maarten van 't Kruijs (1813–1885) who won the sixth Dutch championship in 1878. As this opening move is rarely played, it is considered an irregular opening and is classified under the A00 code in the Encyclopaedia of Chess Openings.

== Discussion ==
Although there are several examples from games in the 19th century, the Van 't Kruijs Opening is not popular in the modern era and is not a common choice for grandmasters, but its ability to transpose into many different openings explains its attraction for some players such as Pavel Blatny, Aron Nimzowitsch, and Bent Larsen. Benjamin & Schiller (1987) call it a "chameleon". According to ChessBase, it ranks sixth in popularity out of the twenty possible first moves.

The loss of popularity is due to 1.e3 gaining little except as a transposition strategy to reach other positions. It releases the king's bishop, and makes a modest claim in the center (supporting a future d4), but the move is somewhat passive compared to the much more common King's Pawn Game (1.e4). The queen's bishop's development is somewhat obstructed by the pawn on e3, and White usually wants to take more than a modest stake of the center.

Although not very aggressive for a first move, play may transpose to lines of the English Opening (c2–c4), Queen's Pawn Game (d2–d4), or French Defense (delayed d2–d4), Bird's Opening (f2–f4) positions, the modern variation of Larsen's Opening (b2–b3), or the Stonewall Attack.

=== Black's response ===
Benjamin & Schiller's (1987) general advice is to watch out for transpositions and suggest a 1...g6 fianchetto response since e3 positions against fianchetto are weak. The most common response after 1.e3 is 1...Nf6, where White generally continues with 2.Nf3, effectively transposing to the Reti Opening. Here, White can either play d4 soon after, potentially transposing to a Queen's Gambit Declined line, but can also deviate with a system similar to the Hedgehog System played by Black, with b3, c4, Nbd2, and Be2.

If Black responds with 1...d5 or 1...c5, White can respond similarly to 1...Nf6. Even 1...b6!?, 1...g6!?, 1...c6!?, or 1...e6 is completely playable.

Another common response is 1...e5, where White typically either plays 2.c4 transposing to a reversed Sicilian Defense (such as the Taimanov Variation or Kan Variation, or other Sicilians that feature the move e6 by Black) or 2.d4, transposing to the French Defense Exchange Variation after 2...exd4 3.exd4 d5.

Other moves like 1...b5?, 1...g5?!, 1...h5?!, or 1...a5?! are rarely played.

This opening can also be used for White to effectively play as Black. For example, after 1.e3 e5, White can play 2.e4!?, making it a reversed Open Game. This is not recommended, however, since this gives the first-move advantage to Black straight away. Similarly, 1.e3 f5 2.e4 goes to a reversed From's Gambit.

== Variations ==
- 1.e3 Nf6 2.c4 d6 3.Nf3 e5 4.d4 Nbd7 (Sokolsky–Panoff, 1936)
- 1.e3 e5 2.b3 c5 3.Bb2 Nc6 4.Nf3 e4 5.Ne5 d6 6.Nxc6 bxc6 7.d3 Nf6 8.dxe4 Nxe4 9.Bd3 Qa5+
- 1.e3 e5 2.c4 d6 3.Nc3 Nc6 4.b3 Nf6 (Amsterdam Attack)
- 1.e3 e5 2.Nc3 d5 3.f4 exf4 4.Nf3
- 1.e3 e5 2.Nc3 d5 3.d4 exd4 4.Qxd4 Nf6 5.e4 Nc6 6.Bb5 Bd7 7.Bxc6 Bxc6 8.e5 Ne4 9.Nxe4 dxe4 10.Ne2 Be7 11.Be3 Qxd4 12.Nxd4 Bd7 (Nimzowitsch–Tarrasch, 1928)
- 1.e3 e5 2.Nc3 d5 3.d4 exd4 4.Qxd4 Nf6 5.e4 dxe4 6.Qxd8+ Kxd8 7.Bg5 Bf5 8.0-0-0+ Nd7 9.Nce2
- 1.e3 e5 2.Nc3 Nc6 3.f4 exf4 4.Nf3
- 1.e3 e5 2.Nc3 Nf6 3.Be2 d5 4.d4 exd4 (Horing–Paulsen, 1863)
- 1.e3 e5 2.Bc4 d5 3.Bb3
- 1.e3 d5 2.Nc3 Nf6 3.a3 e5 4.f4 exf4 5.Nf3
- 1.e3 f5 2.g3 Nf6 3.Bg2 e5 4.Ne2 d5 (Wisker–Bird, 1873)
- 1.e3 b6 2.b3 Bb7 3.Bb2 d6 4.d4 Nf6 (Mason–Winawer, 1881)
- 1.e3 d5 2.d3 (The Cow)
- 1.e3 d5 2.d3 e5 3.Ne2 Bd6 4.Ng3 Nf6 5.Nd2 0-0 6.Nb3 (The Cow: Bull Variation)

== See also ==
- List of chess openings
- List of chess openings named after people
