= Benjamin Blumenfeld =

Russian chess player

- Бениамин Мордхелевич Блюменфельд
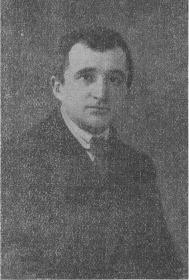
- Born: May 24, 1884; Vilkaviškis, Russian Empire
- Died: March 5, 1947 (aged 62); Moscow, USSR
- Citizenship: USSR
- Occupation: chess player
- Known for: Blumenfeld Gambit

Benjamin Blumenfeld (24 May 1884, Vilkaviškis – 5 March 1947, Moscow) was a Russian chess master.

He was born in Vilkaviškis, in the Suwałki Governorate of the Russian Empire (present-day Lithuania). In 1905/06 he tied for second/third with Akiba Rubinstein, behind Gersz Salwe, in St. Petersburg (the fourth Russian championship). In 1907 he tied for second/third with Georg Marco, behind Mikhail Chigorin, in Moscow.

In 1920 he took eighth in Moscow (Russian Chess Olympiad, 1st URS-ch). The event was won by Alexander Alekhine. In 1925 he tied for second/third with Boris Verlinsky, behind Aleksandr Sergeyev, in the Moscow championship.

He invented the Blumenfeld Gambit (1.d4 Nf6 2.c4 c5 3.d5 e6 4.Nf3 b5).

In 1945 Blumenfeld defended PhD thesis on psychology, based on cognition in chess. At the time, it was one of the first attempts to do research into chess psychology.

== Notable games ==
- Benjamin Markovich Blumenfeld vs Aron Nimzowitsch, Berlin 1903, Scotch Game: Schmidt Variation (C45), 1-0
