= Danvers Opening =

Position: a8 black rook, b8 black knight, c8 black bishop, d8 black queen, e8 black king, f8 black bishop, g8 black knight, h8 black rook, a7 black pawn, b7 black pawn, c7 black pawn, d7 black pawn, f7 black pawn, g7 black pawn, h7 black pawn, e5 black pawn, h5 white queen, e4 white pawn, a2 white pawn, b2 white pawn, c2 white pawn, d2 white pawn, f2 white pawn, g2 white pawn, h2 white pawn, a1 white rook, b1 white knight, c1 white bishop, e1 white king, f1 white bishop, g1 white knight, h1 white rook
- Moves: 1.e4 e5 2.Qh5
- ECO: C20
- Named after: Danvers State Hospital
- Parent: Open Game
- Synonyms: Kentucky Opening; Queen's Attack; Queen's Excursion; Wayward Queen Attack; Patzer Opening; Parham Attack

The Danvers Opening is an unorthodox chess opening characterized by the moves:

1. e4 e5
2. Qh5

It is also known as the Kentucky Opening, Queen's Attack, Queen's Excursion, Wayward Queen Attack, Patzer Opening, and Parham Attack.

The Encyclopaedia of Chess Openings code C20 includes the Danvers Opening and other miscellaneous second moves for White after 1.e4 e5.

== History and nomenclature ==
1.e4 e5 2.Qh5 has acquired several names over the years, none of which are universally used. The earliest known appearance in print was in the Dubuque Chess Journal in May 1875, where it was dubbed the Kentucky Opening, perhaps in reference to a game played in Danville, Kentucky, which was published in the August issue of the same magazine. (This name was also applied by J. H. Blackburne to the unsound Jerome Gambit.) In the American Chess Bulletin in 1905, the opening was referred to as the Danvers Opening, so named by E. E. Southard, a well-known psychiatrist and a strong amateur chess player, after the hospital where he worked.

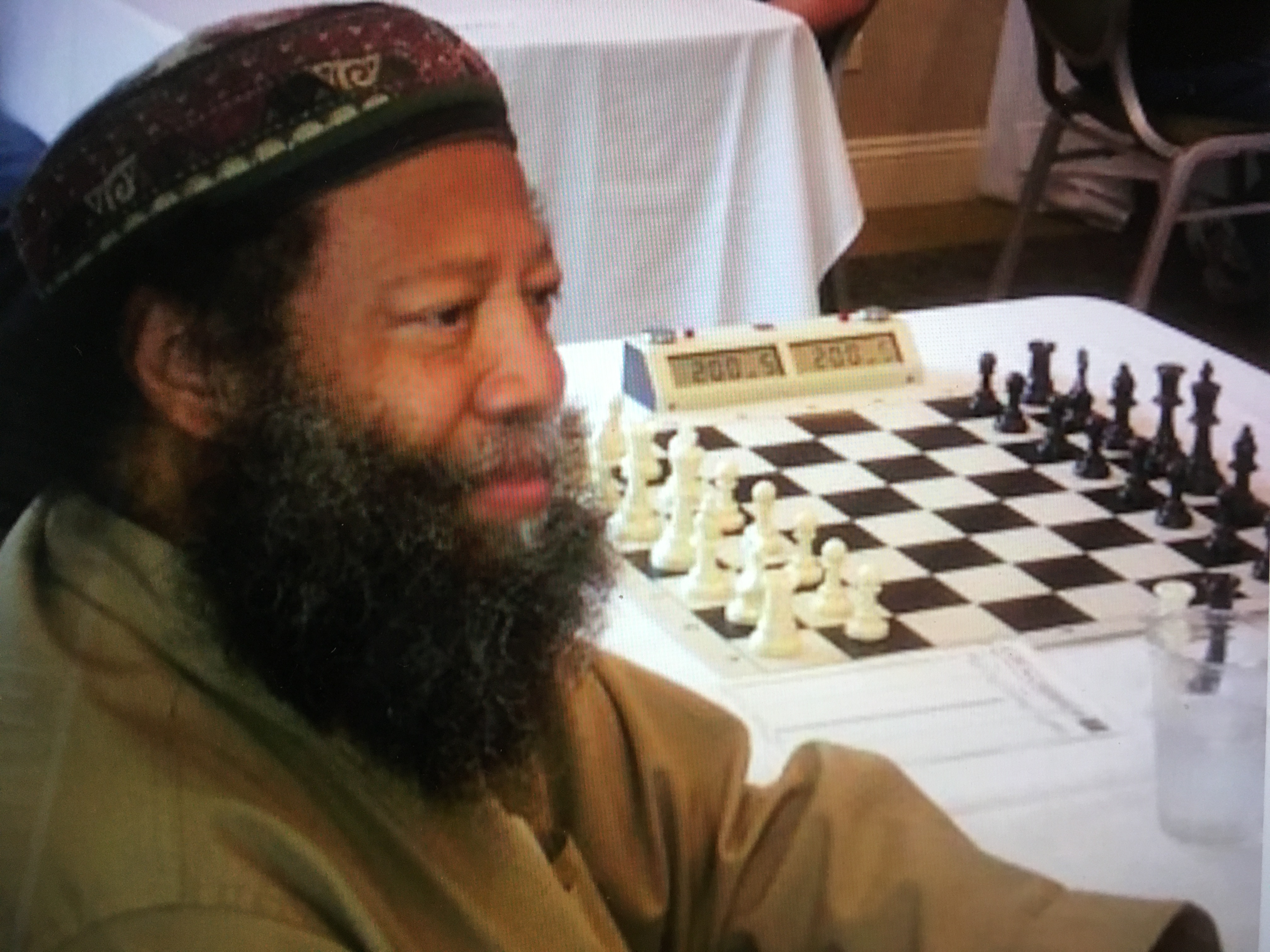
Bernard Parham, in USCF tournament in 2010

Bernard Parham of Indianapolis was one of the few master-level players to advocate this line. Parham was known for his eccentric theories on the game of chess, which he had developed into what he had called the "Matrix System". Parham's Matrix System advocated early development of the queen in several positions, as in his favored line as White against the Sicilian Defense, 1.e4 c5 2.Qh5?! Parham argued that just as Richard Réti and Aron Nimzowitsch pioneered the hypermodern style of chess, his own ideas which are considered strange today may well be considered viable in the future. Several internet-based sources refer to 1.e4 e5 2.Qh5 as the Parham Attack or Parham Opening.

The most notable use of 1.e4 e5 2.Qh5 by a grandmaster (GM) occurred in 2005, when U.S. Champion Hikaru Nakamura played it in two tournament games. The better known of these was against Indian GM Krishnan Sasikiran at the May 2005 Sigeman Tournament in Copenhagen/Malmö, Denmark. Nakamura got a reasonable position out of the opening but lost the game due to a mistake made in the middlegame. He later wrote on the Internet, "I do believe that 2.Qh5 is a playable move, in fact I had a very good position in the game, and was close to winning if I had in fact played 23.e5." The previous month, Nakamura had played 2.Qh5 against GM Nikola Mitkov at the April 2005 HB Global Chess Challenge in Minneapolis. The game ended in a draw after 55 moves.

More often the opening is adopted by chess novices, as when actor Woody Harrelson played it against Garry Kasparov in a 1999 exhibition game in Prague. Harrelson achieved a draw after being assisted by several grandmasters who were in Prague attending the match between Alexei Shirov and Judit Polgár. The next year Kasparov again faced the opening as Black when tennis star Boris Becker played it against him in an exhibition game in New York. This time Kasparov won in 17 moves.

== Assessment ==
The Danvers Opening violates a conventional opening principle by developing the queen too early, subjecting it to attack and loss of tempo. Nonetheless, the opening causes Black some problems. Left to their own devices, Black can develop naturally with moves like ...Nf6, ...Bc5, and ...Nc6. The Danvers Opening hinders this by forcing Black (unless they want to sacrifice a pawn) to first defend the e-pawn (usually with 2...Nc6), then 3.Bc4 forces Black to make some compromise to defend against the mate threat; 3...g6 commits Black to fianchettoing the king's bishop, 3...Qe7 blocks the bishop, and 3...Qf6 occupies the knight's best square. In 2005, the Dutch GM Hans Ree called 2.Qh5 "a provocative but quite sensible move", and suspected it would have been effective because of its shock value.

As with the Napoleon Opening (2.Qf3?!), 2.Qh5 is frequently played with the hope of delivering the Scholar's Mate, e.g. 2.Qh5 Nc6 3.Bc4 Nf6?? 4.Qxf7#. Black can easily avoid this, however, and unlike 2.Qh5, 2.Qf3 poses no impediments to Black's development.

== Possible continuations ==
Black's worst possible response to 2.Qh5 is 2...Ke7?? 3.Qxe5#. (This line ties with a few others for the fastest possible checkmate by White.) Also losing is 2...g6?? 3.Qxe5+, winning a rook and pawn. The most frequently played move is 2...Nc6; 2...Nf6!?, 2...d6 and 2...Qe7 are also occasionally seen.

=== Main line: 2...Nc6 ===
Position: a8 black rook, c8 black bishop, d8 black queen, e8 black king, f8 black bishop, h8 black rook, a7 black pawn, b7 black pawn, c7 black pawn, d7 black pawn, f7 black pawn, h7 black pawn, c6 black knight, f6 black knight, g6 black pawn, e5 black pawn, c4 white bishop, e4 white pawn, f3 white queen, a2 white pawn, b2 white pawn, c2 white pawn, d2 white pawn, e2 white knight, f2 white pawn, g2 white pawn, h2 white pawn, a1 white rook, b1 white knight, c1 white bishop, e1 white king, h1 white rook

Main position after 1.e4 e5 2.Qh5 Nc6 3.Bc4 g6 4.Qf3 Nf6 5.Ne2

Black defends the e-pawn and prepares to meet 3.Bc4 with 3...Qe7 or 3...g6. The latter move is more common and after 4.Qf3 Nf6 5.Ne2 the main position is reached (diagram). White is not worse, but also has no advantage. Black can adopt different plans, one of the most popular being 5...Bg7, where 6.0-0 is White's best try for dynamic play, as 6.d3 d5 will lead to an even position with few attacking chances, and 6.Nbc3 Nb4 is interesting but promises little for White.

GMs Krishnan Sasikiran and Nikola Mitkov played this move against Hikaru Nakamura in 2005.

=== 2...Nf6 ===
This is a speculative gambit sometimes called the Kiddie Countergambit. It is unnecessary to sacrifice a pawn for development, since the white queen must lose a tempo eventually; however, FIDE Master Dennis Monokroussos advocates the move as the "psychologically correct" response.

=== 2...d6 ===
Black defends the center pawn and simultaneously opens a diagonal for the queen's bishop, but blocks the king's bishop.

=== 2...Qe7 ===
Black defends the center pawn and simultaneously guards the f7-pawn, but blocks the king's bishop.

Position: a8 black rook, c8 black bishop, e8 black king, f8 black bishop, h8 black rook, a7 black pawn, b7 black pawn, c7 black pawn, d7 black pawn, e7 black queen, f7 black pawn, g7 black pawn, h7 black pawn, c6 black knight, f6 black knight, e5 black pawn, e4 white pawn, c3 white knight, a2 white pawn, b2 white pawn, c2 white pawn, d2 white pawn, f2 white pawn, g2 white pawn, h2 white pawn, a1 white rook, c1 white bishop, d1 white queen, e1 white king, f1 white bishop, g1 white knight, h1 white rook

Position after 1.e4 e5 2.Qh5 Qe7 3.Nc3 Nf6 4.Qd1 Nc6

== See also ==
- List of chess openings
