= Jerome Gambit =

Position: a8 black rook, c8 black bishop, d8 black queen, g8 black knight, h8 black rook, a7 black pawn, b7 black pawn, c7 black pawn, d7 black pawn, f7 black king, g7 black pawn, h7 black pawn, c5 black bishop, e5 black knight, e4 white pawn, a2 white pawn, b2 white pawn, c2 white pawn, d2 white pawn, f2 white pawn, g2 white pawn, h2 white pawn, a1 white rook, b1 white knight, c1 white bishop, d1 white queen, e1 white king, h1 white rook
- Moves: 1.e4 e5 2.Nf3 Nc6 3.Bc4 Bc5 4.Bxf7+ Kxf7 5.Nxe5+ Nxe5
- ECO: C50
- Named after: Alonzo Wheeler Jerome
- Parent: Giuoco Piano

The Jerome Gambit is an unsound chess opening which is an offshoot of the Giuoco Piano. It is characterized by the moves:

1. e4 e5
2. Nf3 Nc6
3. Bc4 Bc5
4. Bxf7+?! Kxf7
5. Nxe5+ Nxe5

White sacrifices two pieces (and eventually regains one) for two pawns in hopes of exposing Black's king and obtaining a mating attack. The line was a brief fad in the late 19th century, but it is almost never seen today.

== Discussion ==
The opening is named after Alonzo Wheeler Jerome (1834–1902) of Paxton, Illinois, who had a game with this opening against the problemist William Shinkman published in the Dubuque Chess Journal in 1876. Blackburne wrote of it, "I used to call this the Kentucky opening. For a while after its introduction, it was greatly favoured by certain players, but they soon grew tired of it." Blackburne's name for the opening may have arisen from confusion with 1.e4 e5 2.Qh5, which was also published in the Dubuque Chess Journal and dubbed the "Kentucky Opening" there.

In the third edition of the opening treatise Chess Openings, Ancient and Modern (1896), the authors wrote:

The Jerome Gambit is an American invention, and a very risky attack. It is described in the American Supplement to Cook's Synopsis as unsound but not to be trifled with. The first player sacrifices two pieces for two pawns, with the chances arising from the adversary's king being displaced, and drawn into the centre of the board.

Similarly, du Mont wrote that it "is unsound, but has the saving grace of leading to a lively game and is therefore suitable for an occasional friendly game. The defender cannot afford to be careless."

White may regain one of the two sacrificed pieces with 6.d4, but Black retains a decisive material advantage with 6...Bxd4 7.Qxd4 Qf6. More commonly, White plays 6.Qh5+. In that event, Freeborough and Ranken analyzed two lines. One is 6...Kf8 7.Qxe5 Qe7 8.Qf5+ Ke8 9.Nc3 d6 10.Qf3 Qf7 11.Qe2 Nh6 12.0-0 c6, with large advantage to Black. Freeborough and Ranken also analyze the bold 6.Qh5+ Ke6!? ("follow[ing] out Mr. Steinitz's theory that the King is a strong piece") 7.Qf5+ Kd6 8.d4 (or 8.f4 Qf6 9.fxe5+ Qxe5) Bxd4 9.Na3 c6 10.c3 Qf6 11.cxd4 Qxf5 12.exf5 Nf7 13.Bf4+ Ke7, again with a large advantage. Lines to avoid for Black after 6.Qh5+ are 6...Kf6?? 7.Qf5+ Ke7 8.Qxe5+ Kf7 9.Qxc5 and 6...Ke7?? 7.Qxe5+ followed by Qxc5, both regaining both pieces and winning two pawns.
