= Octávio Trompowsky =

Brazilian chess player (1897–1984)

- Born: Octávio Figueira Trompowsky de Almeida; 30 November 1897; Rio de Janeiro, Brazil
- Died: 26 March 1984 (aged 86); Rio de Janeiro, Brazil
- Occupation: Chess player
- Known for: Trompowsky Attack

Octávio Figueira Trompowsky de Almeida (30 November 1897 – 26 March 1984) was a Brazilian chess player, who was born and died in Rio de Janeiro. Trompowsky won the 1939 Brazilian Championship, but is best known as the player for whom the Trompowsky Attack (1.d4 Nf6 2.Bg5) chess opening was named. The Trompowsky Attack remains a popular opening choice.
