= Minority attack =

In chess, a strategic pawn minority advancement

Position: a7 black pawn, b7 black pawn, f7 black pawn, g7 black pawn, h7 black pawn, c6 black pawn, d5 black pawn, d4 white pawn, e3 white pawn, a2 white pawn, b2 white pawn, f2 white pawn, g2 white pawn, h2 white pawn

In the Carlsbad pawn structure, a common plan for White is to advance the a- and b-pawns in a minority attack.

In chess, a minority attack is the advancement of one's pawns on the side of the board where one has fewer pawns than their opponent, intending to use their minority to strategically provoke a weakness (i.e, an isolated or backward pawn) in the opponent's pawn structure. The minority attack is a common middlegame plan that can be played in many pawn structures. The name might be misleading, as the "attack" does not involve tactics planned to produce checkmate or significant material gain, but rather a strategical and structural advantage for the attacking player.

== Aspects ==
The minority attack can be strengthened by the moving of one or both rooks to the files where the attacking player intends to advance their pawns, planning prophylactically for the opening of the files. Common openings that result in pawn structures where a minority attack is effective include the Queen's Gambit Declined and the Caro–Kann Defense. The minority attack occurs most commonly on the queenside, as players commonly castle kingside in openings where a minority attack is effective, and the advancement of the pawns on the side of the castled king is widely considered to severely weaken the king's safety.

== Examples ==
=== Karpov vs. Lautier, Dortmund 1995 ===
Karpov vs. Lautier, 1995

Position: d8 black rook, e8 black rook, f8 black knight, g8 black king, a7 black pawn, b7 black pawn, f7 black pawn, g7 black pawn, b6 black bishop, c6 black pawn, e6 black bishop, f6 black knight, h6 black pawn, e5 black queen, b4 white pawn, a3 white pawn, d3 white bishop, e3 white pawn, g3 white knight, h3 white pawn, c2 white queen, d2 white bishop, e2 white knight, f2 white pawn, g2 white pawn, a1 white rook, d1 white rook, g1 white king

This game, lauded as an example of a successful minority attack, demonstrates the goals and execution of the attack. In the diagrammed position, Anatoly Karpov has just played 20.b4! initiating the minority attack against grandmaster Joël Lautier.

After

20... Ng6 21. a4 a6 22. Bc3 Qg5 23. Bd4 Bxd4 24. Nxd4 Bd5 25. e4 Be6 26. Nf3 Qf4

Karpov played

27. b5!

provoking a weakness and threatening to severely damage Black's pawn structure by capturing on a6 or c6, creating an isolated pawn and leaving Lautier three pawn islands.

27... axb5 28. axb5

The game lasted 44 moves before Lautier resigned due to Karpov's passed d-pawn and the weakness of Black's c-pawn.

=== Petrosian vs. Krogius, Tbilisi 1959 ===
Petrosian vs. Krogius, 1959

Position: a8 black rook, c8 black bishop, d8 black queen, f8 black rook, g8 black king, a7 black pawn, b7 black pawn, c7 black pawn, e7 black knight, f7 black pawn, g7 black bishop, h7 black pawn, g6 black pawn, d5 black pawn, b4 white pawn, d4 white pawn, c3 white knight, d3 white bishop, e3 white pawn, f3 white knight, a2 white pawn, f2 white pawn, g2 white pawn, h2 white pawn, a1 white rook, d1 white queen, f1 white rook, g1 white king

In this position, World Champion Tigran Petrosian has just played 12.b4 against grandmaster Nikolai Krogius, initiating the minority attack and intending to advance both the a- and b-pawns to provoke weaknesses in Black's queenside majority.

After

12... Bf5 13. Bxf5 Nxf5

Petrosian played

14. b5!

On move 22, the advancement of White's queenside pawns resulted in a destruction of Black's queenside pawn structure and the creation of two isolated pawns for Black, creating a decisive advantage for Petrosian.

=== Seirawan vs. Tal, Niksic 1983 ===
Seirawan vs. Tal, 1983

Position: a8 black rook, b8 black knight, c8 black rook, g8 black king, a7 black pawn, b7 black pawn, c7 black pawn, f7 black pawn, g7 black pawn, e6 black bishop, f6 black queen, h6 black pawn, d5 black pawn, b4 white pawn, d4 white pawn, a3 white pawn, c3 white queen, e3 white pawn, g3 white knight, f2 white pawn, g2 white pawn, h2 white pawn, a1 white rook, e1 white king, f1 white bishop, h1 white rook

In this position, Syrian-American grandmaster Yasser Seirawan has just played 13.b4 against the former world champion Mikhail Tal, expanding his a- and b-pawn minority on the queenside against Tal's a-, b-, and c-pawn majority.

Tal responded

13... a5!?

counterattacking Seirawan's queenside and hoping to isolate the b-pawn. The game continued

14. Be2 axb4 15. axb4 Rxa1+ 16. Qxa1 Qe7 17. Qc3 Nc6

when Seirawan continued

18. b5!

removing the knight from the powerful c6-square and advancing his b-pawn. The game further continued

18... Nd8 19. 0-0 c5 20. bxc6 bxc6 21. Rd1

and Black's weak c-pawn fell on move 33, creating a decisive structural advantage for Seirawan.
