= Open file =

Term in chess; a file with no pawns of either color on it

Position: e8 black cross, a7 black pawn, b7 black pawn, e7 black cross, f7 black pawn, g7 black pawn, h7 black pawn, e6 black cross, d5 black pawn, e5 black cross, e4 black cross, c3 white pawn, e3 black cross, h3 white pawn, a2 white pawn, b2 white pawn, e2 black cross, f2 white pawn, g2 white pawn, e1 white rook

The e-file is an open file since there are no pawns on it. The rook can move to any square on the file (marked with crosses), uninhibited by pawns.

An open file in chess is a file with no pawns of either color on it. In the diagram, the e-file is an open file. An open file can provide a line of attack for a rook or queen. Having rooks or queens on open files or half-open files is considered advantageous, as it allows a player to attack more easily, since a rook or queen can move down the file to penetrate the opponent's position.

== Strategic advantage ==
A common strategic objective for a rook or queen on an open file is to reach its seventh or eighth rank (the opponent's second or first rank). Controlling the seventh rank is generally worth at least a pawn, as it threatens all the opponent's yet-unmoved pawns to some degree. Controlling the eighth rank is likely to force the opposing king into a more exposed position and puts pressure on any remaining undeveloped pieces, or if the rank is already clear, allows unobstructed movement behind the enemy forces. Aron Nimzowitsch first recognized the power of a major piece on an open file, writing in his famous book My System that the main objective of a rook or queen on an open file is "the eventual occupation of the 7th or 8th rank".

Many games are decided based on this strategy. In the game Anand–Ivanchuk, Amber 2001, Anand sacrificed a pawn to open the d-file, where his rooks had previously formed a battery. White then used the open file to deploy his rooks to the seventh and eighth ranks and win the game, by exploiting the weakness of Black's a-pawn. White's dominance on the d-file allowed him to maneuver his rooks to aggressive posts deep within Black's defense.

Anand vs. Ivanchuk, 2001: Example of creating and exploiting an open file

Position: e8 black knight, e7 black king, f7 black pawn, a6 black pawn, d6 black pawn, e6 black rook, h6 black pawn, a5 white pawn, b5 black rook, c5 black pawn, e5 white pawn, g5 black pawn, b4 black pawn, c4 white knight, b3 white pawn, f3 white pawn, h3 white pawn, c2 white pawn, d2 white rook, f2 white king, g2 white pawn, d1 white rook

Position after 34.e5!

Position: d8 black cross, e8 black knight, d7 black cross, e7 black king, f7 black pawn, a6 black pawn, d6 black cross, e6 black rook, h6 black pawn, a5 white pawn, b5 black rook, c5 black pawn, d5 black cross, e5 black pawn, g5 black pawn, b4 black pawn, c4 white knight, d4 black cross, b3 white pawn, d3 black cross, f3 white pawn, h3 white pawn, c2 white pawn, d2 white rook, f2 white king, g2 white pawn, d1 white rook

After 34...dxe5, White obtained the open d-file (marked with crosses). Additionally, White's knight now has a very strong outpost.

Position: d8 white rook, e8 black knight, a7 white rook, a6 black pawn, e6 black rook, f6 black pawn, g6 black king, h6 black pawn, a5 white pawn, b5 black rook, c5 black pawn, e5 black pawn, g5 black pawn, b4 black pawn, c4 white knight, b3 white pawn, f3 white pawn, h3 white pawn, c2 white pawn, f2 white king, g2 white pawn

Position after 35.Rd7+ Kf6 36.Ra7 Kg6 37.Rdd7 f6 38.Rd8 – White's rooks have occupied the 7th and 8th ranks. Black resigned on move 43.

== See also ==
- Half-open file
