= Backward pawn =

Chess pawn that cannot be safely advanced

Position: c6 black pawn, d5 black pawn, d4 white pawn

Black has a backward pawn on c6.

In chess, a backward pawn is a pawn located on a half-open file that cannot be defended by another pawn and cannot be safely advanced. In the diagram, the black pawn on the c6-square is backward.

== Strategy ==
Backward pawns can be a positional disadvantage if not compensated for by active piece play. The opponent can place a piece—usually a knight, but it can also be a bishop or a rook—on the hole in front of the pawn without any risk of a pawn driving it away; such a square is called an outpost and can be very powerful, especially if there is no practical way to trade it off with another piece. The backward pawn also prevents its owner's rooks and queen on the same file from attacking the piece placed on the hole.

As the backward pawn is on a half-open file, the pawn can be attacked by an opponent's rook or queen. Doubling rooks or tripling against the pawn is a common strategy. Keeping queens on the board, trading off minor pieces and creating a second weakness can help target the pawn more effectively. Pieces can become weak when they are devoted to protecting a backward pawn, since their obligation to defend the pawn keeps them from being deployed for other uses. The player with a backward pawn should seek the initiative.

The successful capture of a backward pawn can be disastrous for its owner. When a backward pawn is lost, its neighbors may become isolated, making them vulnerable, and the king's safety could be put in jeopardy, due to the opponent's pieces now having a clear path to move closer to it.

Active piece play and central control can compensate for a backward pawn. The Najdorf Variation is centered around this concept, with Black accepting a backward d-pawn in exchange for two central pawns and dynamic piece play.

== In practice ==
Position: a8 black rook, c8 black bishop, d8 black queen, e8 black king, f8 black bishop, h8 black rook, a7 black pawn, b7 black pawn, f7 black pawn, g7 black pawn, h7 black pawn, c6 black knight, d6 black pawn, f6 black knight, b5 white knight, e5 black pawn, e4 white pawn, c3 white knight, a2 white pawn, b2 white pawn, c2 white pawn, f2 white pawn, g2 white pawn, h2 white pawn, a1 white rook, c1 white bishop, d1 white queen, e1 white king, f1 white bishop, h1 white rook

Sveshnikov Variation after Black's 6...d6

Modern opening theory features several openings in which one of the players deliberately incurs a backward pawn in exchange for some other advantage such as initiative or better development. An example is the Sveshnikov Variation of the Sicilian Defence.

After the moves 1. e4 c5 2. Nf3 Nc6 3. d4 cxd4 4. Nxd4 Nf6 (or 4...e5!? 5.Nb5 d6 – the Kalashnikov Variation) 5. Nc3 e5!? 6. Ndb5 d6 (see diagram), Black has a backward pawn on d6, but White now has to endure a displacement of his knights and an undermining of his center after 7. Bg5 a6 8. Na3 b5 9. Bxf6 gxf6! 10. Nd5 (dodging the threatened pawn-fork of the knights) 10... f5! (or 10...Bg7 11.c3 [facilitating the knight on a3 to return to the center via Na3–c2–e3] 11...f5!) 11. c3 Bg7, and so on.

== See also ==
- Connected pawns
- Doubled pawns
- Isolated pawn
- Pawn structure
