= Half-open file =

Chess terminology

Position: c8 black rook, a7 black pawn, b7 black pawn, f7 black pawn, g7 black pawn, h7 black pawn, d5 black pawn, e5 black pawn, e4 white pawn, c3 white pawn, h3 white pawn, a2 white pawn, b2 white pawn, f2 white pawn, g2 white pawn, d1 white rook

Both the c- and d-files are half-open, with each player's rook in position to capitalize.

In chess, a half-open file (or semi-open file) is a file with pawns of only one color. The half-open file can provide a line of attack for a player's rook or queen. A half-open file is generally exploited by the player with no pawns on it.

Many openings, such as the Sicilian Defense, aim to complicate the position. In the main line Sicilian, 1.e4 c5 2.Nf3 d6 (or 2...e6, or 2...Nc6) 3.d4 cxd4 4.Nxd4, White obtains a half-open d-file, but Black can pressure White along the half-open c-file.

In positions where White has no pawns on a file but Black has one pawn or more on that file, the position is considered to be half-opened for White. In cases where Black has no pawns on a file but White has one or more pawns on that file, the position is considered to be half-opened for Black.

A pawn break occurs when a pawn captures or advances in a way that opens or half-opens one or more files. The demolition of the pawn structure is a common theme in positions with half-open files, since doubled pawns or isolated pawns may create half-open files.

== Example ==
Position: b8 black bishop, f8 black rook, g8 black king, b7 black pawn, h7 black pawn, b5 white knight, d5 black pawn, a4 white pawn, c4 black knight, d4 white bishop, e4 black knight, g4 black queen, e3 white pawn, g3 white pawn, a2 white rook, f2 white pawn, g2 white king, h2 white knight, h1 white queen

Black to move

The game Loek van Wely–Judit Polgár, Hoogeveen, 1997 demonstrates the power of half-open files in attacks. Despite having one fewer pawn than White, Black's possession of two powerful half-open files (her rook on the f-file and queen on the g-file) gives her a winning advantage (diagram).

Black played

30... Rxf2+!

and White resigned, anticipating 31.Rxf2 Qxg3+ 32.Kf1 Qxf2#.

== See also ==
- Open file
