= Connected pawns =

Two or more pawns of the same color on adjacent files

Position: a5 white pawn, b5 white pawn, e5 white pawn, h5 white pawn, c4 white pawn, g4 white pawn, e3 white pawn

White's pawns on the a-, b-, and c-files, as well as on the g- and h-files, are connected.

In chess, connected pawns are two or more pawns of the same color on adjacent files, as distinct from isolated pawns. These pawns are instrumental in creating pawn structure because, when diagonally adjacent, like the two rightmost white pawns, they form a pawn chain, where the pawn behind protects the one in front. This is because, while pawns move forward, they attack and defend diagonally upwards, which creates a strong "chain". When attacking these chains, the weak spot is the backmost pawn because it is not protected by any other pawn.

== Discussion ==
Connected pawns that are both passed, i.e., without any enemy pawns in front of them on the same file or adjacent files, are referred to as connected passed pawns. Such pawns can be very strong in the endgame, especially if supported by other pieces. Often the opponent must sacrifice material to prevent one of the pawns from promoting.

Connected passed pawns are usually superior to other passed pawns. An exception is in an opposite-colored bishops endgame with a bishop and two pawns versus a bishop on the opposite color. If the pawns are connected and not beyond their fifth rank, the position is a theoretical draw whereas widely separated pawns would win.

Two connected pawns on the same rank without any friendly pawns on adjacent files are called hanging pawns.

== Connected passed pawns ==
From Burgess

Position: d6 white pawn, c5 white pawn, f3 black rook, b2 black king, h2 white king

White to move wins after 1.c6.

There is a saying that two connected passed pawns on the sixth rank are stronger than a rook. This is true if the other side has nothing but a rook to defend against the pawns (and the defender cannot immediately capture one of the pawns). In this diagram, White wins:

1. c6 Rd3

Similar is 1...Rc3.

2. c7

Also winning is 2.d7 followed by 3.c7.

2... Rc3 3. d7

And one of the pawns will promote.

== See also ==
- Backward pawn
- Doubled pawns
- Isolated pawn
- Pawn structure
