= Isolated pawn =

Pawn without any friendly pawn on adjacent files

Position: a7 black pawn, c7 black pawn, g7 black pawn, d6 black pawn, h6 black pawn, b5 white pawn, h5 white pawn, b4 white pawn, c4 white pawn, e4 white pawn, g4 white pawn

White's e-pawn and Black's a-pawn are isolated.

In chess, an isolated pawn is a pawn that has no friendly pawn on an adjacent file. Isolated pawns are usually a weakness because they cannot be protected by other pawns. The square in front of the pawn may become a good outpost for the opponent to anchor pieces. Isolated pawns most often become weaker in the endgame, as there are fewer pieces available to protect the pawn.

Isolated pawns can, however, provide improved development and associated opportunities for counterplay that offset or even outweigh their weaknesses. The files adjacent to the isolated pawn are either open or half-open, providing two lanes of attack for the rooks and the queen. The absence of adjacent pawns may also aid mobilization of the player's knights and bishops.

An isolated pawn on the d-file is called an isolated queen pawn or simply an isolani. In addition to the open or half-open c- and e-files, the isolated queen pawn can provide good outposts on the c- and e-file squares diagonally forward of the pawn, which are especially favourable for the player's knights. The isolated queen pawn position favours a kingside attack, freeing both the light- and dark-squared bishops due to the absence of friendly pawns on the c- and e-files. Isolated queen pawns, however, suffer from the same weaknesses as other isolated pawns.

Several openings can lead to isolated pawns, such as the French Defence, Nimzo-Indian Defence, Caro–Kann and Queen's Gambit.

== Weakness ==
In the endgame, isolated pawns are a weakness in pawn structure because they cannot be defended by other pawns as with connected pawns. In the diagram above, the white pawn on e4 and the black pawn on a7 are isolated.

Isolated pawns are weak for two reasons. First, the pieces attacking them usually have more flexibility than those defending them. Namely, the attacking pieces enjoy greater freedom to make other threats, while the defending pieces are restricted to the defense of the pawn. A defending piece is said to be "tied down" to the pawn, since it must stay rooted to the spot until the attacking piece has moved.

The second reason is that the square immediately in front of the isolated pawn is weak, often providing an excellent outpost for a knight or other enemy piece, since it is immune to attack by a pawn. Also, an enemy piece on this square cannot be attacked by rooks, except from the sides or rear, since the file it is on is blocked by the isolated pawn. Thus an isolated pawn provides a typical example of what Wilhelm Steinitz called weak squares.

== Isolated queen pawn ==
An isolated queen pawn (IQP), called an isolani, is often a special case. An isolated queen pawn is one on the queen's file (d-file). Its weakness arises from two factors:

- Given the strategic and (usually) tactical importance of control of the centre, the pawn is important enough that the player must consistently defend it, but with no pawns available for its defense, the player must "tie down" a minor or major piece (in the opening, usually the king's knight or the queen) with that task.
- Similarly, when the isolani is on the third or fourth rank, the absence of adjoining pawns prevents the player from attacking or defending the square ahead of it (e.g. for White, squares d4 or d5, respectively). Because these squares are important central squares, the player will frequently be required to keep one or more pieces committed to the square's attack or defense.

The presence of open or half-open king (e-) and queen's bishop (c-) files, however, as well as the outposts (for White) at e5 and c5, enable the player with the IQP favourable attacking chances in the middlegame. Once the game reaches the endgame, the pawn's isolation becomes more of a weakness than a strength. Therefore, the player with the IQP must take advantage of its strength before an endgame is reached. Gallagher (2002) proposed that with four minor pieces each, an IQP is an advantage; with three minor pieces each, it is about even; and with two or fewer minor pieces each, it is a disadvantage. Sacrifice of the pawn by White and blockade of the pawn by Black are common themes.

=== Strategy ===
Kramnik vs. Kasparov, 2000

Position: a8 black rook, d8 black queen, f8 black rook, g8 black king, a7 black pawn, b7 black bishop, d7 black knight, f7 black pawn, g7 black pawn, h7 black pawn, b6 black pawn, e6 black pawn, f6 black knight, g5 white bishop, b4 black bishop, c4 white bishop, d4 white pawn, c3 white knight, f3 white knight, a2 white pawn, b2 white pawn, f2 white pawn, g2 white pawn, h2 white pawn, c1 white rook, d1 white queen, e1 white rook, g1 white king

Position after 12.Rc1. White has an isolated queen pawn but better piece development.

The diagram shows some of the optimum piece placements for both sides in an IQP position.

==== White ====
- has rooks placed on the open c-file and semi-open e-file.
- has a knight ready to jump into the e5-square which the IQP supports. This can be a jumping-off point for an attack.
- has two pieces controlling the weak d5-square in front of the IQP (queen's knight and light-squared bishop).
- has three pieces preparing the thematic d4–d5 advance (queen's knight, light-squared bishop, and queen).
- has pinned the f6-knight against the black queen with the dark-squared bishop on g5 reducing Black's control of the crucial d5-square.

Making use of this arrangement of pieces White may plan to either advance thematically with d4–d5 opening the position and dissolving the IQP, or use the greater activity of his pieces to launch an attack probably making use of the e5-square for a knight and possibly lifting a rook to the kingside. Typically there may also be a sacrifice on e6 or f7. It is important that White try to use the IQP to support an attack or dissolve it before the endgame as it would then become weak. The advance d4–d5 or a tactic forcing Black to capture a piece on e5 and then recapturing with the d4-pawn would be typical ways of achieving this.

==== Black ====
- has three pieces controlling the weak d5-square (king's knight, light-squared bishop, and e6-pawn). This helps to prevent White's thematic d4–d5 advance.
- has the dark-squared bishop pinning White's queen's knight to the e1-rook to reduce White's control of the crucial d5-square.
- has the light-squared bishop well-placed to control the weakened light squares in the centre of the board.

Black may decide to blockade the pawn on d4 with a piece (most likely a knight) or prevent its advance long enough to increase pressure on it until it falls. It is likely Black will try to place rooks on the open c-file and semi-open d-file to increase their activity and to increase the pressure on d4. It is crucial that Black prevents the d4–d5 break or otherwise renders it harmless. Black will try to exchange pieces as much as possible since the fewer the pieces on the board, the weaker the IQP becomes. Black needs to be wary of White using the e5-square to launch an attack, and keep vigilant for sacrifices on e6 and f7.

== See also ==
- Backward pawn
- Doubled pawns
