= Initiative (chess) =

State in chess

Initiative in a chess position belongs to the player who can make threats that cannot be ignored, thus putting the opponent in the position of having to spend turns responding to threats rather than creating new threats. A player with the initiative will often seek to maneuver their pieces into more and more advantageous positions as they launch successive attacks. The player who lacks the initiative may seek to regain it through counterattack.

== Discussion ==
Due to moving first, White starts the game with the initiative, but it can be lost in the opening by accepting a gambit. Players can also lose initiative by making unnecessary moves that allow the opponent to gain tempo, such as superfluous "preventive" (prophylactic) moves intended to guard against certain actions by the opponent, that nonetheless require no specific response by them. The concept of tempo is closely tied to initiative, as players can acquire the initiative or buttress it by gaining a tempo.

The initiative is important in all phases of the game, but more important in the endgame than in the middlegame and more important in the middlegame than in the opening. Having the initiative puts the opponent on the defensive.

Grandmaster Larry Evans considers four elements of chess: pawn structure, force (material), space (controlling the center and piece mobility), and time. Time is measured in tempi. Having a time advantage is having the initiative. The initiative should be kept as long as possible and only given up for another advantage.

== See also ==
- First move advantage in chess
- Tempo (chess)
- Sente
