= Doubled pawns =

Term in chess for pawns of the same color on the same file

Position: e8 black king, c7 black pawn, g7 black pawn, b6 black pawn, e6 black pawn, h6 black pawn, b5 white pawn, e5 white pawn, h5 white pawn, b4 white pawn, c4 white pawn, g4 white pawn, e3 white pawn, e1 white king

White's pawns on the b-file and on the e-file are doubled.

In chess, doubled pawns are two pawns of the same color residing on the same file. Pawns can become doubled only when one pawn captures onto a file on which another friendly pawn resides. In the diagram, the white pawns on the b-file and e-file are doubled. The pawns on the e-file are doubled and isolated.

In most cases, doubled pawns are considered a weakness due to their inability to defend each other. This inability, in turn, makes it more difficult to achieve a breakthrough which could create a passed pawn (often a deciding factor in endgames). In the case of isolated doubled pawns, these problems are only further aggravated. Several chess strategies and openings are based on burdening the opponent with doubled pawns, a strategic weakness.

There are cases where accepting doubled pawns can be advantageous, however, because doing so may open up a file for a rook, or because the doubled pawns perform a useful function, such as defending important squares or supporting other pawns adjacently above. Also, if the opponent is unable to effectively attack the pawns, their inherent weakness may be of little or no consequence. There are also a number of openings that accept doubled pawns in exchange for some prevailing advantage, such as the Two Knights Variation of Alekhine's Defense.

== Tripled and quadrupled pawns ==
Tripled pawns
Kavalek vs. Fischer, 1967

Position: a8 black rook, c8 black bishop, e8 black king, h8 black rook, e7 black bishop, a6 black pawn, c6 black pawn, e6 black pawn, e5 black pawn, h5 black pawn, a4 black queen, c4 white pawn, e4 black pawn, b3 white rook, a2 white pawn, d2 white queen, e2 white bishop, g2 white pawn, h2 white pawn, f1 white rook, g1 white king

Position after 19...fxe4
Quadrupled pawns
Kovács vs. Barth, 1994

Position: c6 black knight, g6 black king, h6 black pawn, c5 white pawn, c4 white pawn, d4 white bishop, h4 white king, c3 white pawn, c2 white pawn

Final position, Black to move, draw

It is possible to have tripled pawns (or more). Tripled pawns are sometimes referred to as an Irish Pawn Center. The diagram shows a position from Lubomir Kavalek–Bobby Fischer, Sousse Interzonal 1967. The pawns remained tripled at the end of the game on move 28 (a draw).

Quadrupled pawns occurred in the game Alexander Alekhine–Vladimir Nenarokov, 1907, in John van der Wiel–Vlastimil Hort, 1981, and in other games. The longest lasting case of quadrupled pawns was in the game Kovács–Barth, Balatonberény 1994, lasting 23 moves. The final position was drawn, demonstrating the weakness of the extra pawns (see diagram).

== Types of doubled pawns ==
from Berliner

Position: e8 black king, b7 black pawn, a6 black pawn, e6 black pawn, f6 black pawn, h6 black pawn, b3 white pawn, c3 white pawn, f3 white pawn, h3 white pawn, b2 white pawn, f2 white pawn, h2 white pawn, e1 white king

Different types of doubled pawns

There are different types of doubled pawns (see diagram). A doubled pawn is weak because of four considerations:

1. A lack of mobility - to move both pawns forward requires two separate moves, which can lose a tempo.
2. The inability to act as a normal pawn.
3. The likelihood that it cannot be exchanged for an opposing normal pawn - they can only operate behind each other on one file.
4. The vulnerability to attack, as the front pawn cannot be defended from behind by a rook or queen.

The doubled pawns on the b-file are in the best situation; the f-file pawns are next. Doubled h-file pawns are the worst possible scenario because two pawns are held back by one opposing pawn with no scope on the right of the board, so the second pawn has little value (Berliner 1999:18–20). For more discussion see Chess piece relative value.

== See also ==
- Backward pawn
- Connected pawns
- Isolated pawn
- Passed pawn
- Pawn structure
- Shogi, in which doubled unpromoted pawns are not allowed
