= Outpost (chess) =

Chess term

Anand vs. Ivanchuk, Amber, 2001

Position: d8 white rook, e8 black knight, a7 white rook, a6 black pawn, e6 black rook, f6 black pawn, g6 black king, h6 black pawn, a5 white pawn, b5 black rook, c5 black pawn, e5 black pawn, g5 black pawn, b4 black pawn, c4 white knight, b3 white pawn, f3 white pawn, h3 white pawn, c2 white pawn, f2 white king, g2 white pawn

The white knight on c4 occupies a powerful outpost, defending the pawn on a5 and attacking the d6 square.

In chess, an outpost is a square protected by a pawn (or rarely, two pawns) on the player's fourth, fifth, sixth, or seventh rank and which cannot be attacked by an opponent's pawn. Such a square is a hole for the opponent (Hooper & Whyld 1992). In the figure to the right, c4 is an outpost, occupied by White's knight. It cannot be attacked by Black's pawns – there is no pawn on the d-file and Black's pawn on the b-file is too far advanced.

Outposts are a favourable position from which one can launch an attack, particularly using a knight. An outpost is even more effective where it is difficult to trade off with an equal valued piece, e.g., if the opponent only has a bishop of the opposite color to the outpost square's color.

Knights are most efficient when they are close to the enemy's stronghold. This is because of their short reach, something not true of bishops, rooks and queens. They are also more effective in the centre of the board than on the edges. Therefore, the ideal to be aimed at is an outpost in one of the central (c-, d-, e- or f-) files in an advanced position (e.g. the sixth rank) with a knight. Knowledge of outposts and their effectiveness is crucial in exploiting situations involving an isolated queen's pawn.

On the other hand, Nimzowitsch argued when the outpost is in one of the flank (a-, b-, g- and h-) files the ideal piece to make use of the outpost is a rook. This is because the rook can put pressure on all the squares along the rank.

A bishop on an outpost can also be powerful in its own right. Unlike knights and rooks, bishops also defend the pawns that protect them. Because of this, the outpost cannot be undermined by capturing the supporting pawn (unless there is another piece supporting it), as the bishop would simply recapture.
