= Pawn structure =

Configuration of pawns on a chessboard

In a game of chess, the pawn structure (sometimes known as the pawn skeleton) is the configuration of pawns on the chessboard. Because pawns are the least mobile of the chess pieces, the pawn structure is relatively static and thus plays a large role in determining the strategic character of the position.

== General observations ==
Weaknesses in the pawn structure, such as isolated, doubled, or backward pawns and holes, once created, are usually permanent. Care must therefore be taken to avoid them (but there are exceptions—for instance see Boleslavsky hole below). In the absence of these structural weaknesses, it is not possible to assess a pawn formation as good or bad—much depends on the position of the pieces. The pawn formation, however, does determine the overall strategies of the players to a large extent, even if arising from unrelated openings. Pawn formations symmetrical about a vertical line (such as the e5-chain and the d5-chain) may appear similar, but they tend to have entirely different characteristics because of the propensity of the kings to castle on the kingside.

Pawn structures often transpose into one another, such as the isolani into the hanging pawns, and vice versa. Such transpositions must be considered carefully and often mark shifts in game strategy.

== The major pawn formations ==
In his 1995 book Pawn Structure Chess, Andrew Soltis classified the major pawn formations into 17 categories. In 2015, the book Chess Structures, by Mauricio Flores Rios, further studied the subject, subdividing pawn structures into the 28 most important. For a formation to fall into a particular category, it need not have a pawn position identical to the corresponding diagram, but only close enough that the character of the game and the major themes are unchanged. It is typically the center pawns whose position influences the nature of the game the most.

Structures with mutually attacking pawns are said to have tension. They are ordinarily unstable and tend to transpose into a stable formation with a pawn push or exchange. Play often revolves around making the transposition happen under favorable circumstances. For instance, in the Queen's Gambit Declined, Black waits until White develops the king's bishop to make the d5xc4 capture, transposing to the Slav formation (see below).

=== Caro formation ===
Position: a7 black pawn, b7 black pawn, f7 black pawn, g7 black pawn, h7 black pawn, c6 black pawn, e6 black pawn, d4 white pawn, a2 white pawn, b2 white pawn, c2 white pawn, f2 white pawn, g2 white pawn, h2 white pawn

The Caro formation

Openings: Primary: Caro–Kann. Other: French, Scandinavian (in the main line where White has to get the queen back from a5), Trompowsky (colors reversed), Alekhine's.

Character: Slow-paced game.

Themes for White: Outpost on e5, kingside space advantage, d4–d5 break, possibility of queenside majority in the endgame (typically after the exchange of White's d-pawn for Black's c-pawn).

Themes for Black: Weakness of the d4-pawn, c6–c5 and e6–e5 breaks. The latter break is usually preferable, but harder for Black to achieve.

=== Slav formation ===
Position: a7 black pawn, b7 black pawn, f7 black pawn, g7 black pawn, h7 black pawn, c6 black pawn, e6 black pawn, d4 white pawn, e3 white pawn, a2 white pawn, b2 white pawn, f2 white pawn, g2 white pawn, h2 white pawn

The Slav formation

Openings: Primary: Queen's Gambit. Other: Catalan, Nimzo-Indian, Colle System, London System, and Trompowsky (with the latter three having their colors reversed).

Character: Slow-paced game.

Themes for White: Pressure on the c-file, weakness of Black's c-pawn (either after Black's ...b7–b5 or after d4–d5xc6 in response to ...e6–e5), the d4–d5 break.

Themes for Black: e6–e5 and c6–c5 breaks.

=== Sicilian – Scheveningen ===
Position: a7 black pawn, b7 black pawn, f7 black pawn, g7 black pawn, h7 black pawn, d6 black pawn, e6 black pawn, e4 white pawn, a2 white pawn, b2 white pawn, c2 white pawn, f2 white pawn, g2 white pawn, h2 white pawn

The Scheveningen formation

Openings: Primary: Sicilian (Najdorf, Richter–Rauzer and Sozin variations), Sicilian Scheveningen, and several other Sicilian variations. Other: King's English (colors reversed).

Character: Complex, dynamic, sharp middlegame.

Themes for White: Pressure on the d-file, space advantage, e4–e5 break (often prepared with f2–f4), f2–f4–f5 push, g2–g4–g5 blitz (see Keres Attack).

Themes for Black: Pressure on the c-file, minority attack (and counterplay in general) on the queenside, pressure on White's pawn on e4 or e5, d6–d5 break, e6–e5 transposing into the Boleslavsky hole (see below).

It used to be considered unwise for White to exchange a piece on c6 allowing the recapture bxc6, because the phalanx of Black's center pawns was thought to become very strong; however modern chess engines have shown ways for White to maintain a slight advantage even with Black's pawn on c6.

=== Sicilian – Dragon ===
Position: a7 black pawn, b7 black pawn, e7 black pawn, f7 black pawn, h7 black pawn, d6 black pawn, g6 black pawn, e4 white pawn, a2 white pawn, b2 white pawn, c2 white pawn, f2 white pawn, g2 white pawn, h2 white pawn

The Dragon formation

Openings: Primary: Sicilian Dragon. Other: Pirc, King's English (with colors reversed).

Character: Either a razor sharp middlegame with opposite side castling or a moderately sharp game with same side castling. The Sicilian Dragon requires a high level of opening memorization to play properly. This is especially true when it comes to the Yugoslav Attack in which White plays the moves Be3, f3, Qd2 and 0-0-0. Other variations include the following: the Classical Dragon, where White plays Be2 and 0-0; the Tal Attack, defined by Bc4 and 0-0; and the Fianchetto Defense, where White plays g3, Bg2 and 0-0. These less common variations lead to less tactical positions, with a potentially technical endgame.

Themes for White: Outpost on d5, kingside attack (either f2–f4–f5 with kingside castling or h2–h4–h5 with queenside castling), weakness of Black's queenside pawn minority in the endgame.

Themes for Black: Pressure on the long diagonal, queenside counterplay, exploiting White's often overextended kingside pawns in the endgame, d6–d5 break.

Opening Lines: The most common variation of the Sicilian Dragon is the Yugoslav Attack. 1. e4 c5 2.Nf3 d6 3. d4 cxd4 4. Nxd4 Nf6 5. Nc3 g6 6. Be3 (the defining move of the Yugoslav attack) 6... Bg7 7. Qd2 0-0 8. f3 (necessary to prevent Black from playing 8...Ng4 to attack White's dark-squared bishop; 8.f3 also gives e4 extra defense and prepares to launch a pawn storm with the move g4) 8... Nc6 9. 0-0-0 (9.Bc4 is also a very common move in this position) 9... d5 (the main line; other ideas include 9...Nxd4 and 9...Bd7).

=== Boleslavsky hole ===
Position: a7 black pawn, b7 black pawn, f7 black pawn, g7 black pawn, h7 black pawn, d6 black pawn, e5 black pawn, e4 white pawn, a2 white pawn, b2 white pawn, c2 white pawn, f2 white pawn, g2 white pawn, h2 white pawn

The Boleslavsky hole formation

Openings: Primary: Sicilian Najdorf, Classical, Sveshnikov, Kalashnikov. Other: Sicilian Prins, Moscow, O'Kelly (2...a6), King's Indian, King's English (with colors reversed), Pirc, Philidor, Ruy Lopez (Spanish), Italian.

Character: Open, dynamic game.

Themes for White: Taking control of the d5 hole, exploiting the backward d6-pawn, f2–f4 break.

Themes for Black: d6–d5 break, queenside minority attack, the c4-square.

It is a paradoxical idea that Black can strive for equality by voluntarily creating a hole on d5. The entire game revolves around control of the d5-square. Black must play very carefully or White will place a knight on d5 and obtain a commanding positional advantage. Black almost always equalizes, and might even obtain a slight edge, if the d6–d5 break can be made. Black has two options for their queen's bishop: on e6 and on b7 (after a7–a6 and b7–b5). Unusually for an open formation, bishops become inferior to knights because of the overarching importance of d5: White will often exchange Bg5xf6, and Black usually prefers to give up their queen's bishop rather than a knight in exchange for a white knight if it gets to d5. This formation can be reached from the d5-chain formation after Black gets the c7–c6 break and exchanges the c-pawn for White's d-pawn.

When White castles queenside, Black often delays castling because their king is quite safe in the center.

=== Maróczy Bind ===
Position: a7 black pawn, b7 black pawn, e7 black pawn, f7 black pawn, g7 black pawn, h7 black pawn, d6 black pawn, c4 white pawn, e4 white pawn, a2 white pawn, b2 white pawn, f2 white pawn, g2 white pawn, h2 white pawn

The Maróczy bind formation with a pawn on d6

Position: a7 black pawn, b7 black pawn, d7 black pawn, f7 black pawn, g7 black pawn, h7 black pawn, e6 black pawn, c4 white pawn, e4 white pawn, a2 white pawn, b2 white pawn, f2 white pawn, g2 white pawn, h2 white pawn

The Maróczy bind formation with a pawn on e6

Openings: Primary: Sicilian, King's Indian Defense. Other: Symmetrical English, King's English (with colors reversed), Queen's Indian Defense, Nimzo-Indian Defense.

Character: Semi-open game.

Themes for White: Nd4–c2–e3, fianchettoing one or both bishops, the Maróczy hop (Nc3–d5 followed by e4xd5 with terrific pressure on the e-file), kingside attack, c4–c5 and e4–e5 breaks.

Themes for Black: b7–b5 break, f7–f5 break (especially with a fianchettoed king's bishop), d6–d5 break (prepared with e7–e6).

The Maróczy bind, named after Géza Maróczy, has a fearsome reputation. Chess masters once believed that allowing the bind was a mistake as Black always gave White a significant advantage. Indeed, if Black does not quickly make a pawn break, their minor pieces will suffocate, with minor pieces lacking any squares to move to and possibly becoming cornered or pressed into a weak defense. Conversely, the formation takes time to set up and limits the activity of White's light-squared bishop, which can buy Black some breathing room to accomplish this break.

=== Hedgehog ===
Position: f7 black pawn, g7 black pawn, h7 black pawn, a6 black pawn, b6 black pawn, d6 black pawn, e6 black pawn, c4 white pawn, e4 white pawn, a2 white pawn, b2 white pawn, f2 white pawn, g2 white pawn, h2 white pawn

The Hedgehog formation

Openings: Primary: Symmetrical English, Sicilian. Other: King's English (with colors reversed), King's Indian Defense (Sämisch), Queen's Indian Defense, Nimzo-Indian Defense, Nimzo–Larsen Attack.

Character: Closed, Semi-open game.

The Hedgehog is a formation similar to the Maróczy bind, and shares the strategic ideas with that formation. Typically, the Maróczy bind would transpose into the Hedgehog formation.

=== Rauzer formation ===
Position: a7 black pawn, b7 black pawn, f7 black pawn, g7 black pawn, h7 black pawn, c6 black pawn, e5 black pawn, c4 white pawn, e4 white pawn, a2 white pawn, b2 white pawn, f2 white pawn, g2 white pawn, h2 white pawn

The Rauzer formation (colors reversed)

Openings: Primary: King's Indian, Old Indian, Ruy Lopez (colors reversed), Italian Game. Sicilian Kramnik. The notation in the rest of this section refers to the version with the colors reversed.

Character: Semi-open game.

Themes for White: d6 weakness, c4–c5 push, a3–f8 diagonal, queenside pawn storm.

Themes for Black: d4 weakness, a1–h8 diagonal, f4-square, kingside attack, trading pieces for a superior endgame.

The Rauzer formation is named after Rauzer who introduced it in the Ruy Lopez. It can also rarely occur in the Ruy Lopez with colors reversed.

Position: a8 black rook, c8 black bishop, e8 black rook, g8 black king, a7 black pawn, b7 black pawn, d7 black knight, f7 black pawn, g7 black bishop, h7 black pawn, c6 black pawn, d6 white rook, f6 black knight, g6 black pawn, e5 black pawn, c4 white pawn, e4 white pawn, c3 white knight, e3 white bishop, f3 white knight, h3 white pawn, a2 white pawn, b2 white pawn, f2 white pawn, g2 white pawn, c1 white king, f1 white bishop, h1 white rook

Tarrasch vs. Euwe, Pistyan 1922

It is considered to give Black excellent chances because d6 is much less of a hole than White's d4. If the black king's bishop is fianchettoed it is common to see it undeveloped to f8 to control the vital c5- and d6-squares, or remove White's dark-squared bishop, the guardian of the hole.

The Rauzer formation is often misjudged by beginners. In the diagrammed game position, White appears to have a development lead while Black's position appears to be riddled with holes. In reality, it is Black who stands clearly better, because White has no real way to improve their position while Black can improve by exploiting the d4-square (see complete game on Java (Applet) board).

=== Boleslavsky Wall ===
Position: a7 black pawn, b7 black pawn, f7 black pawn, g7 black pawn, h7 black pawn, c6 black pawn, d6 black pawn, c4 white pawn, e4 white pawn, a2 white pawn, b2 white pawn, f2 white pawn, g2 white pawn, h2 white pawn

The Boleslavsky Wall formation

Openings: Primary: King's Indian. Other: English, Pirc, Ruy Lopez, Philidor, Italian Game.

Character: Semi-open game, slow buildup.

Occurs after exchange of pawns on d4. Name given by Hans Kmoch.

Themes for White: Exploitation of d6 weakness, e4–e5 and c4–c5 breaks, minority attack with b2–b4–b5.

Themes for Black: Attacking the e4- and c4-pawns, d6–d5 and f7–f5 breaks, queenside play with a7–a5–a4.

The wall is yet another structure that leaves Black with a d-pawn weakness, but prevents White from taking control of the center and gives Black active piece play and an opportunity to play on either side of the board.

=== d5-chain ===
Position: a7 black pawn, b7 black pawn, c7 black pawn, f7 black pawn, g7 black pawn, h7 black pawn, d6 black pawn, d5 white pawn, e5 black pawn, e4 white pawn, a2 white pawn, b2 white pawn, c2 white pawn, f2 white pawn, g2 white pawn, h2 white pawn

The d5-chain formation

Openings: Primary: King's Indian, Ruy Lopez (Spanish), Pirc. Other: Benoni, Philidor, Trompowsky, English, Italian Game, Four Knights Game (Scotch variation).

Character: Closed game with opposite side activity.

Themes for White: Massive queenside space advantage, c2–c4–c5 break (optionally prepared with b2–b4), prophylaxis with g2–g4 (after f2–f3), f2–f4 break.

Themes for Black: Kingside attack, f7–f5 break, g7–g5–g4 break (after f2–f3), c7–c6 break, prophylaxis with c6–c5 or c7–c5 transposing to a full Benoni formation.

The chain arises from a variety of openings but most commonly in the heavily analyzed King's Indian Classical variation. The theme is a race for a breakthrough on opposite flanks – Black must try to whip up a kingside attack before White's heavy pieces penetrate with devastating effect on the c-file. The position was thought to strongly favor White until a seminal game (Taimanov–Najdorf 1953) where Black introduced the maneuver Rf8–f7, Bg7–f8, Rf7–g7. When the chain arises in the Ruy Lopez, play is much slower with tempo being of little value and featuring piece maneuvering by both sides, Black focusing on the c7–c6 break and White often trying to play on the kingside with the f2–f4 break. This may transpose into the Boleslavsky hole formation or the Maróczy Bind after Black plays the c7–c6 break and exchanges the c-pawn for White's d-pawn.

=== e5-chain ===
Position: a7 black pawn, b7 black pawn, c7 black pawn, f7 black pawn, g7 black pawn, h7 black pawn, e6 black pawn, d5 black pawn, e5 white pawn, d4 white pawn, a2 white pawn, b2 white pawn, c2 white pawn, f2 white pawn, g2 white pawn, h2 white pawn

The e5-chain formation

Openings: Primary: French. Other: Nimzowitsch, Trompowsky, Caro–Kann (Advance Variation), Bogo-Indian, London System, Colle System, Sicilian (Rossolimo, Alapin, Closed, O'Kelly), Nimzo–Larsen Attack (colors reversed), King's English (colors reversed).

Character: Closed/semi-open but sharp game.

Themes for White: Kingside mating attack, f2–f4–f5 break.

Themes for Black: Exchanging the hemmed-in queen's bishop, c7–c5 and f7–f6 breaks.

Due to White's kingside space advantage and development advantage, Black must generate counterplay or be mated. Novices often lose to the sparkling Greek gift sacrifice. Attacking the head of the pawn chain with f7–f6 is seen as frequently as attacking its base, because it is harder for White to defend the head of the chain than in the d5-chain. In response to exf6, Black accepts a backward e6-pawn in exchange for freeing their position (the b8–h2 diagonal and the semi-open f-file) and the possibility of a further e6–e5 break. If White exchanges with d4xc5 it is called the Wedge formation. White gets an outpost on d4 and the possibility of exploiting the dark squares while Black gets an overextended e5-pawn to work on.

=== Modern Benoni formation ===
Position: a7 black pawn, b7 black pawn, f7 black pawn, g7 black pawn, h7 black pawn, d6 black pawn, c5 black pawn, d5 white pawn, e4 white pawn, a2 white pawn, b2 white pawn, f2 white pawn, g2 white pawn, h2 white pawn

The Modern Benoni formation

Openings: Primary: Modern Benoni, King's Indian Defence, Ruy Lopez. Other: Italian Game, Modern Defense, Queen's Indian Defense, Trompowsky, Ruy Lopez (colors reversed), Italian Game (colors reversed), Réti Opening (colors reversed), King's Indian Attack (colors reversed), Sicilian Defense (Moscow, Rossolimo).

Character: Semi-open game.

Themes for White: Central pawn majority, e4–e5 break. Weak d6 pawn.

Themes for Black: Queenside pawn majority. e5 control. b7–b5, normally prepared by playing a7–a6 to support the advance. The b7–b6 is also possible, prior to b5, to prevent White from playing a2–a4–a5 which would stop b7–b5 since it would be able to capture en passant. c5–c4, sometimes as a sacrifice of a pawn, to clear the c5-square for a piece (normally a knight). Sometimes, Black can choose to play with a fianchetto of the dark square bishop by playing g7–g6 and Bg7. This bishop would control key squares like e5, and can be exchanged on c3 for a knight.

=== Giuoco Piano – Isolani formation ===
Position: a7 black pawn, b7 black pawn, c7 black pawn, f7 black pawn, g7 black pawn, h7 black pawn, d4 white pawn, a2 white pawn, b2 white pawn, f2 white pawn, g2 white pawn, h2 white pawn

The Isolani formation in the Giuoco Piano

Openings: Primary: Giuoco Piano. Other: French (Steiner, Exchange), Ruy Lopez (Berlin, Møller, Anti-Marshall), Petrov, King's English, French (colors reversed), Sicilian Alapin (colors reversed), Queen's Gambit Accepted (3.e3 variation).

Character: Open game.

Themes for White: Developing active piece play or piece activity on one or both of the open files adjacent to the isolated queen pawn. Maintaining control over the weak square in front of the isolated queen pawn as it advances to prevent enemy blockade with the ultimate threat and goal of promotion.

Themes for Black: Blockading the isolani, trading pieces for a favorable endgame.

=== Queen's Gambit – Isolani formation ===
Position: a7 black pawn, b7 black pawn, f7 black pawn, g7 black pawn, h7 black pawn, e6 black pawn, d4 white pawn, a2 white pawn, b2 white pawn, f2 white pawn, g2 white pawn, h2 white pawn

The Isolani formation in the Queen's Gambit

Openings: Primary: Queen's Gambit, Nimzo-Indian. Other: French, Sicilian Alapin, Symmetrical English, Caro–Kann, Queen's Gambit (colors reversed), Nimzo-Indian (colors reversed).

Character: Open game.

Themes for White: d4–d5 break, sacrifice of the isolani, outpost on e5, kingside attack.

Themes for Black: Blockading the isolani, trading pieces for a favorable endgame.

The isolani leads to lively play revolving around the d5-square. If Black can clamp down on the pawn, their positional strengths and threat of exchanges give them the advantage. If not, the threat of the d4–d5 break is ever-present, and the isolani can sometimes be sacrificed to unleash the potential of White's pieces, enabling White to whip up a whirlwind attack. Garry Kasparov is famous for the speculative d4–d5 sacrifice.

Bogolyubov vs. Rosenthal, 1914

Position: c8 black rook, d8 black queen, e8 black king, f8 black bishop, h8 black rook, a7 black pawn, b7 black pawn, f7 black pawn, g7 black pawn, c6 black knight, e6 black bishop, f6 black knight, h6 black pawn, d5 black pawn, d4 black pawn, b3 white pawn, c3 white knight, f3 white knight, g3 white pawn, a2 white pawn, b2 white bishop, e2 white pawn, f2 white pawn, g2 white bishop, h2 white pawn, a1 white rook, d1 white queen, f1 white rook, g1 white king

White achieved a blockade with 11.Nb5!
Magerramov vs. Kasparov, 1977

Position: a8 black rook, d8 black queen, f8 black rook, g8 black king, a7 black pawn, f7 black pawn, g7 black pawn, b6 black pawn, c6 black bishop, e6 black knight, h6 black pawn, d5 black pawn, c3 white knight, e3 white pawn, a2 white pawn, b2 white pawn, d2 white rook, f2 white pawn, g2 white pawn, h2 white pawn, d1 white queen, e1 white king, f1 white bishop, h1 white rook

Black obtained a devastating attack with 17...d4!

=== Hanging pawns ===
Position: a7 black pawn, b7 black pawn, f7 black pawn, g7 black pawn, h7 black pawn, e6 black pawn, c4 white pawn, d4 white pawn, a2 white pawn, f2 white pawn, g2 white pawn, h2 white pawn

A hanging pawns formation

Openings: Primary: Queen's Gambit Declined, Nimzo-Indian. Other: Queen's Indian Defense, Symmetrical English, Sicilian (Alapin).

Character: Open game.

Themes for White: Line opening advance in the center, kingside attack.

Themes for Black: Forcing a pawn advance and blockading the pair, conversion to isolani.

The term is used almost exclusively for pawns on the c- and d-files, and usually for two pawns on the same rank (side by side). They can be a strength, a weakness or neutral, depending on the position. They are typically an attacking rather than a defensive asset. Like the isolani, the hanging pawns are a structural weakness but with them usually comes increased piece activity to compensate. The play revolves around Black trying to force one of the pawns to advance. If Black can establish a permanent blockade the game is positionally won. On the other hand, White aims to keep the pawns hanging, trying to generate a kingside attack leveraging off of their superior center control. Other themes for White include tactical possibilities and line opening breaks in the center.

=== Carlsbad formation ===
Position: a7 black pawn, b7 black pawn, f7 black pawn, g7 black pawn, h7 black pawn, c6 black pawn, d5 black pawn, d4 white pawn, e3 white pawn, a2 white pawn, b2 white pawn, f2 white pawn, g2 white pawn, h2 white pawn

The Carlsbad formation

Openings: Primary: Queen's Gambit Declined. Other: Caro–Kann (colors reversed), Colle System (colors reversed), London System (colors reversed).

Character: Semi-open game.

Themes for White: Minority attack on the queenside. e3–e4 break, sometimes prepared with f2–f3. e5 outpost, sometimes supported with f2–f4.

Themes for Black: e4 outpost, kingside attack.

=== Panov formation ===
Position: a7 black pawn, b7 black pawn, f7 black pawn, g7 black pawn, h7 black pawn, e6 black pawn, c5 white pawn, d5 black pawn, d4 white pawn, a2 white pawn, b2 white pawn, f2 white pawn, g2 white pawn, h2 white pawn

The Panov formation

Openings: Primary: Queen's Gambit Declined, Caro–Kann (Panov Attack). Other: Alekhine Defense, QGD Tarrasch Defense (colors reversed), Symmetrical English (colors reversed).

Character: Semi-open, dynamic game.

Themes for White: Exploiting the dark squares, d6 outpost; queenside majority in the endgame, with an advanced pawn.

Themes for Black: e4 outpost, kingside attack, White's overextended pawn, e6–e5 and b7–b6 breaks.

=== Stonewall formation ===
Position: a7 black pawn, b7 black pawn, c7 black pawn, g7 black pawn, h7 black pawn, e6 black pawn, d5 black pawn, f5 black pawn, d4 white pawn, f4 white pawn, e3 white pawn, a2 white pawn, b2 white pawn, c2 white pawn, g2 white pawn, h2 white pawn

The Stonewall formation

Openings: Primary: Dutch Defense, Stonewall Attack. Other: Colle System, Bird's Opening.

Character: Closed game, uncomplicated strategy.

Themes: Exchanging the bad bishop, e4/e5 outposts, breaks on the c- and g-files.

Players must carefully consider how to recapture on the e4/e5-square, since it alters the symmetric pawn formation and creates strategic subtleties.

=== Botvinnik system ===
Position: a7 black pawn, b7 black pawn, f7 black pawn, g7 black pawn, h7 black pawn, d6 black pawn, c5 black pawn, e5 black pawn, c4 white pawn, e4 white pawn, d3 white pawn, a2 white pawn, b2 white pawn, f2 white pawn, g2 white pawn, h2 white pawn

The Botvinnik system

Openings: Primary: English, Dutch, King's Indian Attack. Other: Sicilian (Closed, Moscow), Vienna Game, Ruy Lopez, Bishop's Opening.

Character: Closed game, uncomplicated strategy.

Themes: Exchanging the bad bishop, d4/d5 outposts, breaks on the b- and f-files.

This structure appears in one of Botvinnik's treatments of the English. Players must carefully consider how to recapture on the d4/d5-square, since it alters the symmetric pawn formation and creates strategic subtleties. Adding the typical White fianchetto of the king's bishop to this structure provides significant pressure along the long diagonal, and usually prepares the f2–f4–f5 break.

=== Closed Sicilian formation ===
Position: a7 black pawn, b7 black pawn, e7 black pawn, f7 black pawn, g7 black pawn, h7 black pawn, d6 black pawn, c5 black pawn, e4 white pawn, d3 white pawn, a2 white pawn, b2 white pawn, c2 white pawn, f2 white pawn, g2 white pawn, h2 white pawn

The Closed Sicilian formation

Openings: Primary: Closed Sicilian, Closed English (colors reversed).

Character: Closed, complicated position.

Themes for White: Kingside pawn storm, c2–c3 and d3–d4 break.

Themes for Black: Queenside pawn storm, a1–h8 diagonal.

== See also ==
- Backward pawn
- Chess opening
- Chess strategy
- Chess terminology
- Connected pawns
- Doubled pawns
- Isolated pawn
- Hedgehog (chess)
- Outline of chess § Pawn structure
