= Pawn (chess) =

Chess piece

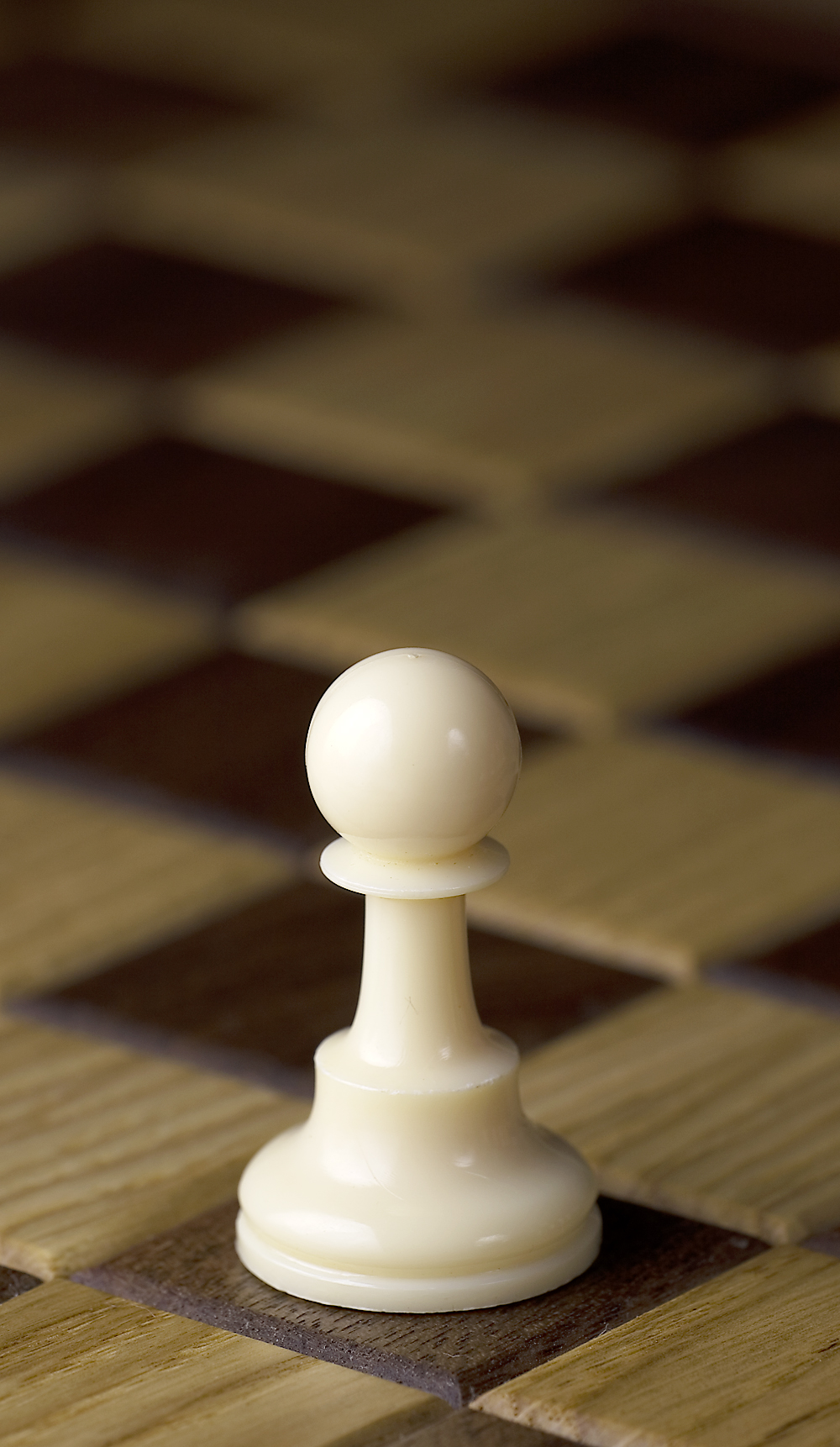
White pawn

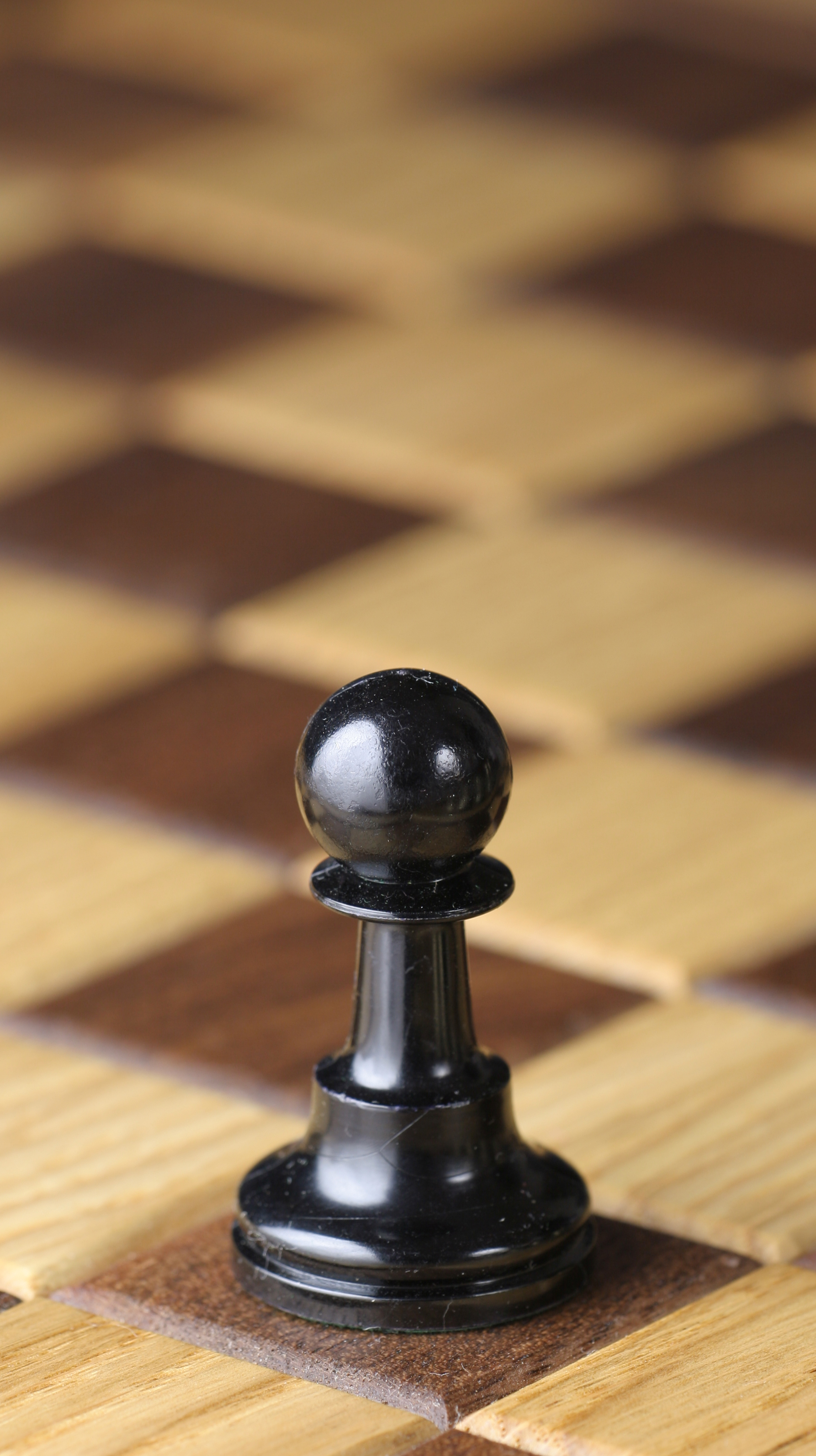
Black pawn

The pawn (♙, ♟) is the most numerous and weakest piece in the game of chess. It can move one vacant square directly forward, or one or two vacant squares directly forward on its first move, and can capture one square diagonally forward. Each player begins a game with eight pawns, one on each square of their second rank. The white pawns start on a2 through h2, while the black pawns start on a7 through h7.

Individual pawns are often referred to by the file on which they stand. For example, one speaks of "White's f-pawn" or "Black's b-pawn". It is also common to refer to a rook pawn, meaning any pawn on the a- or h-files, a knight pawn (on the b- or g-files), a bishop pawn (on the c- or f-files), a queen pawn (on the d-file), a king pawn (on the e-file), and a central pawn (on the d- or e-files).

== Placement and movement ==
Position: a7 black pawn, b7 black pawn, c7 black pawn, d7 black pawn, e7 black pawn, f7 black pawn, g7 black pawn, h7 black pawn, a2 white pawn, b2 white pawn, c2 white pawn, d2 white pawn, e2 white pawn, f2 white pawn, g2 white pawn, h2 white pawn

Initial placement of the pawns

Position: g7 black pawn, a6 black pawn, g6 black circle, a5 black circle, c5 white circle, g5 black circle, c4 white pawn, e4 white circle, e3 white circle, e2 white pawn

A pawn can move to the square directly in front of itself if that square is not occupied. A pawn on its starting rank has the option of moving two squares in one turn.

Each player begins the game with eight pawns placed along their second rank.

A pawn may move by vertically advancing to a vacant square ahead. The first time a pawn moves, it has the additional option of vertically advancing two squares, provided that both squares are vacant. Unlike other pieces, the pawn can only move forwards. In the second diagram, the pawn on c4 can move to c5, and the pawn on e2 can move to either e3 or e4.

=== Capturing ===
Unlike other pieces, the pawn does not capture in the same way that it moves. A pawn captures by moving diagonally forward one square to the left or right, either replacing an enemy piece on its square (first diagram) or capturing en passant (second diagram).

Example of regular capturing

Position: c6 black rook, d6 black bishop, e6 black knight, d5 white pawn

The pawn may capture either the rook or the knight, but not the bishop, which blocks the pawn from moving directly forward.
Example of capturing en passant

Position: c7 black circle, c6 black cross, c5 black pawn, d5 white pawn

The black pawn has just moved from c7 to c5. The white pawn can capture it en passant by moving to c6.

==== En passant ====
An en passant (French: [ɑ̃ paˈsɑ̃], lit. "in passing") capture can occur after a pawn moves two squares and the square it passes over is attacked by an enemy pawn. The enemy pawn is entitled to capture the moved pawn "in passing" as if the latter had advanced only one square. The capturing pawn moves to the square over which the moved pawn passed, removing it from the board.

An en passant capture can only be done on the move immediately following the double-step pawn advance. It is the only capture in which the capturing piece does not move to the square of the captured piece.

=== Promotion ===
A pawn that advances to its last rank is promoted to a queen, rook, bishop, or knight of the same color. The pawn is replaced by the new piece on the same move. The choice of promotion is not limited to pieces that have been captured; thus, a player could, in theory, have as many as nine queens, ten rooks, ten bishops, or ten knights on the board. Typically, a pawn is promoted to a queen, the most powerful piece. Promotion to a queen is known as queening, while promotion to any other piece is known as underpromotion. Reasons for underpromotion include tactical positions involving a knight check, and avoiding stalemate.

== Strategy ==
=== Pawn structure ===
Position: a8 black rook, b8 black knight, c8 black bishop, d8 black queen, e8 black king, f8 black bishop, g8 black knight, h8 black rook, a7 black pawn, b7 black pawn, c7 black pawn, f7 black pawn, g7 black pawn, h7 black pawn, e6 black pawn, d5 black pawn, e5 white pawn, d4 white pawn, a2 white pawn, b2 white pawn, c2 white pawn, f2 white pawn, g2 white pawn, h2 white pawn, a1 white rook, b1 white knight, c1 white bishop, d1 white queen, e1 white king, f1 white bishop, g1 white knight, h1 white rook

Locked pawn chains in the French Defense after 1.e4 e6 2.d4 d5 3.e5

The pawn structure, the configuration of pawns on the chessboard, determines the strategic flavor of a game. While other pieces can usually be moved to more favorable positions if they are temporarily badly placed, a poorly positioned pawn often cannot be so relocated. In addition, being the most numerous piece, the pawn structure restricts and directs the piece movements of each side.

Because pawns capture diagonally and can be blocked from advancing, opposing pawns can become locked in diagonal pawn chains of two or more pawns of each color, where each player controls squares of one color. In the diagram, Black and White have locked their d- and e-pawns.

Here, White has a long-term space advantage. White will have an easier time than Black in finding good squares for their pieces, particularly with an eye to the kingside. Black, in contrast, suffers from a bad bishop on c8, which is prevented by the black pawns from finding a good square or helping out on the kingside. On the other hand, White's central pawns are somewhat overextended and vulnerable to attack. Black can undermine the white pawn chain with an immediate ...c5 and perhaps a later ...f6.

=== Isolated pawn ===
Position: a8 black rook, c8 black bishop, d8 black queen, f8 black rook, g8 black king, a7 black pawn, b7 black pawn, f7 black pawn, g7 black pawn, h7 black pawn, c6 black knight, f6 black knight, c5 black bishop, d5 black pawn, d3 white bishop, f3 white knight, h3 white pawn, a2 white pawn, b2 white pawn, c2 white pawn, f2 white pawn, g2 white pawn, a1 white rook, b1 white knight, c1 white bishop, d1 white queen, f1 white rook, g1 white king

Black has an isolated pawn on d5.

Pawns on adjacent files can support each other in attack and defense. A pawn that has no friendly pawns in adjacent files is an isolated pawn. The square in front of an isolated pawn may become an enduring weakness. Any piece placed directly in front not only blocks the advance of that pawn but also cannot be driven away by other pawns.

In the diagram, Black has an isolated pawn on d5. If all the pieces except the kings and pawns were removed, the weakness of that pawn might prove fatal to Black in the endgame. In the middlegame, however, Black has slightly more freedom of movement than White and may be able to trade off the isolated pawn before an endgame ensues.

=== Passed pawn ===
From Fine & Benko

Position: a6 black pawn, e6 black king, b5 black pawn, c5 white pawn, h5 black pawn, b4 white pawn, a3 white pawn, e3 white king

White wins with either side to move.

A pawn that cannot be blocked or captured by enemy pawns in its path to promotion is a passed pawn. Because endgames are often won by the player who can promote a pawn first, having a passed pawn in an endgame can be decisive – especially a protected passed pawn (a passed pawn protected by a pawn). In this vein, a pawn majority, a greater number of pawns belonging to one player on one side of the chessboard, is strategically important because it can often be converted into a passed pawn.

In the diagram, White has a protected passed pawn on c5 and Black has an outside passed pawn on h5. This position might appear roughly equal, because each side has a king and three pawns, and the positions of the kings are about equal. In truth, White wins this endgame on the strength of the protected passed pawn, regardless which player moves first. The black king cannot be on both sides of the board at once – to defend the isolated h-pawn and to stop White's c-pawn from advancing to promotion. Thus White can capture the h-pawn and then win the game.

=== Doubled pawn ===
Position: a8 black rook, c8 black bishop, d8 black king, f8 black bishop, h8 black rook, a7 black pawn, b7 black pawn, c7 black pawn, f7 black pawn, g7 black pawn, h7 black pawn, c6 black pawn, e5 white pawn, f5 black knight, c3 white knight, f3 white knight, a2 white pawn, b2 white pawn, c2 white pawn, f2 white pawn, g2 white pawn, h2 white pawn, a1 white rook, c1 white bishop, f1 white rook, g1 white king

Black has doubled c-pawns.

After a capture with a pawn, a player may end up with two pawns on the same file, called doubled pawns. Doubled pawns are substantially weaker than pawns that are side by side, because they cannot defend each other or both be defended by adjacent pawns, and the front pawn blocks the advance of the back one. In the diagram, the doubled c-pawns are a strategic disadvantage for Black.

There are situations where doubled pawns confer some advantage; for example, the guarding of consecutive squares in a file by the pawns prevents an invasion by the opponent's pieces, and the side with doubled pawns typically has additional open files for rooks.

Pawns that are both doubled and isolated are typically a tangible weakness. A single piece or pawn in front of doubled isolated pawns blocks both of them, and cannot be easily dislodged. It is rare for a player to have three pawns in a file, i.e. tripled pawns.

=== Wrong rook pawn ===
In chess endgames with a bishop, a rook pawn may be the wrong rook pawn, depending on the square-color of the bishop. This causes some positions to be draws that would otherwise be wins.

== Dimensions and design ==
Pawns are the smallest piece on the board, featuring a short, tapered body topped with a small rounded ball or a helmet-like spherical head.

== History ==
The pawn has its origins in the oldest version of chess, chaturanga, and it is present in all other significant versions of the game as well. In chaturanga, this piece could move one square directly forward and could capture one square diagonally forward.

In medieval chess, as an attempt to make the pieces more interesting, each pawn was given the name of a commoner's occupation:

- Gambler and other "lowlifes", also messengers (in the left-most file, that direction being literally sinister)
- City guard or policeman (in front of the left-side knight, as knights trained city guards in real life)
- Innkeeper (in front of the left-side bishop)
- Doctor (in front of the queen)
- Merchant or money changer (in front of the king)
- Weaver/clerk (in front of the right-side bishop, as they worked for bishops)
- Blacksmith (in front of the right-side knight, as they cared for the horses)
- Worker/farmer (in front of the right-side rook, as they worked for castles)

The most famous example of this is found in the second book ever printed in the English language, The Game and Playe of the Chesse. This book, printed by William Caxton, was viewed to be as much a political commentary on society as a chess book.

The ability to move two spaces and the related ability to capture en passant were introduced in 15th-century Europe; the en passant capture spread to various regions throughout its history. The en passant capture intends to prevent a pawn on its initial square from safely bypassing a square controlled by an enemy pawn. The rule for promotion has changed throughout its history.

=== Etymology and word usage ===
The term pawn is derived from the Old French word paon, which comes from the Medieval Latin term for "foot soldier" and is cognate with peon. In most other languages, the word for pawn is similarly derived from paon (e.g., pionek in Polish), its Latin ancestor or some other word for foot soldier. In some languages the term for pawn is a name meaning "peasant" or "farmer", reflecting how the lower orders were conscripted as footsoldiers in wartime: Hungarian paraszt, Slovene kmet, German Bauer, Danish/Norwegian/Swedish bonde, Latvian bandinieks. In Irish, the term fichillín, a diminutive of ficheall ("chess") is sometimes used, though the term "ceithearnach" ("foot soldier") is also used. In Thai the pawn is called เบี้ย (bîia), which signifies a cowrie shell or a coin of little value. In Turkish the pawn is called piyon, borrowed from the French word Pion in the 19th century.

Outside of the game of chess, "pawn" is often taken to mean "one who is manipulated to serve another's purpose". Because the pawn is the weakest piece, it is often used metaphorically to indicate unimportance or outright disposability, only having utility in the ability to be controlled; for example, "She's only a pawn in their game."

Overview of chess piece names
Language	Pawn	Translation
Adyghe	(Лъ) лъэс / дзэ (lhes / dze)	foot soldier / army
Afrikaans	(P) Pion	
Albanian	(U) Ushtari	soldier
Arabic	ب بيدق / عسكري (baidaq / `askarī)	pawn / soldier
Azerbaijani	P Piyada	foot soldier
Armenian	Զ Զինվոր (Zinvor)	soldier
Basque	(P) Peoia	pawn
Belarusian (Taraškievica)	(Л) латнік	pawn
Bengali	B বোড়ে / সৈন্য (boṛe / śoinno)	Walker / Troop
Bulgarian	(П) пешка	foot soldier
Catalan	(P) peó	
Chinese	(P) 兵 (bīng)	soldier
Czech	(P) pěšec	foot soldier
Danish	(B) bonde	peasant
Dutch	(pi) pion	
English	(P) pawn	
Esperanto	(P) peono	
Estonian	(E) ettur	forwarder
Finnish	(S) sotilas	soldier
French	(P) pion	
Galician	(P) peón	foot soldier
Georgian	პ პაიკი (paiki)	pawn
German	(B) Bauer	peasant / farmer
Greek	(Σ) πιόνι (pióni)	pawn
Hindi	(P) प्यादा (pyādā)	infantryman
Hebrew	רגלי (Ragli)	foot soldier
Hausa	(P) soja	soldier
Hungarian	(Gy) gyalog / paraszt	footman / peasant
Icelandic	(P) peð	pawn
Ido	(P) piono	
Indonesian	(P) pion	
Interslavic	(P) pěšak	infantryman
Irish	(F) fichillín / ceithearnach	little chess piece / kern
Italian	(P) pedone	foot soldier
Japanese	(P) ポーン (pōn) / 歩 歩兵 (fuhyō)	
Javanese	(P) pion	
Kannada	ಪಾ ಪದಾತಿ (padaati)	foot soldier
Kabardian	(Лъ) лъэс / дзэ (lhes / dze)	foot soldier / army
Kazakh	(П) пешка (peşka) / (С) сарбаз (sarbaz)	foot soldier / warrior
Korean	(P) 폰 (pon)	
Latin	(P) pedes / pedo	foot soldier
Latvian	(B) bandinieks	peasant
Lithuanian	(P) pėstininkas	pawn
Luxembourgish	(B) Bauer	farmer
Macedonian	P пешак / пион	infantryman / pawn
Malayalam	(P) കാലാള്‍ / പടയാളി (kaalal / padayaali)	foot soldier
Marathi	(P) प्यादे (pyāde)	foot soldier
Mongolian	(Х) хүү (hüü)	boy
Norwegian Bokmål	(B) bonde	peasant
Norwegian Nynorsk	(B) bonde	peasant
Odia	P ସୈନିକ (sôinikô)	soldier
Oromo
Persian	س/پ سرباز/پیاده	soldier
Polish	(P) pion / pionek	pawn
Portuguese	(P) peão	foot soldier
Romanian	(P) pion	
Russian	(П) пешка (peshka)	
Scottish Gaelic	(P) pàn	pawn
Serbo-Croatian	(P) pješak / pion / pijun ((П) пешак / пион / пијун)	footman / pawn
Northern Sotho	S Seitšhireletšo	
Sicilian	(P) pidinu	foot soldier
Slovak	(P) pešiak	infantryman / pawn
Slovene	(P) kmet	farmer
Spanish	(P) peón	foot soldier
Swedish	(B) bonde	peasant
Tamil	(P) காலாள் / சிப்பாய் (kālāḷ / cippāy)	foot soldier / sepoy
Telugu	బంటు (baṃţu)	soldier
Thai	(บ) เบี้ย (bia)	menial
Turkish	(P) piyon	
Ukrainian	(П) пішак / пішка (pishak / pishka)	foot soldier
Urdu	پیادہ (pyādah)	
Uzbek	(P) piyoda	foot soldier
Vietnamese	tốt / chốt / binh	soldier
Welsh	(G) gwerinwr	peasant

Unicode defines three codepoints for a pawn:

♙ U+2659 White Chess Pawn

♟ U+265F Black Chess Pawn

🨅 U+1FA05 Neutral Chess Pawn

== See also ==
- Backward pawn
- Chess piece
- Chess piece relative value
- Connected pawns
- Doubled pawns
- Isolated pawn
- King and pawn versus king endgame
- Passed pawn
- Pawn structure
