= Chess in Iceland =

Organized chess in Iceland dates back to 1900 with the founding of the Reykjavík Chess Club. The game grew significantly in popularity following the 1972 World Chess Championship, held in the capital Reykjavík, between Bobby Fischer and Boris Spassky. Fischer later became an Icelandic citizen in 2005. Today, Iceland remains active in the international chess community and hosts annual tournaments such as the Reykjavik Open. Chess Grandmaster and Icelandic citizen Friðrik Ólafsson is widely credited with the development of chess in Iceland.

== See also ==
- Culture of Iceland
- Reykjavik Open
- Bobby Fischer Center
