= Bobby Fischer Center =

- Fischersetur
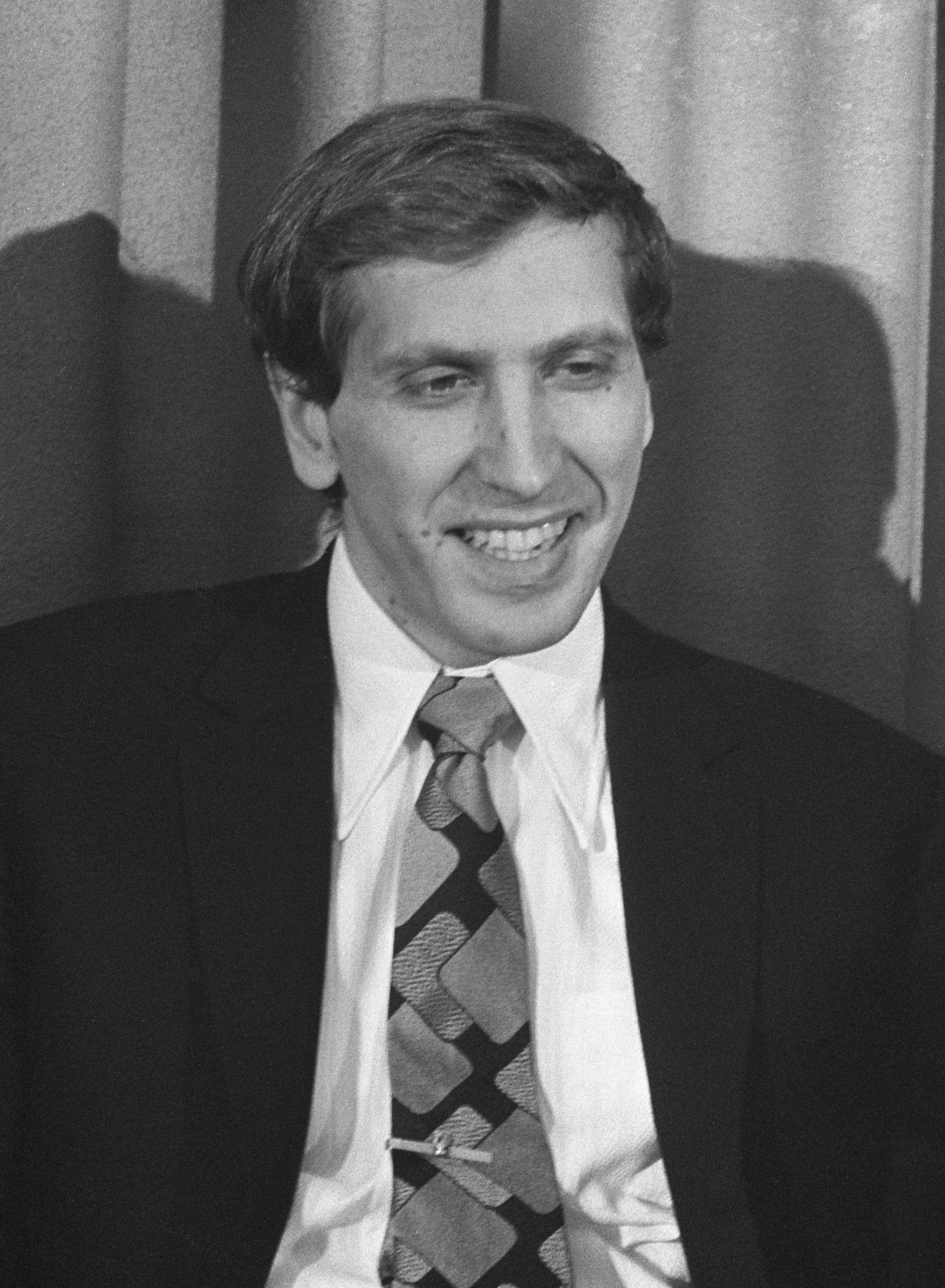
- Bobby Fischer in 1972
- Established: March 9, 2013
- Location: Austurvegur 21, 800 Selfoss, Iceland
- Coordinates: 63.93748°N 20.99649°W
- Type: Biographical Chess Museum
- Collection size: Small
- Director: Gunnar Finnlaugsson
- Website: Bobby Fischer Center

The Bobby Fischer Center (Icelandic: Fischersetur) is a small non-profit biographical museum housing memorabilia of the 1972 World Chess Champion, Bobby Fischer located in Selfoss, Iceland.

== Contents ==
The Bobby Fischer Center has on display photos, the scoresheets, a printout for the radiation measurements demanded by Boris Spassky's delegation after the 17th game and a replica of the chessboard used during the World Chess Championship 1972. The museum includes interesting artifacts related to Fischer's stay in Iceland from 2005 to 2008, including Fischer's chair from the antiquarian bookshop Bókin in Reykjavík.

== Other activities ==
The building facilitates the Chess Club of Selfoss and Vicinity to play and learn about chess. In addition, the building is a venue for chess exhibitions and presentations.

== Fischer's grave ==
Fischer's grave site is at Laugardælir cemetery ( 63°56′47″N 20°58′0″W ), approximately two kilometres or a short walk away from the Bobby Fischer Center.

== See also ==
- Culture of Iceland
- Chess in Iceland
- Icelandic Chess Championship
- Reykjavik Open
