= Aleksandr Nikitin =

Aleksandr Nikitin may refer to:

- Aleksandr Nikitin (environmentalist), Russian submarine officer and nuclear safety inspector turned environmentalist
- Aleksandr Nikitin (chess player), Russian chess player
- Aleksandr Nikitin (footballer), Russian football coach and player
- Aleksandr Nikitin (politician, born 1976), Russian politician
- Aleksandr Nikitin (politician, born 1987), Moldovan-Russian politician
