= 1959 USSR Chess Championship =

26th Soviet Chess Championship (1959)
- Location: Tbilisi

Champion
- Tigran Petrosian

The 1959 Soviet Chess Championship was the 26th edition of USSR Chess Championship which was held from 9 January to 11 February 1959 in Tbilisi. The tournament was won by Tigran Petrosian. The final were preceded by semifinals events at Baku, Moscow, Rostov and Tashkent.

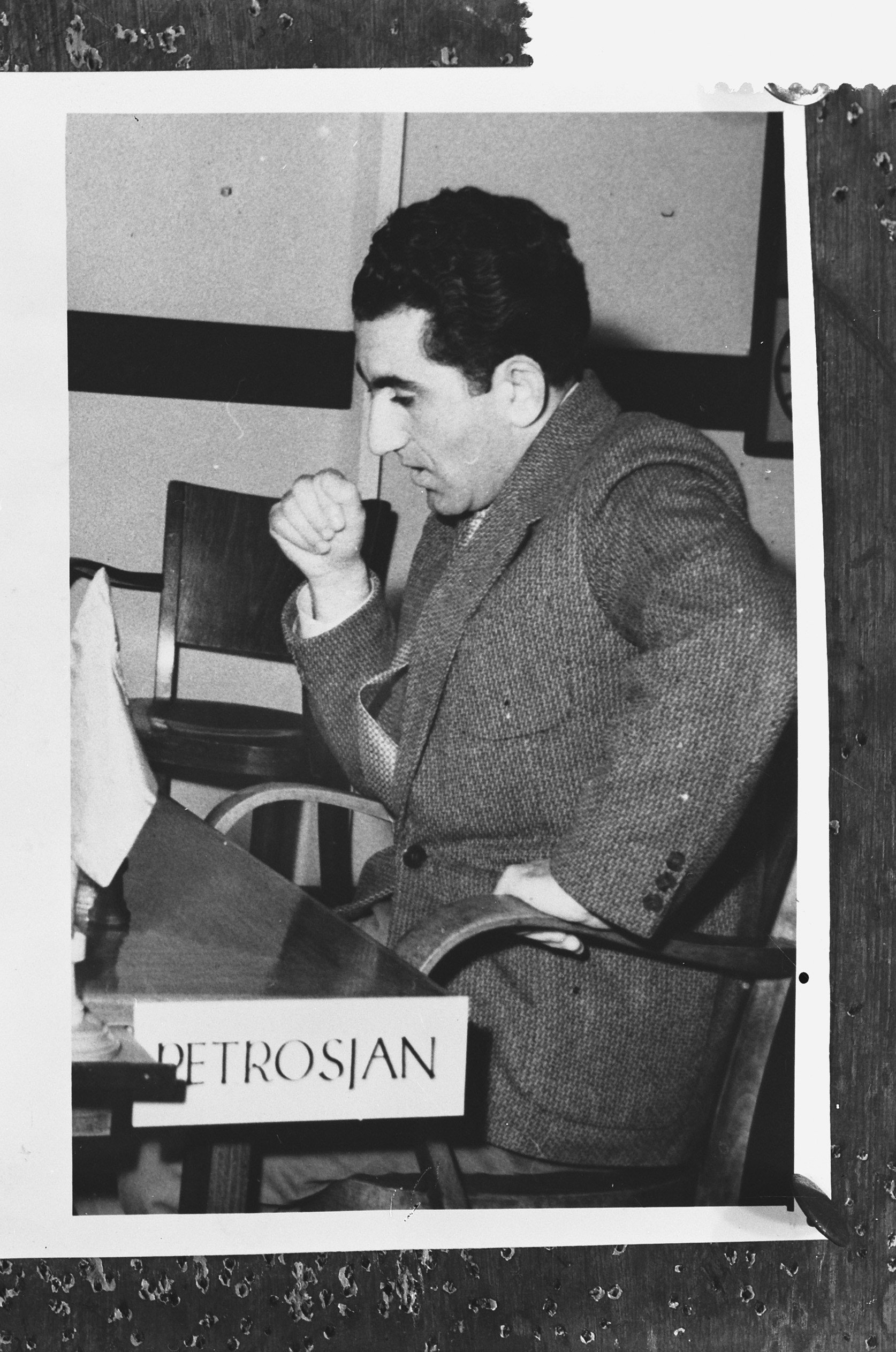
Tigran Petrosian

== Table and results ==
26th Soviet Chess Championship (1959)
	Player	1	2	3	4	5	6	7	8	9	10	11	12	13	14	15	16	17	18	19	20	Total
1	(Soviet Union) Tigran Petrosian	-	½	½	½	½	½	½	1	½	1	½	1	½	1	1	½	1	1	1	½	13½
2	(Soviet Union) Mikhail Tal	½	-	½	½	½	1	½	1	0	½	1	0	1	0	½	1	1	1	1	1	12½
3	(Soviet Union) Boris Spassky	½	½	-	½	0	0	½	½	1	1	1	1	½	½	½	1	½	1	1	1	12½
4	(Soviet Union) Ratmir Kholmov	½	½	½	-	1	½	1	½	½	1	1	0	½	0	1	1	½	1	½	½	12
5	(Soviet Union) Mark Taimanov	½	½	1	0	-	0	½	1	½	½	1	1	½	1	½	1	½	1	½	½	12
6	(Soviet Union) Lev Polugaevsky	½	0	1	½	1	-	0	½	1	½	0	½	0	1	1	1	½	½	½	1	11
7	(Soviet Union) Paul Keres	½	½	½	0	½	1	-	½	1	½	0	½	1	½	½	½	1	0	1	½	10½
8	(Soviet Union) Yuri Averbakh	0	0	½	½	0	½	½	-	1	½	½	½	1	½	½	½	1	1	1	½	10½
9	(Soviet Union) Viktor Korchnoi	½	1	0	½	½	0	0	0	-	1	1	½	1	½	0	1	½	½	1	½	10
10	(Soviet Union) Anatoly Lutikov	0	½	0	0	½	½	½	½	0	-	1	1	½	½	1	0	1	½	1	½	9½
11	(Soviet Union) Efim Geller	½	0	0	0	0	1	1	½	0	0	-	½	½	1	1	½	½	½	1	1	9½
12	(Soviet Union) Eduard Gufeld	0	1	0	1	0	½	½	½	½	0	½	-	½	½	½	½	1	½	½	½	9
13	(Soviet Union) David Bronstein	½	0	½	½	½	1	0	0	0	½	½	½	-	1	½	½	½	1	0	1	9
14	(Soviet Union) Yacov Yuchtman	0	1	½	1	0	0	½	½	½	½	0	½	0	-	½	0	1	½	½	1	8½
15	(Soviet Union) Semyon Furman	0	½	½	0	½	0	½	½	1	0	0	½	½	½	-	½	0	½	1	1	8
16	(Soviet Union) Bukhuti Gurgenidze	½	0	0	0	0	0	½	½	0	1	½	½	½	1	½	-	½	½	0	½	7
17	(Soviet Union) Evgeni Vasiukov	0	0	½	½	½	½	0	0	½	0	½	0	½	0	1	½	-	½	1	½	7
18	(Soviet Union) Nikolai Krogius	0	0	0	0	0	½	1	0	½	½	½	½	0	½	½	½	½	-	½	½	6½
19	(Soviet Union) Rashid Nezhmetdinov	0	0	0	½	½	½	0	0	0	0	0	½	1	½	0	1	0	½	-	1	6
20	(Soviet Union) Alexander Nikitin	½	0	0	½	½	0	½	½	½	½	0	½	0	0	0	½	½	½	0	-	5½
