= Laugardælir =

Small settlement in southwest Iceland

Coordinates: 63°57′0″N 20°58′0″W

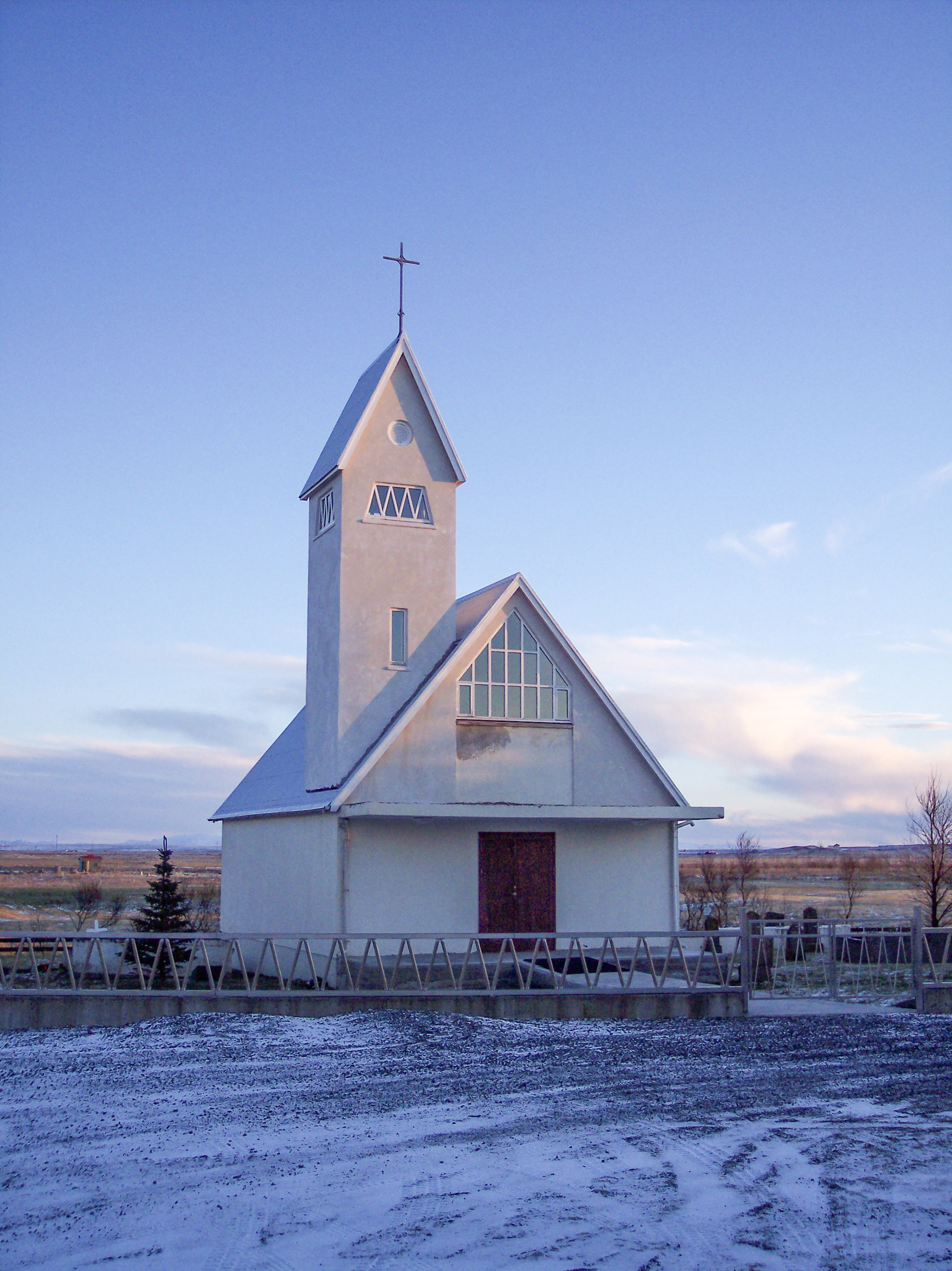
Church of Laugardælir, Fischer's resting place

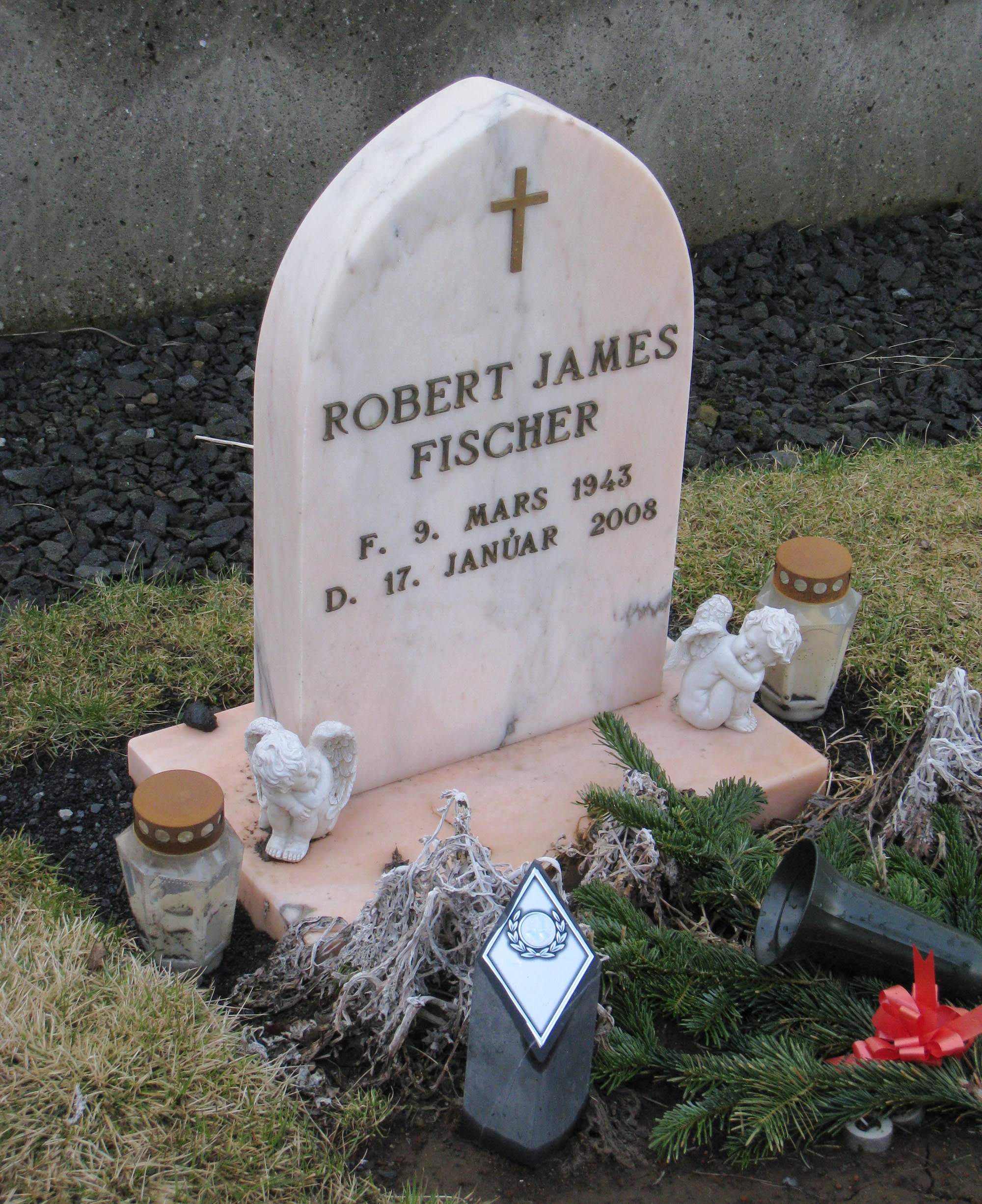
Fischer's grave

Laugardælir (Icelandic pronunciation: [ˈlœyːɣarˌtaiːlɪr̥]) is a small settlement in southwest Iceland, near the town of Selfoss. The town gained international attention when former 1972 World Chess Champion Bobby Fischer was buried in the cemetery of Laugardælir Church in 2008.

== See also ==
- Bobby Fischer Center, within 300 metres of cemetery.
- List of cities in Iceland
