= Aleksandr Nikitin (chess player) =

Russian chess player, coach, and theorist (1935–2022)

Personal information
- Born: Aleksandr Sergeyevich Nikitin; 27 January 1935 Moscow, Russian SFSR, USSR
- Died: 5 June 2022 (aged 87) Moscow, Russia

Chess career
- Country: Soviet Union (until 1991); Russia (since 1991)
- Title: Master of Sports of the USSR (1952); International Master (1993)
- Peak rating: 2445 (January 1994)

Aleksandr Sergeyevich Nikitin (Russian: Александр Сергеевич Никитин; 27 January 1935 – 5 June 2022) was a Russian chess player, chess coach, theorist; and Master of Sports of the USSR (1952). He was a coach of the Azerbaijan SSR (1980) and the USSR (1986) teams, and was a coach for Garry Kasparov from 1976 to 1990.

== Life and career ==
Aleksandr Nikitin was born in Moscow. He attended and graduated from the Moscow Power Engineering Institute. Afterwards, Nikitin worked on a production at the MPEI Special Design Bureau. At the age of 17, he became a chess master. He competed in a number of championships in Moscow (the best result in 1954 - 2nd-5th place), in an international tournament in Kislovodsk (1966 - 9th place) and in the 1959 USSR Chess Championship. As a member of the USSR team Nikitin won the World University Championships in 1955, 1957 and 1958.

Nikitin retired from chess for a while, concentrating on scientific research; however, he came back and became one of the most distinguished chess coaches in history. He made his debut as a coach in 1963, when he and Igor Bondarevsky prepared the USSR student team for the Olympic Games. From 1973 to 1976, he worked for the USSR Sports Committee as the national team coach and was a member of Anatoly Karpov's team, which helped him prepare for his lost World Championship match. There was a conflict between Nikitin and Karpov in 1976 and, as a result, Nikitin was fired from the Sports Committee.

In 1973, Nikitin got acquainted with Garry Kasparov at the junior tournament. Within the next three years, he consulted Kasparov periodically and from 1976, he was his permanent coach. Ten years later, Kasparov won his fifth and final world championship match against his great rival Anatoly Karpov, but in 1990, Nikitin and Kasparov parted ways.

In 1992, Nikitin helped Boris Spassky during his exhibition match with Bobby Fischer. In the late 1990s, he served as the permanent coach of Étienne Bacrot, who became the youngest grandmaster in the world and the multiple champion of France. Niktin also coached Russian grandmaster Dmitry Yakovenko, the individual European champion in 2012, who was fifth in the FIDE world ranking.

In 1993, Nikitin was honored with the FIDE title of International Master.

== Death ==
Nikitin died in Moscow on 5 June 2022, at the age of 87.

== Writings ==
- Nikitin, Aleksandr (1972). Mikhail Chigorin (with Evgeni Vasiukov and Alexander Narkevich)
- Nikitin, Aleksandr (1994). Sicilian Defense. Scheveningen (with Garry Kasparov)
- Nikitin, Aleksandr (1998). With Kasparov: Move by Move, Year by Year.
- Nikitin, Aleksandr (2020). My Friend Evgeny Vasyukov
