= Modern Benoni =

Chess opening

Position: a8 black rook, b8 black knight, c8 black bishop, d8 black queen, e8 black king, f8 black bishop, h8 black rook, a7 black pawn, b7 black pawn, d7 black pawn, f7 black pawn, g7 black pawn, h7 black pawn, e6 black pawn, f6 black knight, c5 black pawn, d5 white pawn, c4 white pawn, a2 white pawn, b2 white pawn, e2 white pawn, f2 white pawn, g2 white pawn, h2 white pawn, a1 white rook, b1 white knight, c1 white bishop, d1 white queen, e1 white king, f1 white bishop, g1 white knight, h1 white rook
- Moves: 1.d4 Nf6 2.c4 c5 3.d5 e6
- ECO: A60–A79
- Origin: Capablanca–Marshall, New York 1927 (by transposition)
- Named after: Benoni Defence
- Parent: Indian Defence
- Synonym: Modern Benoni Defence

The Modern Benoni is a chess opening that begins with the moves:

1. d4 Nf6
2. c4 c5
3. d5 e6

After the initial moves, Black proceeds to capture on d5, creating a majority of black pawns on the queenside. To support their advance, the king's bishop is usually fianchettoed on g7. These two features differentiate Black's setup from the other Benoni defences and the King's Indian Defence, although transpositions between these openings are common.

Frank Marshall introduced the Modern Benoni in 1927, but his experiments with the opening went largely ignored for over 20 years. In the 1950s the system was revitalized by players in the Soviet Union, chief among them Mikhail Tal. Its subsequent adoption by players of a similarly aggressive and uncompromising style such as Bobby Fischer and Garry Kasparov established the opening's reputation as one of Black's most dynamic, albeit risky, responses to 1.d4.

The Modern Benoni suffered a serious theoretical crisis in the 1980s and 1990s, when players as Black encountered great difficulties in meeting the Taimanov Attack and the Modern Main Line. Only in the 21st century has the opening's reputation and theoretical standing made a recovery. Vladimir Kramnik chose it when he needed a win with Black in the penultimate game of the 2004 World Championship, though that particular game resulted in a draw.

== Initial moves ==
Position: a7 black pawn, b7 black pawn, f7 black pawn, h7 black pawn, d6 black pawn, g6 black pawn, c5 black pawn, d5 white pawn, e4 white pawn, a2 white pawn, b2 white pawn, f2 white pawn, g2 white pawn, h2 white pawn

The basic pawn structure of the Modern Benoni: White has a central pawn majority, Black a queenside pawn majority.

The standard move order for Black to enter the Modern Benoni is 1.d4 Nf6 2.c4 c5. Here it is possible for White to avoid 3.d5: respectable alternatives include 3.Nf3, typically transposing to a line of the English Opening, as well as 3.e3. Taking the pawn with 3.dxc5 is hardly ever seen, because Black easily recovers it after 3...e6 followed by ...Bxc5.

Still, 3.d5 has long been considered White's most challenging move, as it gains space in the centre. While it is possible for Black to avoid ...e7–e6 for the time being and play other moves such as 3...d6 or 3...g6, delaying this move until after White plays e2–e4 gives White the extra option of recapturing on d5 with the e-pawn. While recapturing in this fashion does not give White a central pawn majority, it maintains White's spatial advantage and denies Black the counterplay associated with possession of a queenside pawn majority. Thus players who are seeking the typical imbalance in pawn structure associated with the Modern Benoni tend to prefer the immediate 3...e6 followed by 4...exd5.

== Alternative move orders and transpositions ==
It is possible, indeed common, for Black's second and third moves to be reversed: thus 1.d4 Nf6 2.c4 e6 3.Nc3 c5 and 1.d4 Nf6 2.c4 e6 3.Nf3 c5 will both transpose into the Modern Benoni if White allows it with 4.d5. The latter move order has been especially popular since the 1980s, as it allows Black to reach the Modern Benoni while sidestepping the Taimanov Attack. It also gives Black the additional option of meeting 4.d5 with 4...b5, the Blumenfeld Gambit. Players who use this move order will often choose a different defence against 3.Nc3, such as the Nimzo-Indian with 3...Bb4.

Another frequent transposition into the Modern Benoni occurs when White invites a Catalan Opening with 1.d4 Nf6 2.c4 e6 3.g3 and Black responds with 3...c5. If White responds with 4.d5 exd5 5.cxd5, Black can play 5...d6, which often transposes into the Fianchetto Variation; but a common alternative is 5...b5, which leads to independent positions.

Black can also try to reach the Modern Benoni through a Benoni Defence move order, i.e., 1.d4 c5 2.d5 Nf6, when 3.c4 e6 would complete the transposition. In this move order, White is not obliged to put the c-pawn on c4 and often avoids it, since c4 is a useful square for a white knight. Several lines of the King's Indian Defence, such as the Four Pawns Attack, the Sämisch Variation and the Fianchetto Variation, can also transpose into variations of the Modern Benoni if Black plays ...c5 followed by ...e6 and ...exd5 and White recaptures with the c-pawn.

== History ==
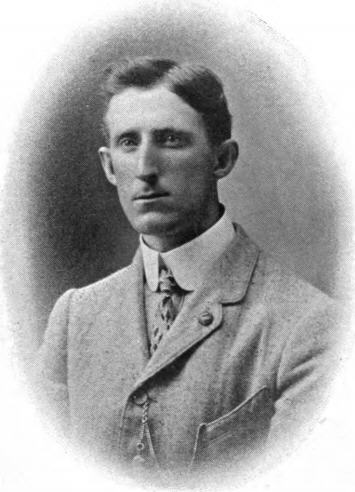
Frank James Marshall, the first player to play the Modern Benoni

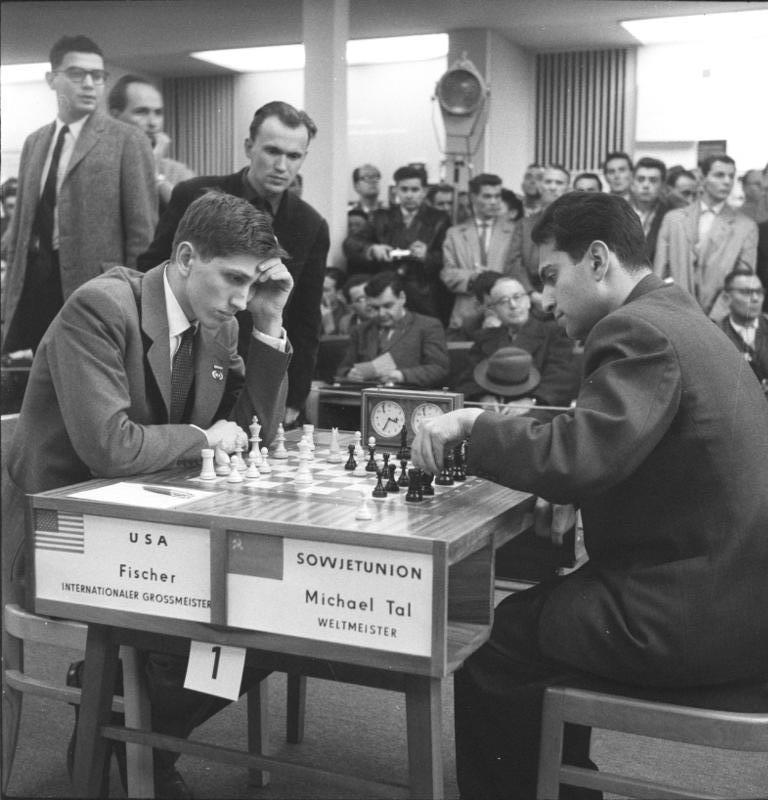
Bobby Fischer and Mikhail Tal, two pioneers of the Modern Benoni

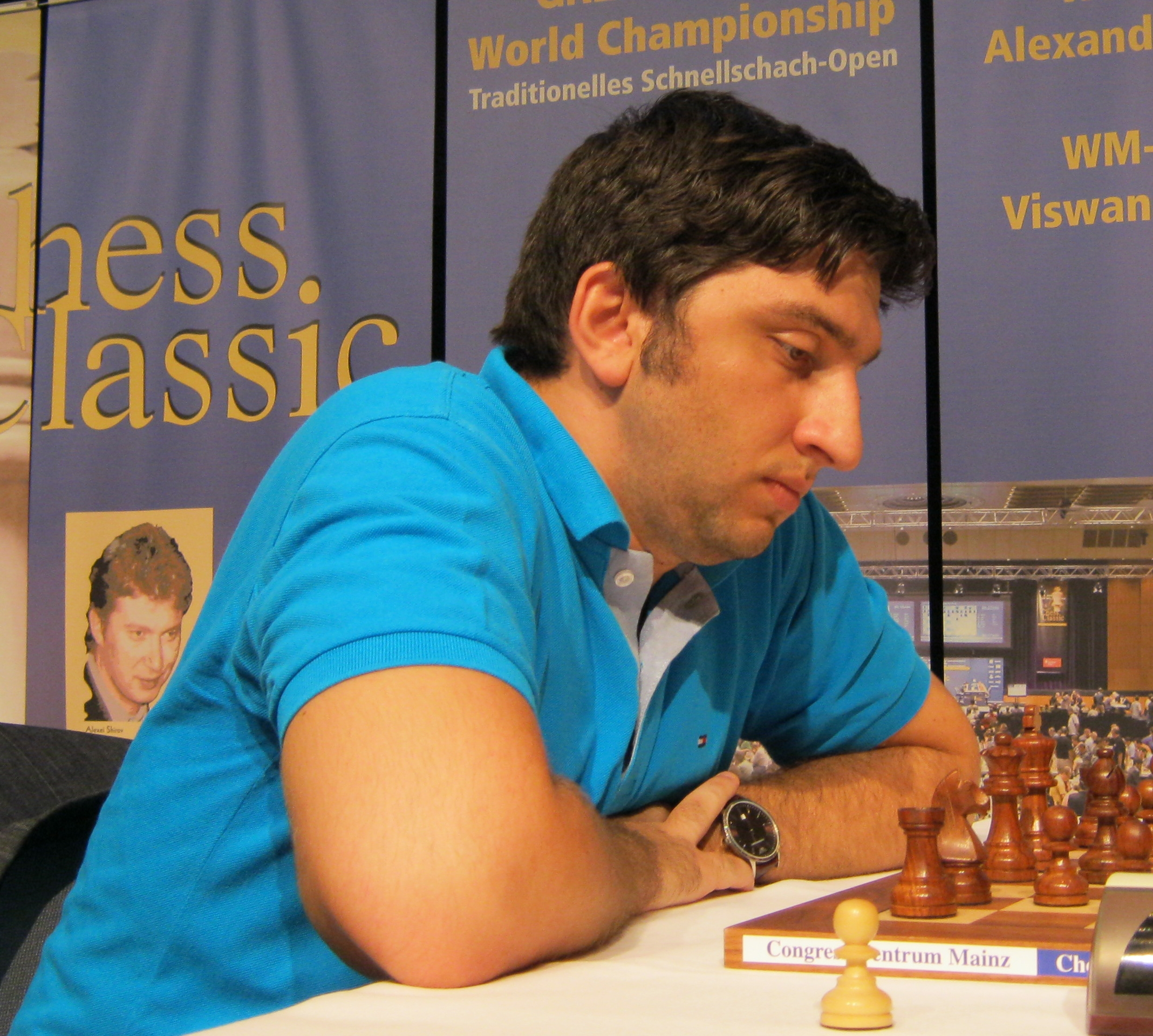
Vugar Gashimov, a leading practitioner of the Modern Benoni

Frank Marshall introduced the Modern Benoni at the New York 1927 chess tournament. He played it twice, gaining a draw against José Raúl Capablanca in the Fianchetto Variation, but losing soundly to Aron Nimzowitsch, who played the Knight's Tour. Nimzowitsch received the third special prize of the tournament for this game and labelled Marshall's opening an "unfortunate" "extravagance" in his annotations; as a result, it lay virtually abandoned for decades. However, Karel Hromádka's experiments with the Benoni Defence in the 1930s occasionally featured the moves ...e7–e6 and ...exd5, resulting in a transposition to the Modern Benoni.

Interest in the Modern Benoni was revived in the 1950s, when the King's Indian Defence gained in popularity among Soviet players and their investigations branched into related opening systems. The imbalance inherent in the Modern Benoni's pawn structure and the counter-chances this implied for Black appealed to aggressive players such as Rashid Nezhmetdinov and Alexander Tolush; the Israeli master Moshe Czerniak also employed it frequently. Lev Polugaevsky, Boris Spassky and Alexey Suetin were among the younger generation of Soviet players who used it regularly in the 1950s and 1960s.

But the player primarily responsible for elevating the Modern Benoni to the status of a major opening was Mikhail Tal, who took up the opening in 1953 after seeing one of Nezhmetdinov's games. The tactical positions it led to were a perfect fit for Tal's combinatorial gifts and he crushed many opponents in brilliant style. Famous examples include his game against Bukhuti Gurgenidze at the 1957 USSR championship, excerpted below, and his win against Yuri Averbakh at the same tournament the following year. He also became the first player to use the Modern Benoni in a world championship match, playing it twice against Mikhail Botvinnik in 1960. Former World Champion and opening authority Max Euwe acknowledged Tal's contribution to the opening by naming it the "Tal-System" in his 1965 opening encyclopedia.

These developments did not go unnoticed outside the Soviet Union: the name "Modern Benoni" had appeared in print by 1955. In the 1960s Larry Evans began employing the system frequently, and from 1966 onwards, Bobby Fischer also included it in his repertoire, albeit as a secondary weapon. Even so, Fischer was responsible for one of the most famous games ever played with the opening: down 2–0 in the 1972 World Championship match, he answered Spassky's 1.d4 with the Modern Benoni in Game 3 and scored a momentum-changing victory.

The successes of Tal and Fischer inspired a new generation of players to take up the Modern Benoni in the 1970s and 1980s, including Walter Browne, Ljubomir Ljubojević, John Nunn, Dragoljub Velimirović, Lev Psakhis, Mihai Șubă and Nick de Firmian. The young Garry Kasparov also had the defence in his arsenal—his win against Viktor Korchnoi at the 1982 Lucerne Olympiad was considered the highlight of the tournament and remains one of the most famous games ever played in the opening. It became a favoured weapon for players needing to win against 1.d4: for example, Psakhis used it to defeat Yuri Razuvaev in the penultimate round of the 1980 USSR Championship, catching Alexander Beliavsky in the lead and ultimately sharing first place with him.

But in the early 1980s, White scored several crushing victories at high-profile tournaments using the aggressive Taimanov Attack, which caused players to question the fundamental soundness of Black's opening. By the end of the decade, the Modern Main Line had also emerged as a dangerous weapon for White, which only compounded Black's troubles. As a result, the opening declined in popularity and a number of grandmasters gave it up altogether. Those who continued to play it often chose to do so via the move order 1.d4 Nf6 2.c4 e6 3.Nf3 c5 4.d5, when White's early development of the knight to f3 rules out the Taimanov Attack and gives Black opportunities to avoid the Modern Main Line.

Mired in this theoretical crisis, the Modern Benoni remained unpopular in the 1990s. Veselin Topalov was the only top-level player to play it regularly, and he too generally preferred the 2...e6 3.Nf3 c5 move order. At the beginning of the new millennium, the theoretician John Watson published a well-regarded survey of the opening that may have contributed to the opening's revival. Many of the ideas he recommended, such as 9...Qh4+ versus the Taimanov Attack and 9...Nh5 in the Modern Main Line, grew in popularity after its publication. The opening regained some more of its former respectability when Vladimir Kramnik, needing a win with Black against Peter Leko, played it in the second to last game of the 2004 World Championship. While he did achieve a winning position at one point, the game ended in a draw. Nevertheless, Étienne Bacrot, Boris Gelfand and Vassily Ivanchuk have all since used the Modern Benoni at the highest levels of competition, while Vugar Gashimov became the opening's most notable proponent. He was the strongest player willing to use the original 1.d4 Nf6 2.c4 c5 3.d5 e6 move order and defend Black's cause in both the Taimanov Attack and the Modern Main Line.

== Strategy ==
The Modern Benoni is one of Black's sharpest and most active defences against 1.d4. The exchange of White's c-pawn for Black's e-pawn leaves White with a pawn majority in the centre and Black with one on the queenside. This asymmetry suggests that White will try to play on the kingside and in the centre, while Black will seek counterplay on the queenside. However, this simplistic generalization does not hold in many cases—depending on how the pieces are arranged, either side may be able to fight back on the flank where they are theoretically weaker.

The creation of such a pronounced structural imbalance so early on in the game implies that Black aims to counterattack rather than equalize. Thus the opening has acquired a reputation for being risky: as Psakhis once wrote, the Modern Benoni "is definitely not an opening for cowards." Since White's central superiority typically constitutes a positional advantage, Black must frequently resort to tactical play and material sacrifices in order not to be forced into passivity.

=== Black's queenside play ===
Donner–Tal, Zurich 1959

Position: c8 black rook, e8 black rook, g8 black king, b7 black pawn, d7 black knight, f7 black pawn, g7 black bishop, h7 black pawn, a6 black pawn, b6 black queen, d6 black pawn, g6 black pawn, c5 black pawn, d5 white pawn, a4 white pawn, c4 white queen, e4 white pawn, f4 white pawn, c3 white knight, h3 white pawn, b2 white pawn, g2 white pawn, h2 white bishop, b1 white rook, e1 white rook, g1 white king

Position after 20.Rab1

The game Donner–Tal, Zurich 1959, was a classic demonstration of the power of Black's queenside pawn advance, backed up by the bishop on g7. After Black's 20...Qb4! White was unable to exchange queens, as 21.Qxb4 cxb4 22.Nd1 Nc5 would fork the pawns on a4 and e4. However, the actual game did not last long after Donner's 21.Qf1: Tal set his pawns in motion with 21...c4 22.Re2 b5 23.axb5 axb5 24.Kh1, created a passed c-pawn with 24...Bxc3! 25.bxc3 Qxc3 26.Rxb5 Qd3 27.Qe1 c3 28.Rb1, and forced Donner's resignation with 28...Nc5! when White could neither save his e-pawn nor stop Black's c-pawn from queening. According to Donner, while he spent over two hours on the game, Tal used only fifteen minutes.

=== White's kingside play ===
Penrose–Tal, Leipzig ol 1960

Position: b8 black rook, c8 black bishop, e8 black rook, g8 black king, c7 black queen, d7 black knight, f7 black pawn, g7 black bishop, h7 black pawn, d6 black pawn, g6 black pawn, b5 black pawn, c5 black knight, d5 white pawn, c4 black pawn, e4 white pawn, f4 white pawn, c3 white knight, e3 white bishop, g3 white knight, h3 white pawn, b2 white pawn, c2 white bishop, f2 white queen, g2 white pawn, a1 white rook, f1 white rook, g1 white king

Position after 18...axb5

The central pawn majority is White's main positional trump in the Modern Benoni. By staking out an advantage in space on the kingside, it allows White to develop an initiative on that side of the board. The most important tool in White's arsenal is the e4–e5 pawn advance, which can open up lines and squares for the white pieces, and result in the creation of a passed d-pawn if Black answers with ...dxe5.

A famous example of the e4–e5 break leading to a kingside attack occurred in the game Penrose–Tal from the 1960 Leipzig Olympiad. With 19.e5! dxe5 20.f5! Bb7 21.Rad1 Ba8 22.Nce4 White installed a powerful knight on e4, while Black's pieces were hemmed in by the pawn on e5. Penrose soon crashed through on the f-file and scored a stunning upset over the reigning world champion. Other classic examples of this central breakthrough include Ojanen–Keres, Estonia–Finland match, Helsinki 1960 and Korchnoi–Tal, USSR championship, Yerevan 1962.

=== Black's kingside play ===
Gurgenidze–Tal, Moscow 1957

Position: a8 black rook, c8 black bishop, d8 black queen, e8 black rook, g8 black king, a7 black pawn, c7 black knight, f7 black pawn, g7 black bishop, h7 black pawn, b6 black pawn, d6 black pawn, g6 black pawn, c5 black pawn, d5 white pawn, a4 white pawn, e4 white pawn, g4 black knight, c3 white knight, h3 white pawn, b2 white pawn, c2 white queen, d2 white knight, e2 white bishop, f2 white pawn, g2 white pawn, a1 white rook, c1 white bishop, e1 white rook, g1 white king

Position after 14.h3

The half-open e-file gives Black a certain degree of influence over the kingside. A rook on e8 puts pressure on White's e-pawn and restrains it from advancing. Tactics involving ...Nxe4 are not uncommon — the games Averbakh–Tal, USSR championship, Riga 1958, and Uhlmann–Fischer, Interzonal, Palma de Mallorca 1970, are well-known examples. Black can initiate further kingside activity by playing ...Nd7–e5 followed by ...g7–g5. The pawn move prevents White from driving away the knight with f2–f4, and sets up the possibility of Black bringing a knight on f4 via g6 or h5. Further space-gaining pawn advances such as ...g5–g4 and ...f7–f5 may even be possible.

En route to winning his first USSR championship, Tal provided a brilliant example of how Black's dark-square control could lead to a kingside attack. Against Gurgenidze at the 1957 championship in Moscow, he unleashed the double sacrifice 14...Nxf2!! 15.Kxf2 Qh4+ 16.Kf1 (16.g3? Bd4+ 17.Kg2 Qxh3+ 18.Kf3 Bg4+ 19.Kf4 g5+ 20.Kxg5 Be3+ 21.Kf6 Qh6 mate) Bd4 17.Nd1 Qxh3! with the point that 18.gxh3 Bxh3 is mate. After 18.Bf3 Qh2 19.Ne3 f5! 20.Ndc4 fxe4 21.Bxe4 Ba6! White was unable to defend against Black's threats of 22...Rxe4 23.Qxe4 Re8 24.Qc2 Nxd5 and 22...Bxc4+ 23.Nxc4 Rf8+ 24. Bf3 Rxf3+, and Gurgenidze resigned after move 27.

=== White's queenside play ===
Pintér–Brynell, Elista ol 1998

Position: e8 black rook, b7 black rook, c7 black knight, d7 black queen, f7 black pawn, g7 black bishop, h7 black king, a6 black pawn, d6 black pawn, f6 black knight, g6 black pawn, h6 black pawn, b5 black pawn, c5 black pawn, d5 white pawn, a4 white pawn, e4 white pawn, c3 white knight, e3 white bishop, f3 white pawn, b2 white pawn, d2 white queen, g2 white pawn, h2 white pawn, b1 white rook, e1 white rook, f1 white bishop, h1 white king

Position after 21...b5

When Black prepares the ...b7–b5 pawn break with ...a6, White usually tries to hinder it by playing a2–a4, even though this advance weakens the b4-square. As a further deterrent to Black's queenside expansion, White often moves the knight on f3 to c4 via d2. With the knight on c4, Black's ...b7–b5 break may be met by axb5 followed by Na5, when the arrival of a white knight on c6 could severely disrupt Black's position. The knight on c4 also attacks Black's backward pawn on d6, and White can often increase the pressure on this pawn by playing Bf4 or Nb5. The strength of White's knight on c4 often induces Black to exchange it off: typical ways of doing so are ...Nb6, ...Ne5, or ...b7–b6 followed by ...Ba6.

Even if Black should succeed in enforcing the ...b7–b5 break, White may halt the b-pawn's further advance by simply playing b2–b4. Even though this would give Black the opportunity to establish a passed c-pawn with ...c5–c4, blockading the queenside in this manner may allow White to pursue play in the centre and on the kingside undisturbed. The ...c5–c4 advance would also relinquish Black's control over the d4-square, which may be occupied to good effect by a white knight or bishop.

A successful demonstration of this last idea occurred in the game Pintér–Brynell at the 1998 Elista Olympiad. White answered Black's 21...b5 with 22.b4!, and Black was unable to keep the queenside open with 22...bxa4? because 23.bxc5 Rxb1 24.Rxb1 dxc5 25.Bxc5 would have left White's central pawns unstoppable. After the game's 22...c4 23.a5! Qe7 24.Bd4 Black's queenside play had ground to a halt; Pintér later won with a pawn advance on the kingside.

== Variations ==
After the initial moves 1.d4 Nf6 2.c4 c5 3.d5 e6, the moves 4.Nf3 and 4.g3 reach positions discussed previously, while 4.dxe6 fxe6 is also ineffective, since Black gains a half-open f-file and the chance to take over the centre with ...d7–d5. Instead White's most popular move is 4.Nc3, preparing to support the d-pawn with 5.e4. As mentioned above, were Black to delay the capture on d5, White would then gain the option of recapturing with the e-pawn. Thus Black generally plays 4...exd5 immediately.

Following the recapture 5.cxd5, Black has an eccentric option in 5...Bd6, the Snake Benoni. But most players prefer 5...d6, which stops White's d-pawn from advancing to d6. Black's control over the central dark squares d4 and e5 will then be augmented by fianchettoing the bishop on g7. Meanwhile, White must decide whether or not to play 6.e4. Although this move gains space in the centre, it also gives Black a target of attack on the half-open e-file. White can deny Black this target for the time being by playing 6.Nf3 first.

=== 4.Nc3 exd5 5.cxd5 d6 6.e4 g6 ===
Position: a8 black rook, b8 black knight, c8 black bishop, d8 black queen, e8 black king, f8 black bishop, h8 black rook, a7 black pawn, b7 black pawn, f7 black pawn, h7 black pawn, d6 black pawn, f6 black knight, g6 black pawn, c5 black pawn, d5 white pawn, e4 white pawn, c3 white knight, a2 white pawn, b2 white pawn, f2 white pawn, g2 white pawn, h2 white pawn, a1 white rook, c1 white bishop, d1 white queen, e1 white king, f1 white bishop, g1 white knight, h1 white rook

Position after 1.d4 Nf6 2.c4 c5 3.d5 e6 4.Nc3 exd5 5.cxd5 d6 6.e4 g6

The most critical lines in the Modern Benoni occur after 6.e4 g6. At this point 7.Nf3 has historically been White's most popular move, intending to complete kingside development and castle. Here theory divides into three major branches:

- 7...Bg7 8.Be2 0-0 9.0-0, the Classical Main Line;
- 7...Bg7 8.h3 0-0 9.Bd3, the Modern Main Line;
- and 7...a6, an attempt by Black to avoid the Modern Main Line.

Apart from 7.Nf3, White also has several important alternatives, including:

- 7.f4, which leads to the Taimanov Attack, Four Pawns Attack, or Mikenas Attack;
- 7.Bd3, which often leads to the Knaak Variation but may also transpose to the Modern Main Line;
- 7.h3, which is yet another way for White to reach the Modern Main Line after 7...Bg7 8.Nf3 0-0 9.Bd3;
- 7.f3, the Kapengut Variation;
- and 7.Nge2, which was recommended for White in 2012 by Lars Schandorff. The idea is to develop with Ng3, Be2 and 0-0.

==== Classical Main Line: 7.Nf3 Bg7 8.Be2 0-0 9.0-0 ====
Position: a8 black rook, b8 black knight, c8 black bishop, d8 black queen, f8 black rook, g8 black king, a7 black pawn, b7 black pawn, f7 black pawn, g7 black bishop, h7 black pawn, d6 black pawn, f6 black knight, g6 black pawn, c5 black pawn, d5 white pawn, e4 white pawn, c3 white knight, f3 white knight, a2 white pawn, b2 white pawn, e2 white bishop, f2 white pawn, g2 white pawn, h2 white pawn, a1 white rook, c1 white bishop, d1 white queen, f1 white rook, g1 white king

Classical Main Line: 7.Nf3 Bg7 8.Be2 0-0 9.0-0

Before the advent of the Taimanov Attack and the Modern Main Line, the sequence 7.Nf3 Bg7 8.Be2 0-0 9.0-0 was the most frequently contested line in the Modern Benoni. Here Black has a choice between three main plans. Two of them begin with 9...Re8, attacking the e-pawn. After 10.Nd2, Black's most dynamic plan is to prepare kingside play with 10...Nbd7 followed by ...Ne5 and ...g6–g5. This plan became popular in the 1970s after Fischer used it, and although it is riskier than the alternatives, it remains Black's best option to complicate the game.

Alternatively, Black can try the older move 10...Na6, intending to bring the knight to c7 to prepare the ...b7–b5 break. White most commonly responds with Gligorić's 11.f3 Nc7 12.a4, which clamps down on b5 and overprotects e4 so that White can follow up with Nc4. Black's position remains solid but offers fewer active possibilities than after 10...Nbd7.

At the 1973 Madrid international tournament Ljubojević demonstrated what is now considered to be Black's most reliable path to equality. Against Silvino García Martínez he played 9...a6 10.a4 Bg4 11.Bf4 Bxf3 12.Bxf3 and now the innovation 12...Qe7! which prepares ...Nbd7 while keeping the pawn on d6 defended. The exchange of Black's bishop for White's knight eases Black's slightly cramped position and weakens the force of White's e4–e5 break.

==== Modern Main Line: 7.Nf3 Bg7 8.h3 0-0 9.Bd3 ====
Position: a8 black rook, b8 black knight, c8 black bishop, d8 black queen, f8 black rook, g8 black king, a7 black pawn, b7 black pawn, f7 black pawn, g7 black bishop, h7 black pawn, d6 black pawn, f6 black knight, g6 black pawn, c5 black pawn, d5 white pawn, e4 white pawn, c3 white knight, d3 white bishop, f3 white knight, h3 white pawn, a2 white pawn, b2 white pawn, f2 white pawn, g2 white pawn, a1 white rook, c1 white bishop, d1 white queen, e1 white king, h1 white rook

Modern Main Line: 7.Nf3 Bg7 8.h3 0-0 9.Bd3

By the late 1980s Ljubojević's plan of exchanging the light-squared bishop had been proven so reliable it was deterring White from entering the Classical Main Line altogether. The desire to prevent ...Bg4 led to the development of the Modern Main Line, 7.Nf3 Bg7 8.h3 0-0 9.Bd3. If Black continues in the same manner as in the Classical Main Line, e.g. 9...a6 10.a4 Nbd7 11.0-0 Re8, then White appears to maintain an advantage with 12.Bf4.

Originally it was thought that the temporary pawn sacrifice 9...b5 was an easy equalizer: after 10.Nxb5 Nxe4?! 11.Bxe4 Re8 Black seemingly regains the sacrificed piece without trouble. But in Alburt–de Firmian, USA ch 1990, White uncorked 12.Ng5! and went on to win: this move was judged the most important theoretical novelty in Volume 50 of Chess Informant. Later it was found that the immediate 10...Re8 is a better way of recovering the pawn, with a complicated game in the offing.

The other capture 10.Bxb5 has been subjected to extensive analysis and testing, which has led to the conclusion that the sequence 10...Nxe4 11.Nxe4 Qa5+ 12.Nfd2 Qxb5 13.Nxd6 Qa6 14.N2c4 Nd7 15.0-0 is more or less forced. In the resulting positions Black has found it difficult to generate any winning chances, and even finding equality has not been a simple task. The fact that one must know a lot of theory just to secure a draw has rendered the entire variation beginning with 9...b5 rather unattractive from Black's point of view, even though it appears to be objectively the best move.

Thus Black has sought other methods of combating the Modern Main Line. The sharp variation 9...Re8 10.0-0 c4 received significant attention in the mid-1990s, but after 11.Bxc4 Nxe4 12.Nxe4 Rxe4 13.Bg5 Black has yet to demonstrate clear equality. In 2001 John Watson published a detailed analysis of 9...Nh5, which stops White from playing Bc1–f4 and allows Black to follow up with ...Nd7–e5. While it is also unclear whether this move ultimately equalizes, at least Black retains significant counterplay.

==== Black avoids the Modern Main Line: 7.Nf3 a6 ====
White's success with the Modern Main Line has spurred Black to search for ways to get in ...Bg4 before White stops it with h2–h3. After 7.Nf3, the immediate 7...Bg4? runs into 8.Qa4+!, when 8...Bd7 9.Qb3 or 8...Nbd7? 9.Nd2! threatening 10.f3 both give White the advantage. So Black first plays 7...a6 threatening 8...b5. Only after 8.a4 does Black play 8...Bg4, when a transposition to the Classical Main Line is likely: 9.Be2 Bxf3 10.Bxf3 Bg7 11.0-0 0-0 12.Bf4 Qe7 is Ljubojević's line, for example. Instead White may try to exploit Black's early ...Bg4 with 9.Qb3, but after 9...Bxf3 10.Qxb7 Black can either maintain material and positional equality with 10...Bxg2 or try for more with 10...Nbd7!?. To cut across Black's idea of ...Bg4, White has even resorted to 8.h3 allowing 8...b5, but after 9.Bd3 Bg7 10.0-0 0-0 Black obtains an acceptable position.

If White has entered the Benoni through the standard move order (4.Nc3 exd5 5.cxd5 d6 6.e4 g6), White can dodge such sidelines by avoiding the immediate 7.Nf3 and starting with 7.Bd3 or 7.h3 instead: the latter two moves leave Black little choice but to enter the Modern Main Line after 7...Bg7 and 8...0-0.

==== Taimanov Attack and other lines: 7.f4 ====
With 7.f4 White stakes out even more space in the centre and threatens to overrun Black's position with a quick e4–e5. After 7...Bg7 White can transpose to the main line of the Four Pawns Attack in the King's Indian Defence with 8.Nf3 0-0 9.Be2. A rarer option is 8.e5, the Mikenas Attack, against which Black can equalize with either 8...Nfd7 or the rarer 8...dxe5 9.fxe5 Nfd7.

Position: a8 black rook, b8 black knight, c8 black bishop, d8 black queen, e8 black king, h8 black rook, a7 black pawn, b7 black pawn, f7 black pawn, g7 black bishop, h7 black pawn, d6 black pawn, f6 black knight, g6 black pawn, b5 white bishop, c5 black pawn, d5 white pawn, e4 white pawn, f4 white pawn, c3 white knight, a2 white pawn, b2 white pawn, g2 white pawn, h2 white pawn, a1 white rook, c1 white bishop, d1 white queen, e1 white king, g1 white knight, h1 white rook

Taimanov Attack: 7.f4 Bg7 8.Bb5+

By far the most popular continuation for White is 8.Bb5+, the Taimanov Attack. Analyzed by Mark Taimanov in 1956, the strength of this variation was not fully appreciated until the early 1980s. The point of the check is that both 8...Bd7 and 8...Nbd7 allow 9.e5 with advantage to White, since the knight on f6 can no longer retreat to d7. After the strongest move 8...Nfd7 the most popular move used to be 9.Bd3, preparing to meet 9...a6 with 10.a4. But in two crushing and high-profile victories with White (against Frans Andre Cuijpers at the 1980 World Junior Chess Championship in Dortmund, and against Nunn at the 1982 Olympiad in Lucerne) Kasparov showed that 9.a4 was more dangerous for Black, it having the advantage of not determining the bishop's retreat square for the time being.

White's success with this idea led some to question the soundness of the Modern Benoni, at least in its original move order. In 1982, Nunn concluded his analysis of the Taimanov with the words, "Black badly needs a new idea against 8.Bb5+ and 9.a4 to keep the Benoni in business"; two years later, he had given up the opening altogether. Other players such as Psakhis resorted to using the move order 1.d4 Nf6 2.c4 e6, only playing 3...c5 in response to 3.Nf3 to avoid the Taimanov, while choosing an entirely different opening against 3.Nc3. The damage this variation did to the opening's reputation led David Norwood to rechristen it the "Flick-Knife Attack."

Not until the 21st century did players and analysts begin to revive Black's chances in this line. First, Watson showed that the disruptive check 9...Qh4+ was playable, the point being that after 10.g3 White is no longer able to bring the bishop on c1 to the squares g3 or h4, where it can assist in White's kingside attack. Later players such as Gashimov showed that the queen check is not mandatory, and that Black also retains good chances in the line 9...0-0 10.Nf3 Na6 11.0-0 Nb4, taking advantage of the outpost on b4.

==== Knaak Variation: 7.Bd3 ====
Position: a8 black rook, b8 black knight, c8 black bishop, d8 black queen, f8 black rook, g8 black king, a7 black pawn, b7 black pawn, f7 black pawn, g7 black bishop, h7 black pawn, d6 black pawn, f6 black knight, g6 black pawn, c5 black pawn, d5 white pawn, e4 white pawn, c3 white knight, d3 white bishop, a2 white pawn, b2 white pawn, e2 white knight, f2 white pawn, g2 white pawn, h2 white pawn, a1 white rook, c1 white bishop, d1 white queen, f1 white rook, g1 white king

Knaak Variation: 7.Bd3 Bg7 8.Nge2 0-0 9.0-0

The move 7.Bd3 is sometimes used by White to enter the Modern Main Line after 7...Bg7 8.h3 without allowing Black's attempts to play an early ...Bg4. It is also the prelude to a variation championed by Rainer Knaak, 7...Bg7 8.Nge2 0-0 9.0-0. White's plan is to play for a kingside attack beginning with the moves Ng3, f2–f4, and then either e4–e5 or f4–f5. A famous demonstration of White's kingside attack was the game Penrose–Tal, Leipzig ol 1960. However, the development of the knight to e2 rules out the Nf3–d2–c4 manoeuvre, so Black is able to get quick counterplay on the queenside with ideas like ...c5–c4 followed by ...Nd7–c5.

==== Kapengut Variation: 7.f3 ====
In 1996 Albert Kapengut published a dense analysis of the move 7.f3, which now bears his name. Kapengut himself gave it the name "Half-Sämisch Variation", because the positions it leads to are often reached via transposition from the Sämisch Variation of the King's Indian Defence. The pawn on f3 overprotects e4 and prevents ...Ng4, so that White can continue 7...Bg7 8.Bg5 and retreat the bishop to e3 after ...h7–h6 without it being further harassed by Black's knight. Notable past practitioners of this line have included Viktor Korchnoi and Murray Chandler.

=== 4.Nc3 exd5 5.cxd5 d6 6.Nf3 g6 ===
Position: a8 black rook, b8 black knight, c8 black bishop, d8 black queen, e8 black king, f8 black bishop, h8 black rook, a7 black pawn, b7 black pawn, f7 black pawn, h7 black pawn, d6 black pawn, f6 black knight, g6 black pawn, c5 black pawn, d5 white pawn, c3 white knight, f3 white knight, a2 white pawn, b2 white pawn, e2 white pawn, f2 white pawn, g2 white pawn, h2 white pawn, a1 white rook, c1 white bishop, d1 white queen, e1 white king, f1 white bishop, h1 white rook

Position after 1.d4 Nf6 2.c4 c5 3.d5 e6 4.Nc3 exd5 5.cxd5 d6 6.Nf3 g6

This position arises particularly frequently through the transposition 1.d4 Nf6 2.c4 e6 3.Nf3 c5 4.d5 exd5 5.cxd5 d6 6.Nc3 g6. At this point White can still transpose to the Classical or Modern Main Lines after 7.e4. Other common alternatives are:

- 7.g3, the Fianchetto Variation;
- 7.Nd2, the Knight's Tour Variation;
- 7.Bf4;
- 7.Bg5, the Uhlmann Variation;
- and 7.h3, which is yet another attempt for White to enter the Modern Main Line without allowing an early ...Bg4. But in this move order Black can also prevent the transposition with 7...a6 (the immediate 7...Qe7? 8.e4 Nxe4?? loses the knight to 9.Qa4+) 8.a4 Qe7, which stops White from playing e2–e4.

==== Fianchetto Variation: 7.g3 ====
The Fianchetto Variation has never been considered particularly dangerous for Black to meet, since White's setup does not put Black's position under immediate pressure. However, it also offers Black no obvious target to attack—the fianchettoed bishop covers e4 and d5 and also protects White's king. Since the same bishop no longer covers the a6–f1 diagonal, White typically plays Nf3–d2–c4 to help defend against Black's queenside expansion. After further preparatory moves such as Bf4 and Re1, White may be able to push forward in the centre with e2–e4–e5. Noted proponents of the Fianchetto Variation have included strong positional players such as Viktor Korchnoi, Gennadi Sosonko and Predrag Nikolić, and after a recommendation by the influential theorist Boris Avrukh in 2010, the line has become more topical.

Position: a8 black rook, b8 black knight, c8 black bishop, d8 black queen, f8 black rook, g8 black king, a7 black pawn, b7 black pawn, f7 black pawn, g7 black bishop, h7 black pawn, d6 black pawn, f6 black knight, g6 black pawn, c5 black pawn, d5 white pawn, c3 white knight, f3 white knight, g3 white pawn, a2 white pawn, b2 white pawn, e2 white pawn, f2 white pawn, g2 white bishop, h2 white pawn, a1 white rook, c1 white bishop, d1 white queen, f1 white rook, g1 white king

Fianchetto Variation: 7.g3 Bg7 8.Bg2 0-0 9.0-0

Play typically proceeds 7.g3 Bg7 8.Bg2 0-0 9.0-0, and now the most common continuation sees Black developing in standard Benoni fashion while White manoeuvres the king's knight to c4, i.e. 9...a6 10.a4 Nbd7 11.Nd2 Re8 12.h3 Rb8 13.Nc4. Here Black can challenge White's knight with either 13...Ne5 or 13...Nb6. White may also try to develop more quickly with 11.Bf4 in order to strengthen the threat of e2–e4–e5. The idea of an early Bf4 is also effective in other variations such as 9...Re8 10.Bf4. Black too can deviate: for example, the idea of playing for ...b7–b5 after 9...Na6 10.Nd2 Nc7 is frequently seen.

The Fianchetto Variation is often reached via transposition from other openings. For instance, the position in the diagram can be reached from the King's Indian via 1.d4 Nf6 2.c4 g6 3.g3 Bg7 4.Bg2 c5 5.d5 d6 6.Nc3 0-0 7.Nf3 e6 8.0-0 exd5 9.cxd5, or from the Catalan via 1.d4 Nf6 2.c4 e6 3.g3 c5 4.d5 exd5 5.cxd5 d6 6.Nc3 g6 7.Bg2 Bg7 8.Nf3 0-0 9.0-0.

==== Knight's Tour Variation: 7.Nd2 ====
The Knight's Tour Variation 7.Nd2 immediately sends the knight towards c4, where it attacks the d-pawn; the pressure on it can be increased with moves like Bf4. Black can counter this plan with 7...Nbd7 intending 8.Nc4 Nb6, while 8.e4 Bg7 9.Be2 0-0 10.0-0 would lead to a major variation of the Classical Main Line after 10...Re8, with White having avoided Ljubojević's plan of ...Bg4.

Black is not obliged to allow this transposition though: 7...Bg7 is also playable. After 8.e4 0-0 9.Be2, Black has alternatives to 9...Re8, such as the 9...Na6 10.0-0 Ne8 Kramnik played against Leko at the 2004 World Championship, where Black intends to attack White's centre with ...f5. Alternatively, if White immediately completes the knight manoeuvre and attacks the pawn on d6 with 8.Nc4 0-0 9.Bf4, Black can either defend it with 9...Ne8 or sacrifice it with 9...Na6 or 9...b6.

==== 7.Bf4 ====
The move 7.Bf4 is similar in spirit to 7.Nd2, in that White hopes to inconvenience Black by a quick attack on d6. After 7...Bg7 8.Qa4+! Bd7 9.Qb3 White attacks both b7 and d6, and Black must be careful not to drift into a passive position after 9...Qc7 10.e4 0-0.

More commonly Black prefers to rule out White's queen check with 7...a6, which incidentally threatens to expand on the queenside. White can ignore this with 8.e4 b5 9.Qe2, aiming to quickly overrun Black in the centre with the e4–e5 advance. However, 8.a4 Bg7 is the most popular continuation, when White can aim for a transposition to the Classical Main Line with 9.e4. Another possibility is 9.h3 0-0 10.e3, which gives the bishop a retreat square in case of ...Nh5 and delays further expansion in the centre until the White's development is complete. Although a number of opening books recommended the 7.Bf4 variation for White in the early 21st century, Black appears to be able to maintain the balance in this line.

==== Uhlmann Variation: 7.Bg5 ====
The variation with 7.Bg5 is named after Wolfgang Uhlmann, who played it a few times in the 1960s. Botvinnik also employed it in his 1960 world championship match against Tal. By pinning the knight, White aims to transpose into favourable lines of the Averbakh Variation of the King's Indian Defence, which may occur after 7...0-0 8.Nd2!. To prevent this, Black can either break the pin immediately with 7...h6 8.Bh4 g5 9.Bg3 Nh5, or after developing with 7...Bg7 8.e4 h6 9.Bh4. At this point 9...g5 10.Bg3 Nh5 runs into the pawn sacrifice 11.Bb5+ Kf8 12.e5! when White has a dangerous attack, and in the late 1970s this line was even thought to have refuted the Modern Benoni. Later it was realized that Black can prevent the bishop check with 9...a6!: the only way White can forestall ...g5 and ...Nh5 is with 10.Nd2, but this allows Black to expand on the queenside with 10...b5 and reach a satisfactory position.
