= World Chess Championship 1960 =

	Defending champion	Challenger
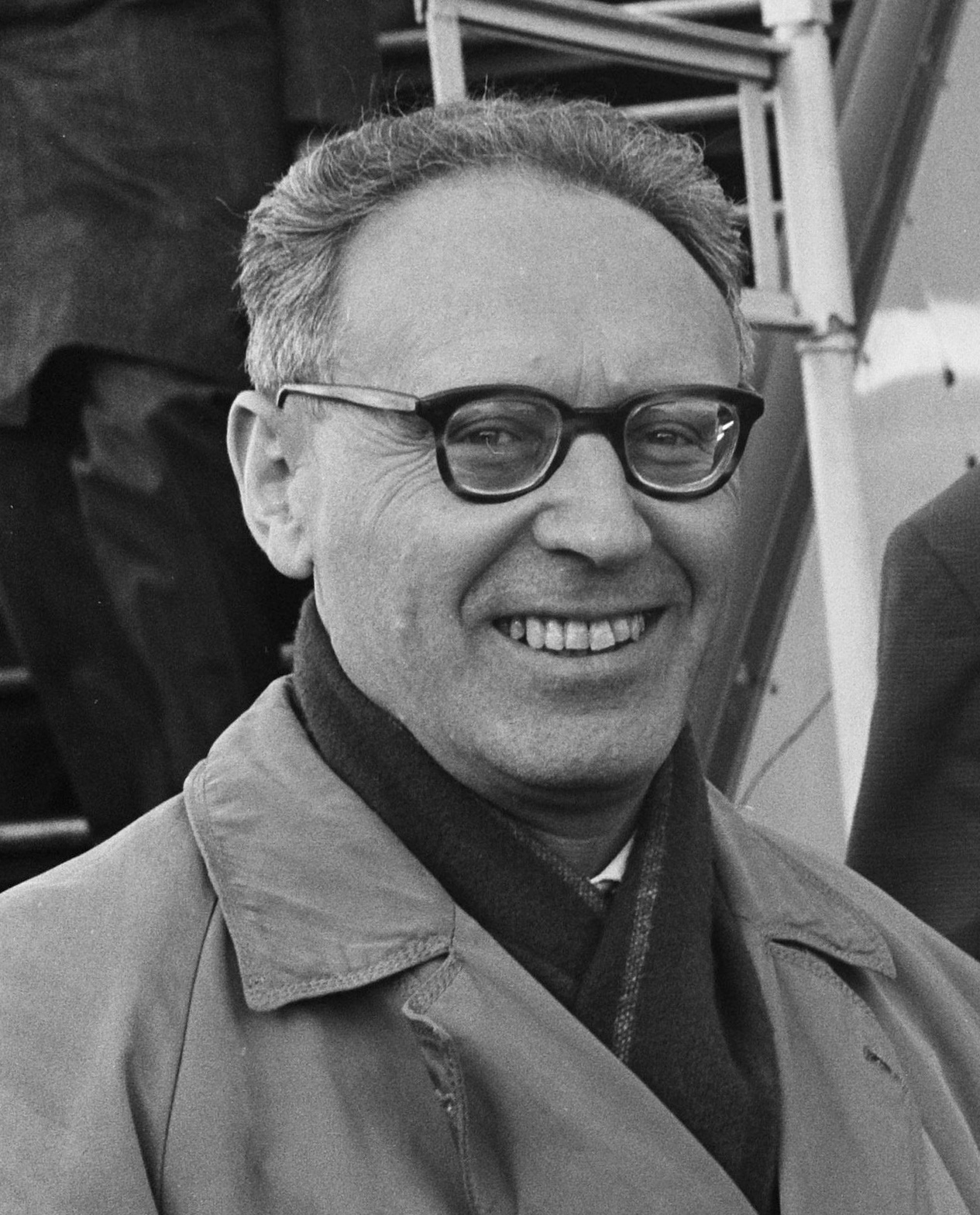
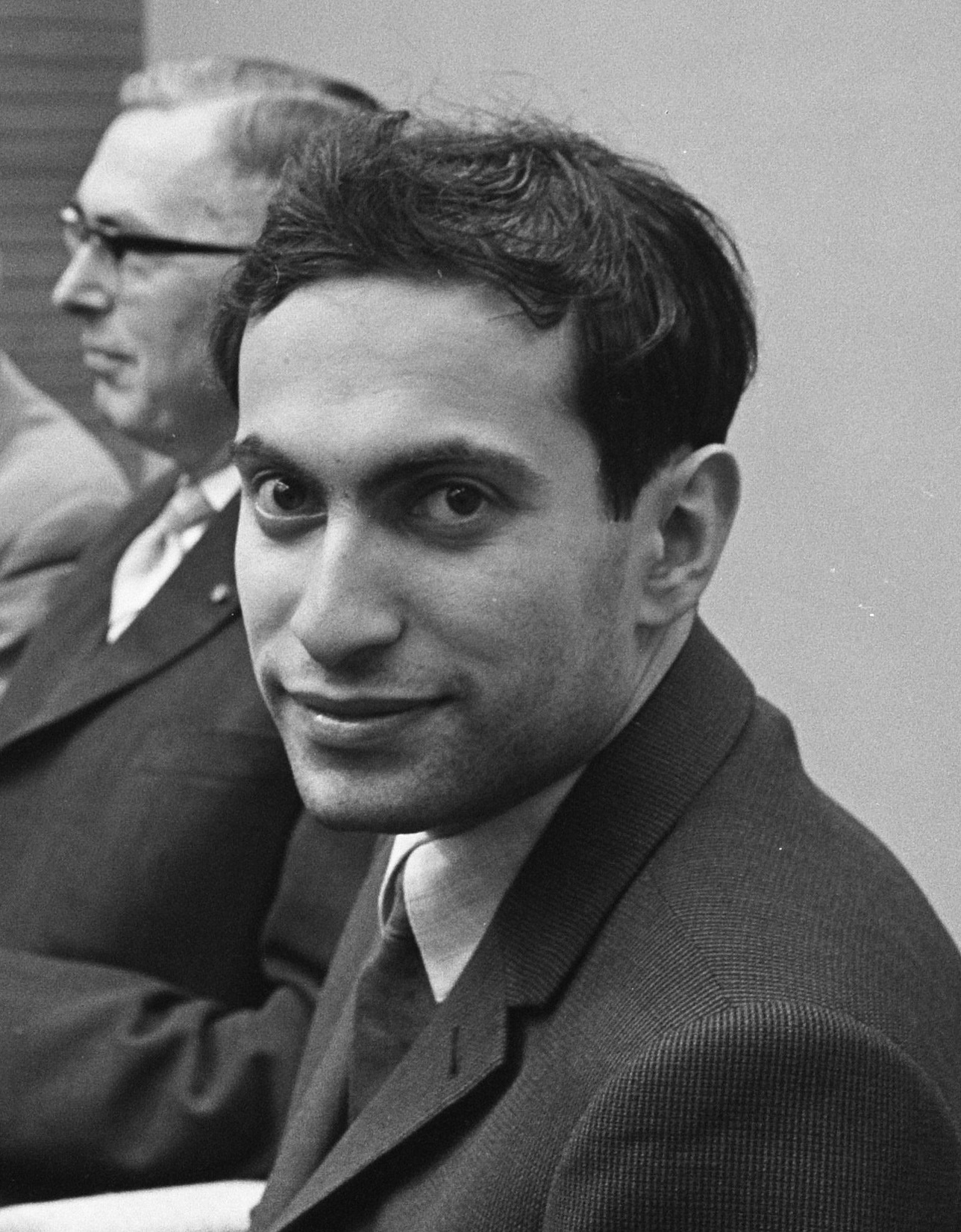
	Mikhail Botvinnik	Mikhail Tal
	(Soviet Union) Mikhail Botvinnik	(Soviet Union) Mikhail Tal
8½	Scores	12½
	Born 17 August 1911; 48 years old	Born 9 November 1936; 23 years old
	Winner of the 1958 World Chess Championship	Winner of the 1959 Candidates Tournament

A World Chess Championship was played between Mikhail Botvinnik and Mikhail Tal in Moscow from March 15 to May 7, 1960. Botvinnik was the reigning champion, after winning the World Chess Championship 1958, while Tal qualified by winning the Candidates tournament. Tal won by a margin of 4 points.

== Zonals ==
The 1958 USSR Chess Championship was a zonal, with the first four finishers qualifying for the 1958 Interzonal. The final leading scores were Tal 12½/18, Petrosian 12, Bronstein 11½ and Averbakh 11 qualifying; ahead of Boris Spassky and Lev Polugaevsky on 10½. Spassky had a strong position against Tal in the final round, but pushed too hard for a win, and lost.

The 1957/8 US Chess Championship was a zonal, with the first two finishers qualifying. The final leading scores were Bobby Fischer on 10½/13, Samuel Reshevsky on 9½ and James Sherwin on 9. Reshevsky declined his invitation to the interzonal, so the qualifiers were Fischer and Sherwin.

== 1958 Interzonal tournament ==
An interzonal chess tournament was held in Portorož, SR Slovenia, SFR Yugoslavia, in August and September 1958. The top six finishers qualified for the Candidates Tournament.

Before the final round, the leaders were: (1st) Tal 13; (2nd–3rd) Gligoric, Petrosian 12½ (though Petrosian had the bye in the last round); (4th) Benko 12; (5th–6th) Fischer, Bronstein 11½; (7th–10th) Olafsson, Averbakh, Szabo, Pachman 11. In the final round Fischer had black against Gligoric; while Bronstein, Olafsson, Szabo and Pachman had relatively weaker opponents. Feeling he was forced to play for a win, Fischer played the risky but double-edged Goteborg variation of the Sicilian Najdorf. Later, while the Gligoric–Fischer game was in a critical position with Fischer having some advantage, Fischer saw that Bronstein was unexpectedly losing to Cardoso. So Fischer accepted a draw, qualifying for the Candidates. Of the players on 11 points, only Olafsson won, joining Fischer in the last two qualifying positions.

1958 Interzonal Tournament
		1	2	3	4	5	6	7	8	9	10	11	12	13	14	15	16	17	18	19	20	21	Total
1	Mikhail Tal (Soviet Union)	x	½	½	1	½	½	½	½	0	1	½	1	1	½	½	1	½	1	½	1	1	13½
2	Svetozar Gligorić (Yugoslavia)	½	x	½	½	0	½	½	½	½	½	1	1	½	½	1	1	0	1	1	1	1	13
3	Tigran Petrosian (Soviet Union)	½	½	x	½	½	½	½	½	1	½	1	½	½	½	½	0	1	1	1	½	1	12½
4	Pal Benko (stateless)	0	½	½	x	½	1	½	1	1	½	½	0	½	1	½	½	½	½	1	1	1	12½
5	Friðrik Ólafsson (Iceland)	½	1	½	½	x	1	0	1	½	1	½	½	½	½	0	1	0	0	1	1	1	12
6	Bobby Fischer (United States)	½	½	½	0	0	x	½	½	½	½	½	½	½	1	½	1	1	½	1	1	1	12
7	David Bronstein (Soviet Union)	½	½	½	½	1	½	x	½	½	½	1	½	½	½	½	½	1	½	0	½	1	11½
8	Yuri Averbakh (Soviet Union)	½	½	½	0	0	½	½	x	1	0	½	½	½	1	1	1	½	1	½	½	1	11½
9	Aleksandar Matanović (Yugoslavia)	1	½	0	0	½	½	½	0	x	1	½	½	½	½	½	1	1	½	1	½	1	11½
10	László Szabó (Hungary)	0	½	½	½	0	½	½	1	0	x	½	½	1	½	0	½	1	1	1	1	1	11½
11	Ludek Pachman (Czechoslovakia)	½	0	0	½	½	½	0	½	½	½	x	½	½	½	1	1	1	½	1	1	1	11½
12	Oscar Panno (Argentina)	0	0	½	1	½	½	½	½	½	½	½	x	½	1	½	½	1	½	1	½	½	11
13	Miroslav Filip (Czechoslovakia)	0	½	½	½	½	½	½	½	½	0	½	½	x	½	1	½	½	½	1	1	1	11
14	Raúl Sanguineti (Argentina)	½	½	½	0	½	0	½	0	½	½	½	0	½	x	1	½	1	1	½	1	½	10
15	Oleg Neikirch (Bulgaria)	½	0	½	½	1	½	½	0	½	1	0	½	0	0	x	0	½	1	1	½	1	9½
16	Bent Larsen (Denmark)	0	0	1	½	0	0	½	0	0	½	0	½	½	½	1	x	1	1	½	0	1	8½
17	James Sherwin (United States)	½	1	0	½	1	0	0	½	0	0	0	0	½	0	½	0	x	1	0	1	1	7½
18	Héctor Rossetto (Argentina)	0	0	0	½	1	½	½	0	½	0	½	½	½	0	0	0	0	x	1	½	1	7
19	Rodolfo Cardoso (Philippines)	½	0	0	0	0	0	1	½	0	0	0	0	0	½	0	½	1	0	x	1	1	6
20	Boris de Greiff (Colombia)	0	0	½	0	0	0	½	½	½	0	0	½	0	0	½	1	0	½	0	x	0	4½
21	Géza Füster (Canada)	0	0	0	0	0	0	0	0	0	0	0	½	0	½	0	0	0	0	0	1	x	2

== 1959 Candidates Tournament ==
The 1959 Candidates Tournament was held in Yugoslavia in Bled, Zagreb, and Belgrade in September and October 1959. The top two players from the previous tournament, Vasily Smyslov and Paul Keres, were seeded directly into the tournament and joined by the top six from the interzonal. Mikhail Tal won, becoming the challenger in the 1960 championship match.

The tournament was notable in that the two top finishers, Tal and Keres, scored heavily against the bottom of the field. If only scores between the top four are taken into account, the results of the top four are quite similar (Tal 5½/12, Keres 6½/12, Petrosian and Smyslov both 6/12). But Tal and Keres scored heavily against the bottom four, with Tal scoring an incredible 14½/16, including winning all four of his games against Fischer.

Future world champion Bobby Fischer was 16 years old at the time. He was the youngest Candidate in history until Magnus Carlsen qualified for the 2007 Candidates under a different system.

1959 Candidates Tournament
		1	2	3	4	5	6	7	8	Score
1	Mikhail Tal (Soviet Union)	xxxx	0 0 1 0	½ ½ ½ ½	0 1 ½ 1	1 ½ 1 1	1 1 1 1	1 1 1 ½	1 1 1 ½	20
2	Paul Keres (Soviet Union)	1 1 0 1	xxxx	0 ½ ½ ½	1 ½ ½ 0	½ ½ 1 1	0 1 0 1	1 1 1 0	1 1 1 1	18½
3	Tigran Petrosian (Soviet Union)	½ ½ ½ ½	1 ½ ½ ½	xxxx	½ ½ 0 ½	0 ½ ½ 1	1 1 ½ ½	1 0 0 ½	½ 1 1 ½	15½
4	Vasily Smyslov (Soviet Union)	1 0 ½ 0	0 ½ ½ 1	½ ½ 1 ½	xxxx	0 ½ 1 0	½ ½ 1 0	½ 1 ½ 1	½ 0 1 1	15
5	Svetozar Gligorić (Yugoslavia)	0 ½ 0 0	½ ½ 0 0	1 ½ ½ 0	1 ½ 0 1	xxxx	0 1 ½ ½	½ ½ 1 0	½ 1 ½ ½	12½
6	Bobby Fischer (United States)	0 0 0 0	1 0 1 0	0 0 ½ ½	½ ½ 0 1	1 0 ½ ½	xxxx	0 1 ½ 1	½ 1 ½ 1	12½
7	Friðrik Ólafsson (Iceland)	0 0 0 ½	0 0 0 1	0 1 1 ½	½ 0 ½ 0	½ ½ 0 1	1 0 ½ 0	xxxx	0 0 ½ 1	10
8	Pal Benko (stateless)	0 0 0 ½	0 0 0 0	½ 0 0 ½	½ 1 0 0	½ 0 ½ ½	½ 0 ½ 0	1 1 ½ 0	xxxx	8

=== Round 1, Bled ===
The 1959 Candidates was the first time Tal and Smyslov played each other in a tournament. The adjourned games Smyslov–Tal and Keres–Fischer were completed on Wednesday September 9.

Round 1, Bled, Monday September 7
White	Black	Result	Opening	Moves
Smyslov	Tal	1–0	Sicilian Defense, Najdorf Variation	65
Keres	Fischer	0–1	Sicilian Defense, Najdorf Variation	53
Petrosian	Olafsson	1–0	Nimzo-Indian Defense, Three Knights Variation	37
Benko	Gligorić	½–½	King's Indian Defense	35

=== Round 2, Bled ===
Tal–Gligorić was the only game to finish in the first session of play.

Round 2, Bled, Tuesday September 8
White	Black	Result	Opening	Moves
Fischer (1)	Petrosian (1)	0–1	Caro–Kann Defense, Two Knights Variation	68
Smyslov (1)	Keres (0)	0–1	Ruy Lopez, Chigorin Defense	59
Tal (0)	Gligorić (½)	1–0	King's Indian Defence, Sämisch Variation	47
Olafsson (0)	Benko (½)	0–1	Ruy Lopez, Flohr–Zaitsev Variation	54

=== Round 3, Bled ===
Round 3, Bled, Thursday September 10
White	Black	Result	Opening	Moves
Petrosian (2)	Smyslov (1)	½–½	English Opening, Reversed Sicilian	60
Benko (1½)	Fischer (1)	½–½	King's Indian Defense	49
Keres (1)	Tal (1)	1–0	English Opening	64
Gligorić (½)	Olafsson (0)	½–½	Nimzo-Indian Defense, Rubinstein System	54

=== Round 4, Bled ===
Round 4, Bled, Friday September 11
White	Black	Result	Opening	Moves
Keres (2)	Petrosian (2½)	0–1	Sicilian Defense, Accelerated Dragon, Maróczy Bind	51
Smyslov (1½)	Benko (2)	½–½	Sicilian Defense, Najdorf Variation	28
Fischer (1½)	Gligorić (1)	1–0	Sicilian Defense, Dragon Variation	32
Tal (1)	Olafsson (½)	1–0	Sicilian Defense, Najdorf Variation	42

=== Round 5, Bled ===
Petrosian and Tal made the first "grandmaster draw" in this tournament with their game lasting only 12 moves. Benko lost on time, and his written protest to the tournament committee was denied after the chess clock was examined and found to be working correctly.

Round 5, Bled, Monday September 14
White	Black	Result	Opening	Moves
Petrosian (3½)	Tal (2)	½–½	Semi-Tarrasch Defense	12
Benko (2½)	Keres (2)	0–1	English Opening, Reverse Sicilian	39
Olafsson (½)	Fischer (2½)	1–0	Sicilian Defense, Najdorf Variation	45
Gligorić (1)	Smyslov (2)	1–0	Slav Defense	38

=== Round 6, Bled ===
Round 6, Bled, Tuesday September 15
White	Black	Result	Opening	Moves
Petrosian (4)	Benko (2½)	½–½	King's Indian Defense, Fianchetto Variation	42
Keres (3)	Gligorić (2)	½–½	Ruy Lopez, Modern Steinitz Defense	66
Tal (2½)	Fischer (2½)	1–0	King's Indian Defense, Petrosian Variation	41
Smyslov (2)	Olafsson (1½)	½–½	Sicilian Defense, Kan Variation	67

=== Round 7, Bled ===
Round 7, Bled, Thursday September 17
White	Black	Result	Opening	Moves
Gligorić (2½)	Petrosian (4½)	1–0	Caro–Kann Defense, Classical Variation	40
Benko (3)	Tal (3½)	0–1	Dutch Defense	29
Olafsson (2)	Keres (3½)	0–1	Réti Opening	40
Fischer (2½)	Smyslov (2½)	½–½	Caro–Kann Defense, Two Knights Variation	41

=== Round 8, Belgrade ===
Round 8, Belgrade, Friday September 18
White	Black	Result	Opening	Moves
Tal (4½)	Smyslov (3)	1–0	Caro–Kann Defense	26
Fischer (3)	Keres (4½)	0–1	Caro–Kann Defense, Two Knights Variation	30
Olafsson (2)	Petrosian (4½)	1–0	Queen's Gambit Declined, Ragozin Variation	66
Gligorić (3½)	Benko (3)	1–0	Ruy Lopez, Breyer Defense	55

=== Round 9, Belgrade ===
Round 9, Belgrade, Monday September 21
White	Black	Result	Opening	Moves
Gligorić (4½)	Tal (5½)	½–½	Ruy Lopez, Chigorin Defense	26
Keres (5½)	Smyslov (3)	½–½	Ruy Lopez	41
Petrosian (4½)	Fischer (3)	1–0	Nimzo-Indian Defense, Rubinstein System	31
Benko (3)	Olafsson (4½)	1–0	Sicilian Defense, Najdorf Variation	42

=== Round 10, Belgrade ===
Round 10, Belgrade, Tuesday September 22
White	Black	Result	Opening	Moves
Tal (6)	Keres (6)	0–1	Nimzo-Indian Defense, 4.f3	40
Smyslov (3½)	Petrosian (5½)	½–½	English Opening	28
Olafsson (3)	Gligorić (5)	½–½	King's Indian Defense	73
Fischer (3)	Benko (4)	1–0	Sicilian Defense	27

=== Round 11, Belgrade ===
Round 11, Belgrade, Thursday September 24
White	Black	Result	Opening	Moves
Petrosian (6)	Keres (7)	½–½	English Opening, Reversed Sicilian	25
Olafsson (3½)	Tal (6)	0–1	Sicilian Defense, Kan Variation	71
Gligorić (5½)	Fischer (4)	1–0	Sicilian Defense, Najdorf Variation	43
Benko (4)	Smyslov (4)	1–0	Sicilian Defense, Kan Variation	74

=== Round 12, Belgrade ===
Round 12, Belgrade, Friday September 25
White	Black	Result	Opening	Moves
Keres (7½)	Benko (5)	1–0	Ruy Lopez, Breyer Variation	21
Tal (7)	Petrosian (6½)	½–½	Ruy Lopez, Chigorin Variation	23
Smyslov (4)	Gligorić (6½)	½–½	Nimzo-Indian Defense, Rubinstein System	59
Fischer (4)	Olafsson (3½)	1–0	Ruy Lopez, Modern Steinitz Variation	78

=== Round 13, Belgrade ===
Round 13, Belgrade, Monday September 28
White	Black	Result	Opening	Moves
Gligorić (7)	Keres (8½)	½–½	Nimzo-Indian Defense, Rubinstein System	72
Fischer (5)	Tal (7½)	0–1	Sicilian Defense, Najdorf Variation	33
Benko (5)	Petrosian (7)	0–1	Réti Opening	34
Olafsson (3½)	Smyslov (4½)	0–1	English Opening, Reversed Sicilian	57

=== Round 14, Belgrade ===
Round 14, Belgrade, Tuesday September 29
White	Black	Result	Opening	Moves
Keres (9)	Olafsson (3½)	1–0	Sicilian Defense, Kan Variation	41
Tal (8½)	Benko (5)	1–0	Sicilian Defense, Hyper-Accelerated Dragon Variation	30
Petrosian (8)	Gligorić (7½)	½–½	English Opening, Symmetrical Variation	18
Smyslov (5½)	Fischer (5)	½–½	Sicilian Defense, Delayed Alapin Variation	46

=== Round 15, Zagreb ===
Round 15, Zagreb, Saturday October 3
White	Black	Result	Opening	Moves
Keres (10)	Fischer (5½)	0–1	London System	27
Smyslov (6)	Tal (9½)	½–½	Sicilian Defense, Kan Variation	46
Petrosian (8½)	Olafsson (3½)	0–1	Nimzo-Indian Defense, Rubinstein System	76
Benko (5)	Gligorić (8)	½–½	Semi-Tarrasch Defense	44

=== Round 16, Zagreb ===
Tal's win against Gligorić in round 16 gave him the tournament lead over Keres, and he never relinquished it.

Round 16, Zagreb, Sunday October 4
White	Black	Result	Opening	Moves
Tal (10)	Gligorić (8½)	1–0	Queen's Indian Defense	64
Smyslov (6½)	Keres (10)	½–½	Nimzo-Indian Defense. Rubinstein System	35
Fischer (6½)	Petrosian (8½)	½–½	Caro–Kann Defense, Two Knights Variation	48
Olafsson (4½)	Benko (5½)	½–½	English Opening, Symmetrical Variation	32

=== Round 17, Zagreb ===
After the tournament, Tal said the turning point was his round 17 win over Keres that gave him a 1½-point lead.

Round 17, Zagreb, Tuesday October 6
White	Black	Result	Opening	Moves
Keres (10½)	Tal (11)	0–1	Sicilian Defense, Kan Variation	40
Petrosian (9)	Smyslov (7)	0–1	Queen's Gambit Accepted	39
Benko (6)	Fischer (7)	½–½	Sicilian Defense, Najdorf Variation	64
Gligorić (8½)	Olafsson (5)	1–0	Ruy Lopez, Closed with 9...Nd7	51

=== Round 18, Zagreb ===
Round 18, Zagreb, Wednesday October 7
White	Black	Result	Opening	Moves
Tal (12)	Olafsson (5)	1–0	Ruy Lopez, Closed with 9...Nd7	42
Keres (10½)	Petrosian (9)	½–½	Caro–Kann Defense, Panov Attack	18
Fischer (7½)	Gligorić (9½)	½–½	Ruy Lopez, Modern Steinitz Defense	39
Smyslov (8)	Benko (6½)	1–0	King's Indian Defense, Petrosian Variation	53

=== Round 19, Zagreb ===
Round 18, Zagreb, Saturday October 10
White	Black	Result	Opening	Moves
Petrosian (9½)	Tal (13)	½–½	Nimzo-Indian Defense, Classical Variation	15
Benko (6½)	Keres (11)	0–1	English Opening, Reversed Sicilian	41
Gligorić (10)	Smyslov (9)	0–1	Nimzo-Indian Defense, Rubinstein System	50
Olafsson (5)	Fischer (8)	½–½	King's Indian Defense, Fianchetto Variation	40

=== Round 20, Zagreb ===
Round 20, Zagreb, Sunday October 11
White	Black	Result	Opening	Moves
Tal (13½)	Fischer (8½)	1–0	King's Indian Defense, Petrosian Variation	34
Keres (12)	Gligorić (10)	1–0	Ruy Lopez, Chigorin Defense	45
Petrosian (10)	Benko (6½)	1–0	Nimzo-Indian Defense, Leningrad Variation	41
Smyslov (10)	Olafsson (5½)	½–½	Sicilian Defense, Grand Prix Attack	37

=== Round 21, Zagreb ===
Round 21, Zagreb, Tuesday October 13
White	Black	Result	Opening	Moves
Benko (6½)	Tal (14½)	0–1	Sicilian Defense, Najdorf Variation	33
Olafsson (6)	Keres (13)	0–1	Queen's Gambit Accepted	35
Gligorić (10)	Petrosian (11)	½–½	French Defense, Winawer Variation	41
Fischer (8½)	Smyslov (10½)	0–1	Sicilian Defense, Scheveningen Variation	48

=== Round 22, Zagreb ===
Round 22, Zagreb, Sunday October 18
White	Black	Result	Opening	Moves
Tal (15½)	Smyslov (11½)	1–0	Sicilian Defense, Scheveningen Variation	41
Fischer (8½)	Keres (14)	0–1	Caro–Kann Defense, Two Knights Variation	55
Olafsson (6)	Petrosian (11½)	½–½	Queen's Gambit Declined, Tartakower Defense	41
Gligorić (10½)	Benko (6½)	½–½	Sicilian Defense, Richter-Rauzer Variation	57

=== Round 23, Belgrade ===
Round 23, Belgrade, Monday October 19
White	Black	Result	Opening	Moves
Gligorić (11)	Tal (16½)	0–1	Modern Benoni	46
Keres (15)	Smyslov (11½)	0–1	Sicilian Defense, Scheveningen Variation	40
Petrosian (12)	Fischer (8½)	½–½	Queen's Gambit Declined, Tartakower Defense	30
Benko (7)	Olafsson (6½)	0–1	Queen's Gambit Accepted	44

=== Round 24, Belgrade ===
Round 24, Belgrade, Wednesday October 21
White	Black	Result	Opening	Moves
Tal (17½)	Keres (15)	0–1	Tarrasch Defense	79
Smyslov (12½)	Petrosian (12½)	½–½	King's Indian Defense	23
Olafsson (7½)	Gligorić (11)	1–0	King's Indian Defense, Petrosian Variation	70
Fischer (9)	Benko (7)	1–0	Caro–Kann Defense, Two Knights Variation	39

=== Round 25, Belgrade ===
Round 25, Belgrade, Thursday October 22
White	Black	Result	Opening	Moves
Olafsson (8½)	Tal (17½)	0–1	King's Indian Defense, Fianchetto Variation	17
Petrosian (13)	Keres (16)	1–0	Tarrasch Defense	18
Benko (7)	Smyslov (13)	1–0	Catalan Opening	34
Gligorić (11)	Fischer (10)	½–½	Sicilian Defense, Najdorf Variation	57

=== Round 26, Belgrade ===
Round 26, Belgrade, Sunday October 25
White	Black	Result	Opening	Moves
Tal (18)	Petrosian (13½)	½–½	Sicilian Defense	25
Keres (16½)	Benko (7)	1–0	Sicilian Defense, Najdorf Variation	23
Smyslov (14)	Gligorić (11½)	0–1	King's Indian Defense	18
Fischer (10½)	Olafsson (9)	1–0	Caro–Kann Defense, Two Knights Variation	41

=== Round 27, Belgrade ===
Round 27, Belgrade, Monday October 26
White	Black	Result	Opening	Moves
Fischer (11½)	Tal (18½)	0–1	Sicilian Defense, Najdorf Variation	52
Gligorić (12½)	Keres (17½)	0–1	Nimzo-Indian Defense, Rubinstein System	40
Olafsson (9)	Smyslov (14)	0–1	English Opening, Reversed Sicilian	41
Benko (7)	Petrosian (14)	½–½	Queen's Gambit Accepted	43

=== Round 28, Belgrade ===
Round 28, Belgrade, Thursday October 28
White	Black	Result	Opening	Moves
Tal (19½)	Benko (7½)	½–½	Sicilian Defense, Hyper-Accelerated Dragon	22
Keres (18½)	Olafsson (9)	0–1	Sicilian Defense, O'Kelly Variation	40
Smyslov (15)	Fischer (11½)	0–1	Sicilian Defense, Najdorf Variation	54
Petrosian (14½)	Gligorić (12½)	1–0	King's Indian Defense, Petrosian Variation	45

== 1960 Championship match ==
The best of 24 game match was held in Moscow. In the event of a 12–12 tie, Botvinnik, the title holder, would retain the Championship.

Due to Tal's less impressive results against the very top players, including his three losses to Keres in the Candidates, Botvinnik was the favorite. Tal won the match decisively, however, by a margin of 4 points.

World Chess Championship Match 1960
	1	2	3	4	5	6	7	8	9	10	11	12	13	14	15	16	17	18	19	20	21	Points
Mikhail Tal (Soviet Union)	1	½	½	½	½	1	1	0	0	½	1	½	½	½	½	½	1	½	1	½	½	12½
Mikhail Botvinnik (Soviet Union)	0	½	½	½	½	0	0	1	1	½	0	½	½	½	½	½	0	½	0	½	½	8½

=== Game 1: Tal–Botvinnik, 1–0 ===
Tal–Botvinnik, game 1

Position: g8 black rook, a7 black pawn, c7 black king, f7 black queen, b6 black pawn, c6 black bishop, g6 black knight, d5 black pawn, f5 black pawn, g5 white bishop, c4 white pawn, d4 white rook, h4 white pawn, a3 white pawn, e3 white pawn, g2 white pawn, d1 white queen, e1 white king, f1 white bishop

Position after 29.c4. Here Tal remarked that the move caused a forced material advantage for White, as 29...Ne7 can be met by 30.cxd5 Bxd5 (or 30...Nxd5 31.Bc4) 31.Bxe7 Qxe7 32.Qc1+ which would have been completely lost for Black.
French Defence, Winawer Variation (ECO C18)
1.e4 e6 2.d4 d5 3.Nc3 Bb4 4.e5 c5 5.a3 Bc3 6.bc3 Qc7 7.Qg4 f5 8.Qg3 Ne7 9.Qg7 Rg8 10.Qh7 cd4 11.Kd1 Bd7 12.Qh5 Ng6 13.Ne2 d3 14.cd3 Ba4 15.Ke1 Qe5 16.Bg5 Nc6 17.d4 Qc7 18.h4 e5 19.Rh3 Qf7 20.de5 Nce5 21.Re3 Kd7 22.Rb1 b6 23.Nf4 Rae8 24.Rb4 Bc6 25.Qd1 Nf4 26.Rf4 Ng6 27.Rd4 Re3 28.fe3 Kc7 29.c4 (see diagram) dc4 30.Bc4 Qg7 31.Bg8 Qg8 32.h5 1–0

=== Game 6: Botvinnik–Tal, 0–1 ===
Botvinnik–Tal, game 6

Position: c8 black rook, g8 black king, a7 black pawn, b7 black pawn, g7 black bishop, h7 black pawn, d6 black pawn, g6 black pawn, d5 white pawn, e5 black pawn, f5 black bishop, h5 black knight, b4 black queen, c4 black rook, c3 white knight, e3 white bishop, g3 white pawn, h3 white pawn, a2 white pawn, b2 white pawn, e2 white queen, f2 white pawn, g2 white bishop, h2 white king, a1 white rook, c1 white rook

Position after 21.Ra1. Tal now sacrificed a knight with the speculative 21...Nf4!?, and won in the ensuing complications.

Game 6 is particularly famous, thanks to a speculative knight sacrifice by Tal on move 21. The audience became so excited that the game was moved to a back room due to the noise.

King's Indian Defence, Fianchetto Variation (ECO E69)
1.c4 Nf6 2.Nf3 g6 3.g3 Bg7 4.Bg2 0-0 5.d4 d6 6.Nc3 Nbd7 7.0-0 e5 8.e4 c6 9.h3 Qb6 10.d5 cd5 11.cd5 Nc5 12.Ne1 Bd7 13.Nd3 Nd3 14.Qd3 Rfc8 15.Rb1 Nh5 16.Be3 Qb4 17.Qe2 Rc4 18.Rfc1 Rac8 19.Kh2 f5 20.ef5 Bf5 21.Ra1 (see diagram) Nf4 22.gf4 ef4 23.Bd2 Qb2 24.Rab1 f3 25.Rb2 fe2 26.Rb3 Rd4 27.Be1 Be5 28.Kg1 Bf4 29.Ne2 Rc1 30.Nd4 Re1 31.Bf1 Be4 32.Ne2 Be5 33.f4 Bf6 34.Rb7 Bd5 35.Rc7 Ba2 36.Ra7 Bc4 37.Ra8 Kf7 38.Ra7 Ke6 39.Ra3 d5 40.Kf2 Bh4 41.Kg2 Kd6 42.Ng3 Bg3 43.Bc4 dc4 44.Kg3 Kd5 45.Ra7 c3 46.Rc7 Kd4 47.Rd7 0–1

=== Game 17: Tal–Botvinnik, 1–0 ===
Tal–Botvinnik, game 17

Position: a8 black rook, e8 black king, h8 black rook, a7 black pawn, b7 black pawn, d7 black knight, f7 black pawn, g7 black pawn, c6 black pawn, d6 black bishop, e6 black pawn, f6 black knight, g6 black pawn, a5 black queen, g5 white bishop, c4 white bishop, d4 white pawn, f4 white pawn, g3 white knight, a2 white pawn, b2 white pawn, c2 white pawn, g2 white pawn, h2 white pawn, a1 white rook, d1 white queen, f1 white rook, g1 white king

Position after 12.f4

Game 17 was a 41-move win for Tal. Tal (White) described the move 12.f4 as "memorable". He believed that the move would throw Botvinnik off and that it could only be exploited by opening the game for Tal's bishops.

Caro–Kann Defence, Classical Variation (ECO B18)
1.e4 c6 2.d4 d5 3.Nc3 de4 4.Ne4 Bf5 5.Ng3 Bg6 6.Bc4 e6 7.N1e2 Nf6 8.Nf4 Bd6 9.Ng6 hg6 10.Bg5 Nbd7 11.0-0 Qa5 12.f4 (diagram) 0-0-0 13.a3 Qc7 14.b4 Nb6 15.Be2 Be7 16.Qd3 Nfd5 17.Be7 Qe7 18.c4 Nf6 19.Rab1 Qd7 20.Rbd1 Kb8 21.Qb3 Qc7 22.a4 Rh4 23.a5 Nc8 24.Qe3 Ne7 25.Qe5 Rhh8 26.b5 cb5 27.Qb5 a6 28.Qb2 Rd7 29.c5 Ka8 30.Bf3 Nc6 31.Bc6 Qc6 32.Rf3 Qa4 33.Rfd3 Rc8 34.Rb1 Qa5 35.Rb3 Qc7 36.Qa3 Ka7 37.Rb6 Qf4 38.Ne2 Qe4 39.Qb3 Qd5 40.Ra6 Kb8 41.Qa4 1–0

== See also ==
- World Chess Championship 1961
