= Nimzo-Indian Defence =

Chess opening

Position: a8 black rook, b8 black knight, c8 black bishop, d8 black queen, e8 black king, h8 black rook, a7 black pawn, b7 black pawn, c7 black pawn, d7 black pawn, f7 black pawn, g7 black pawn, h7 black pawn, e6 black pawn, f6 black knight, b4 black bishop, c4 white pawn, d4 white pawn, c3 white knight, a2 white pawn, b2 white pawn, e2 white pawn, f2 white pawn, g2 white pawn, h2 white pawn, a1 white rook, c1 white bishop, d1 white queen, e1 white king, f1 white bishop, g1 white knight, h1 white rook
- Moves: 1.d4 Nf6 2.c4 e6 3.Nc3 Bb4
- ECO: E20–E59
- Origin: Englisch vs. Blackburne, London 1883
- Named after: Aron Nimzowitsch
- Parent: Indian Defence

The Nimzo-Indian Defence is a chess opening characterised by the moves:

1. d4 Nf6
2. c4 e6
3. Nc3 Bb4

Other move orders, such as 1.c4 e6 2.Nc3 Nf6 3.d4 Bb4, are also feasible. In the Encyclopaedia of Chess Openings, the Nimzo-Indian is classified as E20–E59.

This hypermodern opening was developed by Aron Nimzowitsch who introduced it to master-level chess in the early 20th century. Unlike most Indian openings, the Nimzo-Indian does not involve an immediate fianchetto, although Black often follows up with ...b6 and ...Bb7. By pinning White's knight, Black prevents the threatened 4.e4 and seeks to inflict doubled pawns on White. White will attempt to create a pawn centre and develop their pieces to prepare for an assault on the Black position.

Black's delay in committing to a pawn structure makes the Nimzo-Indian (sometimes colloquially referred to as the "Nimzo") a very flexible defence to 1.d4. It can also transpose into lines of the Queen's Gambit or Queen's Indian Defence. The Nimzo-Indian is a highly respected defence to 1.d4, is played at all levels and has been played by every world champion since Capablanca. White often plays 3.g3 or 3.Nf3 to avoid the Nimzo-Indian, allowing them to meet 3.Nf3 Bb4+ (the Bogo-Indian Defence) with 4.Bd2 or 4.Nbd2, rather than 4.Nc3.

== General considerations ==
Botvinnik vs. Reshevsky, 1948

Position: c8 black rook, d8 black rook, g8 black king, a7 black pawn, h7 black pawn, a6 black bishop, b6 black pawn, e6 black pawn, g6 black pawn, a5 black knight, c5 black pawn, e5 white pawn, f5 black pawn, h5 black knight, a4 black queen, c4 white pawn, f4 white pawn, a3 white pawn, c3 white pawn, d3 white bishop, e3 white knight, g3 white bishop, a2 white queen, g2 white pawn, h2 white pawn, d1 white rook, e1 white rook, g1 white king

Position after 24.Qe2–a2

In the Nimzo-Indian, Black is generally prepared to concede the bishop pair by playing Bxc3. As dynamic compensation, they often double White's c-pawns, which represent a static weakness, and gains play against the central light squares d5 and e4, even in those instances where White is able to recapture with a piece after ...Bxc3. By pinning the knight to the king, black indirectly controls the center by preventing the move e4. Black will aim to close the position to reduce the scope of White's bishops. To this end, Black must blockade the white pawn centre from advancing and neutralise White's attacking chances on the kingside. An example of Black's strategy carried out successfully is the game Mikhail Botvinnik–Samuel Reshevsky from the 1948 World Chess Championship, which reached the position in the diagram after White's 24th move.

Earlier in the game, Reshevsky was able to block White's kingside attack by playing ...Nf6–e8 and ...f7–f5. Now, both White's bishops are reduced to defence, and White's queen is reduced to passivity at the a2-square to defend the pawns on a3 and c4. Without prospects for counterplay, White's game is strategically hopeless, and Black ultimately exchanged queens and won the endgame.

== Rubinstein System: 4.e3 ==
Position: a8 black rook, b8 black knight, c8 black bishop, d8 black queen, e8 black king, h8 black rook, a7 black pawn, b7 black pawn, c7 black pawn, d7 black pawn, f7 black pawn, g7 black pawn, h7 black pawn, e6 black pawn, f6 black knight, b4 black bishop, c4 white pawn, d4 white pawn, c3 white knight, e3 white pawn, a2 white pawn, b2 white pawn, f2 white pawn, g2 white pawn, h2 white pawn, a1 white rook, c1 white bishop, d1 white queen, e1 white king, f1 white bishop, g1 white knight, h1 white rook

Position after 4.e3

The Rubinstein System (named after Akiba Rubinstein) is White's most common method of combating the Nimzo-Indian. Svetozar Gligorić and Lajos Portisch made great contributions to the theory and practice of this line at top level during their careers. White continues their development before committing to a definite plan of action. In reply, Black has three main moves to choose from: 4...0-0, 4...c5, and 4...b6. In addition, Black sometimes plays 4...d5 or 4...Nc6. The move 4...d5 can transpose to lines arising from 4...0-0, but White has the extra option of 5.a3, known as the Botvinnik Variation. 4...Nc6 is the Taimanov Variation.

=== Main line: 4...0-0 5.Bd3 d5 6.Nf3 c5 7.0-0 ===
Position: a8 black rook, b8 black knight, c8 black bishop, d8 black queen, f8 black rook, g8 black king, a7 black pawn, b7 black pawn, f7 black pawn, g7 black pawn, h7 black pawn, e6 black pawn, f6 black knight, c5 black pawn, d5 black pawn, b4 black bishop, c4 white pawn, d4 white pawn, c3 white knight, d3 white bishop, e3 white pawn, f3 white knight, a2 white pawn, b2 white pawn, f2 white pawn, g2 white pawn, h2 white pawn, a1 white rook, c1 white bishop, d1 white queen, f1 white rook, g1 white king

Main line: 4.e3 0-0 5.Bd3 d5 6.Nf3 c5 7.0-0

Black's most flexible and frequently played response is 4...0-0. The main line continues 5.Bd3 d5 6.Nf3 c5 7.0-0, reaching the position in the diagram where White has completed kingside development, while Black has claimed a share of the centre. At this point, the most important continuations are:

7...dxc4 8.Bxc4 Nbd7 (Parma Variation)
7...dxc4 8.Bxc4 cxd4 9.exd4 b6 (Karpov Variation)
7...dxc4 8.Bxc4 Nc6 9.a3 Ba5 (Larsen Variation)
7...Nc6 8.a3 Bxc3 9.bxc3 dxc4 10.Bxc4 Qc7 (main variation)
7...Nc6 8.a3 Bxc3 9.bxc3 Qc7 (Khasin Variation)
7...Nbd7 (Averbakh Variation)

==== Parma Variation: 7...dxc4 8.Bxc4 Nbd7 ====
The Parma Variation (7...dxc4 8.Bxc4 Nbd7) is named after Slovenian grandmaster (GM) Bruno Parma, and can sometimes transpose to the Karpov Variation if pawns are exchanged on d4. White usually continues with 9.Qe2, clearing the d1-square for the rook, which will assist in the advance of the d-pawn. Black then faces an important decision. They may play 9...b6, with the intention of playing ...cxd4 at some point to isolate the d-pawn and blockade it, or exchange on c3 as well to play against the isolated c3–d4 pawn couple. Or, they can consider 9...a6 to grab space on the queenside with ...b5. In this case, Black will usually retain their dark-squared bishop.

==== Black's eighth-move alternatives ====
After 7...dxc4 8.Bxc4, Black also has two rare alternatives on their eighth move worth mentioning:

- 8...Qe7 intending ...Rd8 is the Smyslov Variation, named after world champion Vasily Smyslov.
- 8...Bd7 followed by ...Bc6 is the Bronstein Variation, named after world championship finalist David Bronstein.

==== Karpov Variation: 7...dxc4 8.Bxc4 cxd4 9.exd4 b6 ====
The Karpov Variation (7...dxc4 8.Bxc4 cxd4 9.exd4 b6), named after world champion Anatoly Karpov, is one of Black's most reliable defences to the Rubinstein System. For the moment, White has an isolated pawn in the d-file, even so, Black plans to play ...Bxc3 at some point and follow up with ...Bb7, ...Nbd7, ...R(a)c8 and ...Qc7 to restrain White's c- and d-pawns. After 7...dxc4 8.Bxc4 cxd4 9.exd4 b6 the game usually continues 10.Bg5 Bb7, when 11.Ne5, 11.Re1, 11.Rc1 and 11.Qe2 are all good moves for White.

==== Larsen Variation: 7...dxc4 8.Bxc4 Nc6 9.a3 Ba5 ====
The Larsen Variation, named after GM Bent Larsen) can be reached by either 7...dxc4 8.Bxc4 Nc6 9.a3 Ba5 or 7...Nc6 8.a3 dxc4 9.Bxc4 Ba5, but the latter move order gives White the extra option of 9.axb4. The idea is to wait until White plays dxc5 before playing ...Bxc3. If White does not oblige, then Black will play ...Bb6 with pressure on the d-pawn. The point of inserting ...dxc4 before ...Ba5 is to prevent White from inflicting an isolated queen's pawn (IQP) on Black by playing cxd5.

==== Main variation: 7...Nc6 8.a3 Bxc3 9.bxc3 dxc4 10.Bxc4 Qc7 ====
Position: a8 black rook, c8 black bishop, f8 black rook, g8 black king, a7 black pawn, b7 black pawn, c7 black queen, f7 black pawn, g7 black pawn, h7 black pawn, c6 black knight, e6 black pawn, f6 black knight, c5 black pawn, c4 white bishop, d4 white pawn, a3 white pawn, c3 white pawn, e3 white pawn, f3 white knight, f2 white pawn, g2 white pawn, h2 white pawn, a1 white rook, c1 white bishop, d1 white queen, f1 white rook, g1 white king

Main variation: 7.0-0 Nc6 8.a3 Bxc3 9.bxc3 dxc4 10.Bxc4 Qc7

The main variation is defined by 7...Nc6 8.a3 Bxc3 9.bxc3 dxc4 10.Bxc4 Qc7. The variation was enormously popular in the 1950s, but the name has become increasingly inappropriate ever since. This is not because the line is bad for Black – on the contrary, Black equalises in all variations – but because White has a huge selection of moves to choose from, and Black must be familiar with all of them.

White has tried 11.Be2, 11.Bd3, 11.Ba2, 11.Bb2, 11.Bb5 (trying to provoke ...a6 before retreating the bishop), 11.h3, 11.a4, 11.Re1, 11.Qc2, and 11.Qe2. Regardless of the move chosen, however, the basic strategic ideas remain similar: Black will play a quick ...e5 to pressurize d4. If White has a bishop on d3, then Black also threatens ...e4 forking it and the knight on f3. White will try to advance their centre pawns to free their bishops: c4, d5, and f3 followed by e4 are all possible. If Black can prevent White from achieving this, then they will enjoy the better game.

There are several move orders to reach the main variation besides the one given above; 4.e3 0-0 5.Bd3 d5 6.a3 Bxc3+ 7.bxc3 dxc4 8.Bxc4 c5 9.Nf3 Nc6 10.0-0 is one worth noting, because White may try 9.Ne2 instead.

==== Khasin Variation: 7...Nc6 8.a3 Bxc3 9.bxc3 Qc7 ====
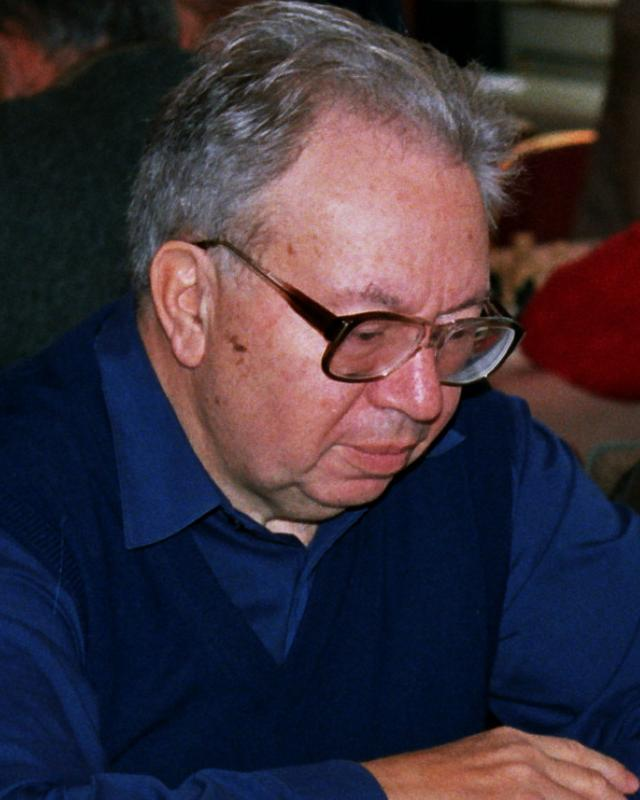
Abram Khasin, 1995

The Khasin Variation, named after International Master Abram Khasin, is defined by 7...Nc6 8.a3 Bxc3 9.bxc3 Qc7. The usual continuation is 10.cxd5 exd5. White will try to build up a strong centre with f3 and e4, or they may play for a kingside attack with f3 and g4. Black will try to restrain White's centre as well as they can, ideally blockading it, before mobilising their queenside pawn majority.

==== Averbakh Variation: 7....Nbd7 ====
The Averbakh Variation (7...Nbd7) was popularized by GMs Viacheslav Ragozin and Yuri Averbakh. The idea is to exchange pawns on c4 and d4 and then bring the d7-knight to b6 and d5. The same knight may also move to f8 to defend the black king. This line has gone out of fashion since the 1960s due to GM Svetozar Gligorić's gambit idea 8.cxd5 exd5 9.a3 Ba5 10.b4! cxb4 11.Nb5! with pressure along the queenside files and a potential square for the knight on d6.

=== 4...0-0: lines with Ne2 ===
In general, the main line of the Rubinstein has held up very well for Black, so since the 1980s White has begun to look elsewhere for chances of obtaining an advantage. In the Rubinstein, White has often resorted to playing Ne2 rather than Nf3 at some point to be able to recapture on c3 with the knight, thus avoiding the doubled pawns. Two lines where White does this (following 4.e3 0-0) are:

5.Ne2 (Reshevsky Variation)
5.Bd3 d5 6.Ne2 (Modern Variation)

==== Reshevsky Variation: 5.Ne2 ====
The Reshevsky Variation (5.Ne2) was a specialty of GM Samuel Reshevsky. White will first play a3 to kick the bishop away, before moving their knight on e2 to a more active square. The main line runs 5.Ne2 d5 6.a3 Be7 7.cxd5, when both 7...exd5 and 7...Nxd5 are possible, the latter move leading to livelier play. GM Mikhail Gurevich is currently the foremost expert in the Reshevsky Variation.

==== Modern Variation: 5.Bd3 d5 6.Ne2 ====
5.Bd3 d5 6.Ne2 and the closely related variant 5.Bd3 d5 6.cxd5 exd5 7.Ne2 were collectively dubbed the Modern Variation by FM Carsten Hansen in his book on the Rubinstein Nimzo-Indian. White again avoids the doubled pawns, but develops the bishop to d3 first so that it isn't blocked in by the knight on e2. Black usually continues 6...c5, putting more pressure on White's centre. While 7.a3 and 7.0-0 are playable, the main line is 7.cxd5 cxd4 8.exd4 Nxd5 9.0-0 Nc6, leading to an IQP position with White's knight on e2 rather than f3, as is normally the case. This gives Black the possibility of playing ...e5 at some point to completely liquidate the centre, although the resulting positions are rather drawish. White's main options on their tenth move are 10.a3, putting the question to the bishop, and 10.Bc2, intending 11.Qd3 with an attack on h7.

=== 4...c5 ===
Position: a8 black rook, b8 black knight, c8 black bishop, d8 black queen, e8 black king, h8 black rook, a7 black pawn, b7 black pawn, d7 black pawn, f7 black pawn, g7 black pawn, h7 black pawn, e6 black pawn, f6 black knight, c5 black pawn, b4 black bishop, c4 white pawn, d4 white pawn, c3 white knight, e3 white pawn, a2 white pawn, b2 white pawn, f2 white pawn, g2 white pawn, h2 white pawn, a1 white rook, c1 white bishop, d1 white queen, e1 white king, f1 white bishop, g1 white knight, h1 white rook

Position after 4.e3 c5

Black puts pressure on d4 and leaves open the option of playing ...d5, or ...d6 and ...e5. The game can still transpose to the main line mentioned above after moves such as 5.Bd3 d5 6.Nf3 0-0 7.0-0, but there are two major variations particular to 4...c5.

==== Hübner Variation: 5.Bd3 Nc6 6.Nf3 ====
The Hübner Variation is defined by 5.Bd3 Nc6 6.Nf3 (6.Ne2 will likely transpose to the Modern Variation) 6...Bxc3+ 7.bxc3 d6. It was popularized by GM Robert Hübner in the late 1960s and '70s and utilised by Bobby Fischer in his world championship match with Boris Spassky in 1972 with great effect in game 5. It is slightly unusual in that Black captures on c3 without waiting for White to play a3, but this is because Black intends to immediately set up a blockade on the dark squares with ...d6 and ...e5. This is feasible because White's knight is on f3; if it were on e2 (as in some lines of the Sämisch), White could quickly advance their kingside pawns, but in the current line the knight must be moved away first. By closing the position, Black is able to make their knights superior to White's bishops, and the doubled c-pawns deprive White of any pawn breaks on the queenside. It was the success of this variation that motivated the current tendency for White players to choose lines where the doubled pawns are avoided. When they do play into this line, White has two main setups to choose from: they may immediately close the centre by playing 8.e4 e5 9.d5 Ne7, or play more flexibly with 8.0-0 e5 9.Nd2 0-0, but Black has full equality in both lines.

==== Rubinstein Variation: 5.Ne2 ====
5.Ne2 is the Rubinstein Variation (this is why 4.e3 is properly referred to as the Rubinstein "system" or "complex" to avoid confusion), which similar in spirit to the Reshevsky Variation: White prevents Black from doubling their pawns. After 5.Ne2, Black opens a path of retreat for their bishop with 5...cxd4 6.exd4, and now chooses between 6...d5 and 6...0-0. 6...d5 allows 7.c5, a typical continuation being 7...Ne4 8.Bd2 Nxd2 9.Qxd2 a5 10.a3 Bxc3 11.Nxc3 a4. White's c4–c5 push created a queenside pawn majority, which Black neutralized by playing ...a7–a5–a4. Black will now try to destroy the rest of White's pawn formation by playing ...b6 or ...e5, while White will try to use a lead in development to create attacking chances on the kingside. The alternative is 6...0-0 7.a3 Be7. Here Kasparov played 8.d5 exd5 9.cxd5 a few times early in his career, increasing his space advantage further but falling behind in development. A safer move for White is 8.Nf4.

=== 4...b6 5.Ne2 ===
Position: a8 black rook, b8 black knight, c8 black bishop, d8 black queen, e8 black king, h8 black rook, a7 black pawn, c7 black pawn, d7 black pawn, f7 black pawn, g7 black pawn, h7 black pawn, b6 black pawn, e6 black pawn, f6 black knight, b4 black bishop, c4 white pawn, d4 white pawn, c3 white knight, e3 white pawn, a2 white pawn, b2 white pawn, e2 white knight, f2 white pawn, g2 white pawn, h2 white pawn, a1 white rook, c1 white bishop, d1 white queen, e1 white king, f1 white bishop, h1 white rook

Position after 4.e3 b6 5.Ne2

Favoured by Nimzowitsch, 4...b6 is a move in accordance with the spirit of the Nimzo-Indian: Black fianchettoes their light-squared bishop to increase their control over e4. White usually continues 5.Ne2, avoiding the doubled pawns, or 5.Bd3, continuing their development (5.Nf3 usually transposes to 5.Bd3). The main variations emerging from these moves are:

5.Ne2 Ba6 (Fischer Variation)
5.Ne2 c5 (Romanishin–Psakhis Variation)
5.Ne2 Ne4 (American Variation)

5.Ne2 Bb7 is a rather passive line; White seems to obtain a slight advantage by continuing 6.a3 Be7 7.d5, blocking in the bishop on b7 and making e3–e4 possible.

==== Fischer Variation: 5...Ba6 ====
The Fischer Variation (5.Ne2 Ba6) aims to exchange light-squared bishops after ...d5 so that Black can play on the light squares. Keres, Bronstein and Smyslov were early contributors to the theory of this line, and Fischer used it several times successfully. White may play 6.a3, which was favoured by Botvinnik and asks the bishop on b4 to clarify its intentions, or 6.Ng3, which was invented by Reshevsky and prepares e4.

==== Romanishin–Psakhis Variation: 5...c5 6.a3 Ba5 ====
5.Ne2 c5 6.a3 Ba5!? was dubbed the Romanishin–Psakhis Variation by Carsten Hansen because Oleg Romanishin and Lev Psakhis were the two grandmasters who were primarily responsible for reviving the line and infusing it with new ideas. It can also arise via the move order 4.e3 c5 5.Ne2 b6 6.a3 Ba5. Black dares White to try and trap the bishop on a5, a challenge White usually takes up, but rarely successfully.

==== American Variation: 5...Ne4 ====
The American Variation is another name invented by Hansen for the line 5.Ne2 Ne4, as it was pioneered by GM Isaac Kashdan and then developed by GM Bisguier, Anthony Santasiere and currently GM Nick de Firmian. Black will exchange off two minor pieces and play ...f5 to keep e4 under control.

=== 4...b6 5.Bd3 Bb7 ===
Position: a8 black rook, b8 black knight, d8 black queen, e8 black king, h8 black rook, a7 black pawn, b7 black bishop, c7 black pawn, d7 black pawn, f7 black pawn, g7 black pawn, h7 black pawn, b6 black pawn, e6 black pawn, f6 black knight, b4 black bishop, c4 white pawn, d4 white pawn, c3 white knight, d3 white bishop, e3 white pawn, f3 white knight, a2 white pawn, b2 white pawn, f2 white pawn, g2 white pawn, h2 white pawn, a1 white rook, c1 white bishop, d1 white queen, e1 white king, h1 white rook

Position after 4.e3 b6 5.Bd3 Bb7 6.Nf3

Unlike 5.Ne2, Black almost always responds with 5...Bb7 if White plays 5.Bd3. Continuations include:

6.Nf3 0-0 7.0-0 d5 (Classical Fianchetto Variation or Tal Variation)
6.Nf3 0-0 7.0-0 c5 (Keres Variation)
6.Nf3 Ne4 (Dutch Variation)

==== Tal Variation: 6.Nf3 0-0 7.0-0 d5 ====
The Classical Fianchetto Variation, also known as the Tal Variation, can be reached through two move orders: 4.e3 b6 5.Bd3 Bb7 6.Nf3 0-0 7.0-0 d5 or 4.e3 0-0 5.Bd3 d5 6.Nf3 b6 7.0-0 Bb7. It is a solid variation where White often holds the initiative early on, but Black usually equalises in the end. White has two ways to attack Black's setup. The first is to play 8.cxd5 exd5 9.Ne5 followed by 10.f4 and transferring the queen or f1-rook to h3 via f3. This formation, known as the Pillsbury Attack, blocks in the dark-squared bishop and appears rather crude, but is actually quite dangerous. Black must create immediate pressure on White's centre by playing ...c5, and ...Ne4 may be a handy move at some point to block the b1–h7 diagonal and perhaps exchange some pieces. The main alternative for White is 8.a3 Bd6 9.cxd5 exd5 10.b4, which gains space on the queenside and makes it harder for Black to free their position with ...c5.

==== Keres Variation: 6.Nf3 0-0 7.0-0 c5 ====
The Keres Variation, characterised by the moves 4.e3 b6 5.Bd3 Bb7 6.Nf3 0-0 7.0-0 c5, is named after Estonian GM Paul Keres, although Smyslov and Bronstein were also early practitioners of this line. If allowed, Black will play ...cxd4 and ...d5 in the hope of leaving White with an isolated queen's pawn. Nowadays, White's most testing continuation is reckoned to be 8.Na4, ducking the exchange on c3 and threatening 9.a3. The knight will often stay on a4 for quite some time to assist in a potential c4–c5 push. After 8...cxd4 9.exd4, Black often sets up a Hedgehog formation (pawns on a6, b6, d6 and e6), while White will try to pursue a strategy of gaining queenside space with b4 and c5.

==== Dutch Variation: 6.Nf3 Ne4 ====
The Dutch Variation is so-called because after 4.e3 b6 5.Bd3 Bb7 6.Nf3 Ne4, Black usually follows up with 7...f5, with a position that resembles the Dutch Defence (1.d4 f5). It is not a very common line, probably because White obtains good chances by playing 7.0-0 f5 8.d5, sacrificing a pawn to open up diagonals for their bishops.

==== Other lines ====
- 6.f3!?
- 6.Ne2?!

=== Botvinnik Variation: 4...d5 5.a3 ===
4...d5 5.a3 leads to the Botvinnik Variation, named after World Champion Mikhail Botvinnik. This forces Black to retreat the bishop to e7 or capture on c3, which transposes to a line of the Sämisch Variation long considered good for White. This is because White will undouble their pawns at some point by playing cxd5, eliminating the weak pawn on c4, then prepare the e4 pawn break, backed by the bishop pair (and in some cases with f3, since they haven't committed the knight to that square yet), which will gain force in the more open type of position which will ensue.

White can avoid entering this line, such as by playing 5.Nf3 or 5.Bd3. This will usually end up transposing to one of the other variations on the page.

=== Taimanov Variation: 4...Nc6 ===
4...Nc6 is the Taimanov Variation, named after Russian GM Mark Taimanov. Black prepares to play ...e5, which may be preceded by...d5 and ...dxc4, or ...d6. The variation was tried several times by the young Bobby Fischer, and has long been favoured by GM Nukhim Rashkovsky.

== Classical Variation: 4.Qc2 ==
Position: a8 black rook, b8 black knight, c8 black bishop, d8 black queen, e8 black king, h8 black rook, a7 black pawn, b7 black pawn, c7 black pawn, d7 black pawn, f7 black pawn, g7 black pawn, h7 black pawn, e6 black pawn, f6 black knight, b4 black bishop, c4 white pawn, d4 white pawn, c3 white knight, a2 white pawn, b2 white pawn, c2 white queen, e2 white pawn, f2 white pawn, g2 white pawn, h2 white pawn, a1 white rook, c1 white bishop, e1 white king, f1 white bishop, g1 white knight, h1 white rook

Position after 4.Qc2

The Classical Variation (or Capablanca Variation) was popular in the early days of the Nimzo-Indian, and though eventually superseded by 4.e3 it was revived in the 1990s; it is now just as popular as the Rubinstein. White aims to acquire the two bishops without compromising their pawn structure. The drawback is that the queen will move at least twice within the opening moves and that White's kingside development is delayed. Thus, even though White possesses the bishop pair, it is usually advisable for Black to open the game quickly to exploit their lead in development. Black has four common replies to 4.Qc2. These include 4...0-0, 4...c5, 4...d5, and 4...Nc6 (4...d6 intending ...Nbd7 and ...e5 is a rarer fifth option).

=== Main line: 4...0-0 ===
4...0-0 is Black's most common reply, where the main line continues 4...0-0 5.a3 Bxc3+ 6.Qxc3. The most common move is then 6...b6. 6...b5!? is a gambit invented by Alvis Vītoliņš. 6...d5 reaches a line also commonly arrived at via the Noa Variation (4...d5). 6...d6 and 6...Ne4 are also seen.

==== 5.a3 Bxc3+ 6.Qxc3 b6 ====
4...0-0 5.a3 Bxc3+ 6.Qxc3 b6 is nowadays the main line of the Classical Variation. After White's move 7.Bg5, Black's usual choice is 7...Bb7, but 7...Ba6 is also possible to target the c-pawn, and 7...h6 8.Bh4 c5 and 7...c5 are sometimes played as well.

After 7.Bg5 Bb7, White's most straightforward move is 8.f3 preparing e4, but Black can counter with 8...h6 9.Bh4 d5, when the pawn grab 10.cxd5 exd5 11.Bxf6 Qxf6 12.Qxc7 Ba6 is very dangerous for White because of Black's better development. Therefore, White has sometimes tried 8.e3 instead, when after 8...h6 9.Bh4 d5?! 10.cxd5 exd5? 11.Bxf6 Qxf6 12.Qxc7 Ba6 White has 13.Bxa6 Nxa6 14.Qb7. Thus Black should prefer 8.e3 d6, planning ...Nbd7 and ...c5.

Instead of 7.Bg5, White can play 7.Nf3 Bb7 8.e3, intending to develop the dark-squared bishop to b2.

==== 5.e4 ====
Position: a8 black rook, b8 black knight, c8 black bishop, d8 black queen, f8 black rook, g8 black king, a7 black pawn, b7 black pawn, c7 black pawn, f7 black pawn, g7 black pawn, h7 black pawn, e6 black pawn, d5 black pawn, e5 white pawn, b4 black bishop, c4 white pawn, d4 white pawn, e4 black knight, c3 white knight, a2 white pawn, b2 white pawn, c2 white queen, f2 white pawn, g2 white pawn, h2 white pawn, a1 white rook, c1 white bishop, e1 white king, f1 white bishop, g1 white knight, h1 white rook

4.Qc2 0-0 5.e4 d5 6.e5 Ne4

An alternative for White is 5.e4, although this is somewhat inconsistent with 4.Qc2 as Black might be able to double White's c-pawns at some point (the queen must guard e4), something 4.Qc2 was supposed to prevent.

A highly theoretical line can follow, continuing 5...d5 6.e5 Ne4 7.Bd3 c5 8.Nf3 (or 8.Ne2) cxd4 9.Nxd4 Nd7 10.Bf4 Qh4 (or 10...Ndc5 11.0-0) 11.g3 Qh5 (or 11...Qh3) 12.0-0 g5 13.cxd5. 5...d6 is also a possibility, though less common.

==== Other lines ====
- After 5.a3 Bxc3+ 6.Qxc3, Black can try 6...Ne4, with the typical continuation, 7.Qc2 f5, which is similar to the Dutch Variation, but without the doubled pawns for White.

=== 4...c5 ===
4...c5 exploits the fact that on c2, the queen no longer defends the d-pawn. If White defends the pawn, then Black gets an easy game by keeping the pressure on d4, so White almost always plays 5.dxc5. Black can choose to recapture on c5 with the bishop (e.g. 5...Bxc5 or 5...0-0 6.a3 Bxc5), or with the knight (after 5...Na6 or 5...0-0 6.Nf3 Na6). In the former case, the bishop will eventually retreat to e7 and Black will set up a Hedgehog formation (pawns on a6, b6, d6 and e6). If Black recaptures with the knight, they will often have to give up the bishop pair at some point with ...Bxc3, but the knight is useful on c5 and can later go to e4, attacking the queen on c3.

==== Pirc Variation: 5.dxc5 0-0 ====
4...c5 5.dxc5 0-0, known as the Pirc Variation, was one of the reasons why 4.Qc2 was not popular during the mid-20th century, because the lines where Black eventually recaptures with the knight was reckoned to give Black easy equality, while the line which prevented this maneuver, 6.a3 Bxc5 7.Nf3 Nc6 8.Bg5 Nd4 9.Nxd4 Bxd4 10.e3 Qa5 11.exd4 Qxg5, left the Black queen active, while White still needs to secure the king.

The discovery of 12.Qd2! revived this line for White after it was discovered that the endgame after 12...Qxd2+ 13.Kxd2 offers White a slight edge. Indeed, Edmar Mednis's remark was that the entire Pirc Variation had become unplayable at the highest level, while Modern Chess Openings (MCO) cites this variation as the main problem with 4...c5. However, players like Kramnik have been willing to defend the Black side of this line against players like Kasparov.

=== 4...d5 ===
4...d5 is another move that strikes immediately in the centre, and was frequently played by Mikhail Botvinnik. After 5.cxd5, Black can either recapture with the queen or pawn. After 5.a3, the variation typically continues 5...Bxc3+ 6.Qxc3 followed by either 6...0-0, transposing to the main line with 4...0-0 5.a3, or 6...Ne4, among others.

==== Main line: 5.a3 Bxc3+ 6.Qxc3 Ne4 ====
After 6.Qxc3 Ne4, White usually responds with 7.Qc2, where Black may play 7...c5 or 7...Nc6 intending ...e5. Even though White possesses the pair of bishops, Black still strives for a quick opening of the position to exploit a lead in development. The usual result of this is a dynamically balanced position.

==== 5.cxd5 ====
After 5.cxd5, Black can either recapture with the queen or pawn. 5...Qxd5 is the Romanishin System named after Oleg Romanishin: the idea is that after 6.Nf3 Qf5 7.Qxf5 exf5, Black strengthens his grip on e4 and makes e6 available for the bishop, which is enough for him to obtain equality. White can avoid this with 6.e3 so that 6...Qf5 can be met with 7.Bd3, but the e3-pawn blocks in White's c1-bishop. The older alternative is 5...exd5 6.Bg5 h6, which tends to be a rather sharp line.

=== Zürich Variation: 4...Nc6 ===
4...Nc6 is the Zürich Variation (or Milner-Barry Variation, after British chess player Stuart Milner-Barry). Black gives up the dark-squared bishop, but places their central pawns on d6 and e5 so that their remaining bishop is unimpeded. To avoid moving the queen, White will play Bd2 at some point so that when Black takes the knight, White can recapture with the bishop.

4...Nc6 is out of fashion because most players prefer to avoid blocking their c-pawn. A topical line would go 1.d4 Nf6 2.c4 e6 3.Nc3 Bb4 4.Qc2 Nc6 5.Nf3 (better than 5.e3) d6, with the idea of playing e5. Black often prepares this with castling and ...Re8 or by playing Qe7. After Black plays ...e5, White usually responds with d5. Black is willing to lose a tempo moving the knight back to b8 (or e7, which is often better) because the position is closed.

White usually plays on the queenside in this variation, while Black will try to play on the kingside with ...f5 and possibly transferring the c6-knight over to the kingside after White's d5. Today, the line arises quite often by transposition from the Black Knights Tango, e.g. 1.d4 Nf6 2.c4 Nc6 3.Nf3 e6 4.Nc3 Bb4 5.Qc2.

== Kasparov Variation: 4.Nf3 ==
Position: a8 black rook, b8 black knight, c8 black bishop, d8 black queen, e8 black king, h8 black rook, a7 black pawn, b7 black pawn, c7 black pawn, d7 black pawn, f7 black pawn, g7 black pawn, h7 black pawn, e6 black pawn, f6 black knight, b4 black bishop, c4 white pawn, d4 white pawn, c3 white knight, f3 white knight, a2 white pawn, b2 white pawn, e2 white pawn, f2 white pawn, g2 white pawn, h2 white pawn, a1 white rook, c1 white bishop, d1 white queen, e1 white king, f1 white bishop, h1 white rook

Kasparov Variation: 4.Nf3

4.Nf3 is known as the Kasparov Variation, since Garry Kasparov used it to great effect against Anatoly Karpov in their 1985 World Championship match. Kasparov played 4.Nf3 six times, scoring three wins and three draws. White develops the knight to a natural square and waits to see Black's reply. Today as White, this is a favourite weapon of GM Alexei Barsov and former Women's Champion Nona Gaprindashvili. It is also sometimes known as the purely descriptive Three Knights Variation.

Black can play 4...d5 to transpose to the Ragozin Defence of the Queen's Gambit Declined. Alternatively, 4...b6 5.Bg5 Bb7 transposes to the Nimzo/Queen's Indian hybrid line, so 4...c5 (or 4...0-0) is the most common move that stays within Nimzo-Indian territory. Now 5.e3 transposes to the Rubinstein System, but the main move is 5.g3, which leads to a position that also arises from the Fianchetto Variation. 5.g3 cxd4 6.Nxd4 0-0 7.Bg2 d5 8.cxd5 Nxd5 can be considered the main line. Black has dissolved White's centre, but the bishop on g2 exerts pressure on the black queenside, which White may augment with 9.Qb3.

This line can also arise from the Bogo-Indian Defence (1.d4 Nf6 2.c4 e6 3.Nf3 Bb4+) if White blocks the check with 4.Nc3.

== Sämisch Variation: 4.a3 ==
Position: a8 black rook, b8 black knight, c8 black bishop, d8 black queen, e8 black king, h8 black rook, a7 black pawn, b7 black pawn, c7 black pawn, d7 black pawn, f7 black pawn, g7 black pawn, h7 black pawn, e6 black pawn, f6 black knight, c4 white pawn, d4 white pawn, a3 white pawn, c3 white pawn, e2 white pawn, f2 white pawn, g2 white pawn, h2 white pawn, a1 white rook, c1 white bishop, d1 white queen, e1 white king, f1 white bishop, g1 white knight, h1 white rook

Sämisch Variation: 4.a3 Bxc3 5.bxc3

4.a3 is known as the Sämisch Variation, after Fritz Sämisch. It is a direct attempt to refute Black's strategic concept, as White gives up a tempo and concedes doubled c-pawns to gain the bishop pair. After 4...Bxc3+ 5.bxc3, Black has several possibilities, the most common of which is to blockade the doubled pawns with 5....c5. Black will proceed to attack the pawn on c4 with the moves ...b6, ...Ba6, ...Nc6–a5 and ...Rc8. As compensation, White establishes a powerful centre, which may provide a basis for a quick kingside attack.

The Sämisch Variation was employed five times by Mikhail Botvinnik against Tal in the 1960 World Chess Championship, with five draws resulting, and once in the 1961 rematch, with a win for White. Subsequent practice has shown that White ultimately has difficulty obtaining enough kingside play to compensate for the doubled c-pawns, so this variation is rarely seen nowadays. Instead of 5...c5, 5...d5 is also possible, and transposes to the Botvinnik Variation if White plays 6.e3.

== Other variations ==
- 4.f3 – This line has no generally accepted name, so is usually just referred to as the 4.f3 Variation. It has previously been called the Gheorghiu Variation (a name given by Gligorić), named after Florin Gheorghiu who often played it early in his career, even defeating Fischer, sometimes the Shirov Variation, after Alexei Shirov who used it with great success in the early 1990s, before he lost three consecutive games with the line and abandoned it. It's also called the Kmoch Variation. It is a straightforward attempt to seize control of e4 at the cost of delaying development. Black's most common responses are 4...d5 and 4...c5. After 4...d5, the most common continuation 5.a3 Bxc3+ 6.bxc3 c5 7.cxd5 Nxd5, a position also reached from the Sämisch Variation. Black's pressure on c3 and d4 compels White to play 8.dxc5, trying to open the position for their two bishops. White will follow up with e4, and Black will counter with ...e5 at some point to prevent White from pushing their e- and f-pawns further up the board. Another approach for Black is to play 4...c5, after which White's most common move is 5.d5 to reach a Benoni-style position, and Black's main replies are 5...b5, 5...0-0, 5...Bxc3+ and 5...Nh5. Instead of 5.d5, 5.a3 Bxc3+ 6.bxc3 is a direct transposition to the Sämisch Variation below.
- 4.Bg5 – The Leningrad Variation received its name because its theory was developed extensively by players from that city, such as Boris Spassky. Black can play 4...h6 or the immediate 4...c5. After 4...h6, the game may go 5.Bh4 c5 6.d5. Here the main line is 6...d6 7.e3 Bxc3+ 8.bxc3 e5, when Black has achieved a Hübner Variation-like blockade, the difference being that White's dark-squared bishop is outside the pawn chain. The pin on the f6-knight is very annoying, and Black often breaks it by playing the drastic ...g7–g5, which also clamps down on a potential f2–f4 break by White. This move weakens Black's kingside, so rather than castle on that side, Black usually safeguards the king by playing ...Kd8-c7. An alternative to 6...d6 or 6...Bxc3+ is 6...b5, much played in the 1970s after Mikhail Tal scored a crushing win over Spassky at Tallinn 1973.
- 4.g3 – The Romanishin Variation or Fianchetto Variation resembles the Catalan System, where White fianchettoes the king's bishop to control the central light squares. Black can play 4...c5 5.Nf3 with a position also reached from the Kasparov Variation (see above), but 4...d5 is possible as well. This is considered the strongest response, since Black can often take and keep the pawn on c4. This is not usually possible in the Catalan, where White's queen's knight can be developed to d2 rather than c3 and can then recapture on c4.
- 4.Qb3 – The Spielmann Variation is named after Rudolf Spielmann who played it at Carlsbad, 1929, and was played at master level in the early 1930s, though soon eclipsed in popularity by 4.Qc2. Like the Classical Variation 4.Qc2, it avoids the doubling of White's pawns. Unlike 4.Qc2, the queen on b3 has no control over e4, which Black can exploit, e.g., by playing 4...c5 5.dxc5 Nc6 6.Nf3 Ne4. Thus, despite the occasional revival by GMs Vladimir Akopian, Vladimir Malaniuk and Jeroen Piket, this variation remains uncommon.
- 4.Bd2 – This move is relatively unambitious, simply unpinning the knight. The strategic aim of obtaining the bishop pair without conceding the doubled pawns fails, for after e.g., 4...Bxc3 5.Bxc3 Ne4, White cannot retain both bishops, and trades are usually not in White's interest since White has an advantage in space. However, it has recently become more popular at the top level as a way to avoid deeply analysed variations.
- 4.Qd3 – The Mikenas Variation is named after Vladas Mikėnas. It supports the knight and brings the queen to a central location, but the queen is exposed on d3, making this variation rare.
- 4.e4 – The Dilworth Gambit, named for Vernon Dilworth, who contributed an article on the variation to the March 1949 issue of CHESS magazine. Dilworth's idea was 4...Nxe4 5.Qg4 Nxc3 6.Bd2, but this does not give White compensation for the pawn. The line accordingly never developed a following beyond Dilworth himself. Chris Ward called the gambit "critical, but basically rubbish".
- 4.Nh3 - This move is very rarely played, and is essentially a waiting move.

== ECO codes ==
In the Encyclopaedia of Chess Openings, the Nimzo-Indian Defence has codes E20 to E59. All codes begin with 1.d4 Nf6 2.c4 e6 3.Nc3 Bb4, excluding E20, which also includes alternatives to 3...Bb4 apart from 3...d5 (which would be the Queen's Gambit Declined).

E20 – 1.d4 Nf6 2.c4 e6 3.Nc3 (includes 4.g3 Romanishin Variation, 4.f3 Variation of Nimzo-Indian excluding 4.f3 d5 5.a3 Bxc3+, which is covered under E25)
E21 – 1.d4 Nf6 2.c4 e6 3.Nc3 Bb4 4.Nf3 (Kasparov Variation excluding 4...c5 5.g3, which is covered under E20)
E22 – 4.Qb3 (E22 and E23 cover the Spielmann Variation)
E23 – 4.Qb3 c5
E24 – 4.a3 (E24–E29 cover the Sämisch Variation)
E25 – 4.a3 Bxc3+ 5.bxc3 c5
E26 – 4.a3 Bxc3+ 5.bxc3 c5 6.e3
E27 – 4.a3 Bxc3+ 5.bxc3 0-0
E28 – 4.a3 Bxc3+ 5.bxc3 0-0 6.e3
E29 – 4.a3 Bxc3+ 5.bxc3 0-0 6.e3 c5
E30 – 4.Bg5 (E30 and E31 cover the Leningrad Variation)
E31 – 4.Bg5 h6 6.Bh4 c5 6.d5 d6
E32 – 4.Qc2 (includes 4...0-0; E32–E39 cover the Classical/Capablanca Variation)
E33 – 4.Qc2 Nc6 (Zürich/Milner-Barry Variation)
E34 – 4.Qc2 d5
E35 – 4.Qc2 d5 5.cxd5 exd5
E36 – 4.Qc2 d5 5.a3
E37 – 4.Qc2 d5 5.a3 Bxc3+ 6.Qxc3 Ne4
E38 – 4.Qc2 c5
E39 – 4.Qc2 c5 5.dxc5 0-0
E40 – 4.e3 (includes Taimanov Variation; E40–E59 cover the Rubinstein System)
E41 – 4.e3 c5 (includes Hübner Variation)
E42 – 4.e3 c5 5.Ne2 (Rubinstein Variation, Romanishin–Psakhis Variation via 5...b6 6.a3 Ba5)
E43 – 4.e3 b6 (includes Dutch Variation, Keres Variation)
E44 – 4.e3 b6 5.Ne2 (includes American Variation, 5...Bb7 Variation)
E45 – 4.e3 b6 5.Ne2 Ba6 (Fischer Variation)
E46 – 4.e3 0-0 (includes Reshevsky Variation)
E47 – 4.e3 0-0 5.Bd3
E48 – 4.e3 0-0 5.Bd3 d5 (includes Modern Variation)
E49 – 4.e3 0-0 5.Bd3 d5 6.a3
E50 – 4.e3 0-0 5.Nf3
E51 – 4.e3 0-0 5.Nf3 d5
E52 – 4.e3 0-0 5.Nf3 d5 6.Bd3 b6 (Classical Fianchetto/Tal Variation)
E53 – 4.e3 0-0 5.Nf3 d5 6.Bd3 c5 (includes Averbakh Variation)
E54 – 4.e3 0-0 5.Nf3 d5 6.Bd3 c5 7.0-0 dxc4 8.Bxc4 (includes Karpov Variation, Bronstein Variation, Smyslov Variation)
E55 – 4.e3 0-0 5.Nf3 d5 6.Bd3 c5 7.0-0 dxc4 8.Bxc4 Nbd7 (Parma Variation)
E56 – 4.e3 0-0 5.Nf3 d5 6.Bd3 c5 7.0-0 Nc6 (includes Larsen Variation)
E57 – 4.e3 0-0 5.Nf3 d5 6.Bd3 c5 7.0-0 Nc6 8.a3 dxc4 9.Bxc4 cxd4
E58 – 4.e3 0-0 5.Nf3 d5 6.Bd3 c5 7.0-0 Nc6 8.a3 Bxc3 9.bxc3 (includes Khasin Variation)
E59 – 4.e3 0-0 5.Nf3 d5 6.Bd3 c5 7.0-0 Nc6 8.a3 Bxc3 9.bxc3 dxc4 10.Bxc4 (includes main variation)

== See also ==
- List of chess openings
- List of chess openings named after people
