= James Sherwin =

American chess player and business executive (born 1933)

James Terry Sherwin
Personal information
- Born: October 25, 1933 (age 92) New York City, U.S.

Chess career
- Country: United States (until 2025); England (since 2025)
- Title: International Master (1958)
- Peak rating: 2375 (January 1982)

James Terry Sherwin (born October 25, 1933) is an American-English corporate executive and International Master in chess.

== Early life ==
Born in New York City in 1933, Sherwin attended Stuyvesant High School, Columbia College (Phi Beta Kappa) and Columbia Law School.

== Corporate career ==
Sherwin graduated from the U.S. Coast Guard Academy Officer Candidate School in 1956 and later became a lieutenant commander. He is an attorney admitted to the New York and Supreme Court Bars. He joined GAF Corporation in 1960 serving in various legal and operational roles and eventually becoming its chief financial officer. He was CFO at Triangle Industries from 1983 to 1984, rejoining GAF Corporation as vice chairman from 1985 to 1990.

While at GAF, in 1988, he was indicted by the US Attorney for the Southern District of New York, Rudolph Giuliani, for stock manipulation in connection with the 1986 sale of stock owned by GAF. He was convicted after three trials, but the conviction was reversed on appeal and dismissed with prejudice.

In 1991 he was appointed executive vice president and chief financial officer of Hunter Douglas N.V., a Dutch multinational company, in which capacity he served until 1999 and was a director and adviser to Hunter Douglas until June 2021. He has been a director of Tempo Global Resources, LLC, a metals trading company, since 2019.

He is an overseer of the International Rescue Committee and member of the Association of the Bar of the City of New York. He received an Honorary Doctor of Laws Degree from the University of Bath in December, 2007.

== Chess career ==
Sherwin finished third and tied for third in the US Chess Championship twice and tied for fourth four times. He was Intercollegiate Champion and New York State Champion in 1951 and US Speed Champion in 1956–57 and 1959–60. He earned the International Master title in 1958. He played in the Portorož Interzonal in 1958, which was part of the 1960 World Championship cycle. While he finished only 17th out of 21 players, he scored (+2–2=2) against the six players who qualified from the tournament to the Candidates tournament at Bled 1959.

He is a previous President of the American Chess Foundation. He was inducted into the US Chess Hall of Fame in 2021. World Champion Bobby Fischer included a game played between Fischer and Sherwin at the 1957 New Jersey Open Championship in his famous book My 60 Memorable Games.

== Personal life ==
Sherwin resides with his wife, Hiroko, near Bath, England.
