= World Chess Championship 1961 =

| | Defending champion | Challenger |
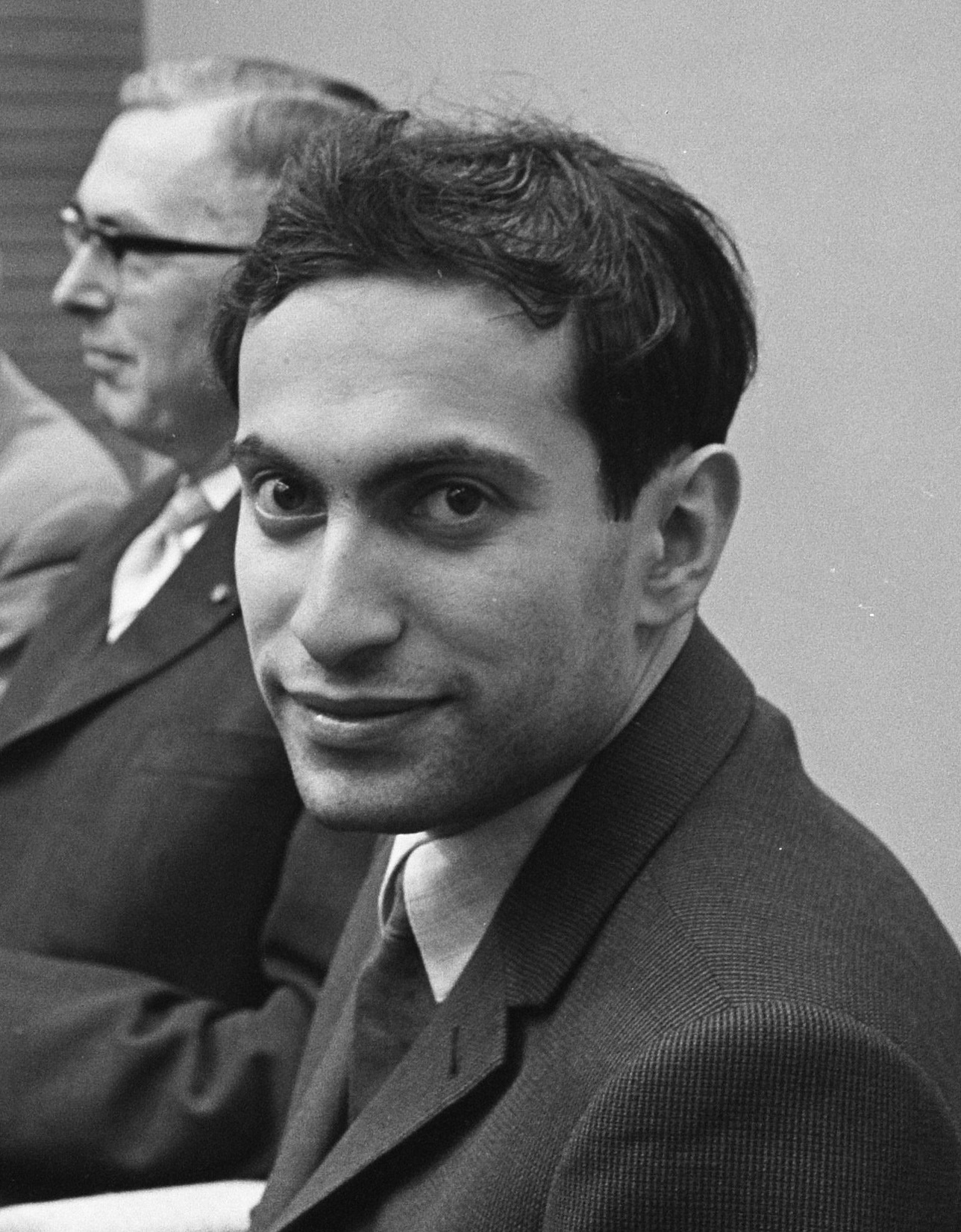
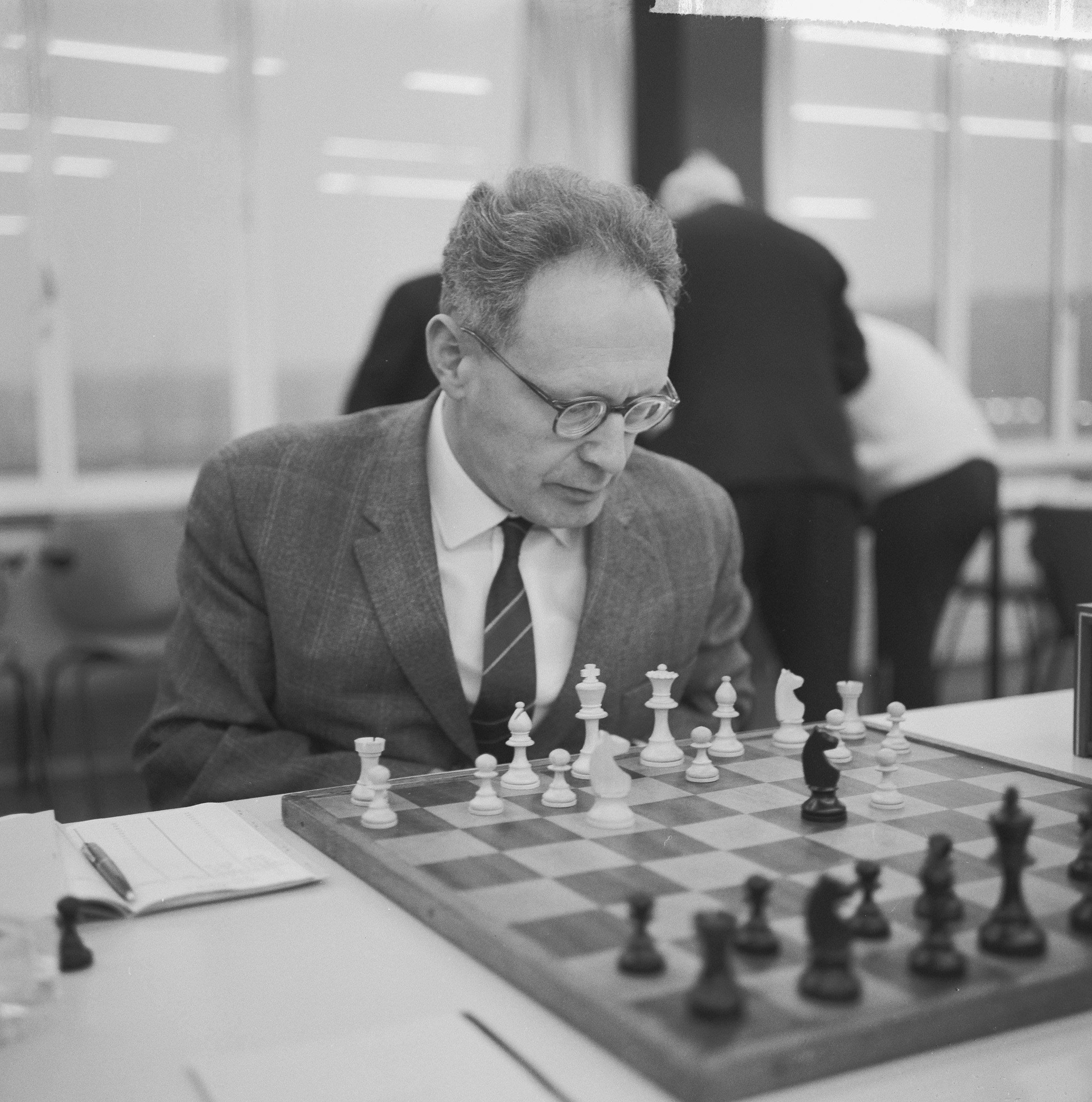
| | Mikhail Tal | Mikhail Botvinnik |
| | (Soviet Union) Mikhail Tal | (Soviet Union) Mikhail Botvinnik |
| 8 | Scores | 13 |
| | Born 9 November 1936; 24 years old | Born 17 August 1911; 49 years old |
| | Winner of the 1960 World Chess Championship | Former world champion |

A World Chess Championship was played between former champion Mikhail Botvinnik and champion Mikhail Tal in Moscow from March 15 to May 13, 1961. Tal had unseated Botvinnik in the 1960 match; thus, Botvinnik was entitled to this rematch the next year. Tal was considered a strong favourite due to his heavy win the previous year, and being 25 years younger.

Botvinnik won convincingly, by a 13–8 margin, regaining the world title. Although Tal suffered kidney illness in 1962, there was no hint of it at the time, and commentators put the victory down to Botvinnik playing a superior strategy, and being able to combat Tal's attacking style. In 2002, however, Yuri Averbakh revealed that Tal was having health issues, and his doctors in Riga advised that he should postpone the match for health reasons. When Botvinnik would agree to a postponement only if Tal was certified unfit by Moscow doctors, Tal decided to play, thinking he would win anyway.

The win made Botvinnik the first (and only) person to have three separate reigns as World Champion. At 49 years of age, it also makes him (as of 2025) the oldest player to win a World Championship match since 1892 (when 55-year-old Wilhelm Steinitz prevailed over Mikhail Chigorin).

== Results ==
The match was played as best of 24 games. If it ended 12–12, Tal, the title holder, would retain the Championship.

World Chess Championship Match 1961
| | 1 | 2 | 3 | 4 | 5 | 6 | 7 | 8 | 9 | 10 | 11 | 12 | 13 | 14 | 15 | 16 | 17 | 18 | 19 | 20 | 21 | Points |
|---|---|---|---|---|---|---|---|---|---|---|---|---|---|---|---|---|---|---|---|---|---|---|
| Mikhail Botvinnik (Soviet Union) | 1 | 0 | 1 | ½ | ½ | ½ | 1 | 0 | 1 | 1 | 1 | 0 | 1 | ½ | 1 | ½ | 0 | 1 | 0 | ½ | 1 | 13 |
| Mikhail Tal (Soviet Union) | 0 | 1 | 0 | ½ | ½ | ½ | 0 | 1 | 0 | 0 | 0 | 1 | 0 | ½ | 0 | ½ | 1 | 0 | 1 | ½ | 0 | 8 |

== See also ==
- World Chess Championship 1960
