= Ruy Lopez, Zaitsev Variation =

Chess opening

Zaitsev Defence
Position: a8 black rook, d8 black queen, f8 black rook, g8 black king, b7 black bishop, c7 black pawn, e7 black bishop, f7 black pawn, g7 black pawn, h7 black pawn, a6 black pawn, c6 black knight, d6 black pawn, f6 black knight, b5 black pawn, e5 black pawn, e4 white pawn, b3 white bishop, c3 white pawn, f3 white knight, h3 white pawn, a2 white pawn, b2 white pawn, d2 white pawn, f2 white pawn, g2 white pawn, a1 white rook, b1 white knight, c1 white bishop, d1 white queen, e1 white rook, g1 white king
- Moves: 1.e4 e5 2.Nf3 Nc6 3.Bb5 a6 4.Ba4 Nf6 5.0-0 Be7 6.Re1 b5 7.Bb3 d6 8.c3 0-0 9.h3 Bb7
- ECO: C92
- Named after: Igor Zaitsev
- Parent: Ruy Lopez
- Synonym: Flohr–Zaitsev Variation

The Zaitsev Variation of the Ruy Lopez, also known as the Flohr–Zaitsev Variation, is a chess opening that begins with the moves:

1. e4 e5
2. Nf3 Nc6
3. Bb5 a6
4. Ba4 Nf6
5. 0-0 Be7
6. Re1 b5
7. Bb3 d6
8. c3 O-O
9. h3 Bb7

The main line of the Ruy Lopez is 3...a6 4.Ba4 Nf6 5.0-0. The most common move after this is the solid developing move 5...Be7, which enters the Closed Defence, avoiding alternatives such as the sharp Open Defence, 5...Nxe4. The traditional continuation, and still narrowly the most frequently seen, is 6.Re1 b5 7.Bb3 d6 8.c3 0-0 9.h3 (or 7...0-0 8.c3 d6 9.h3, or 7...0-0 8.h3 d6 9.c3), avoiding further sharp lines such as the Marshall Attack. The Zaitsev Variation begins with 9...Bb7.

The variation was advocated by Igor Zaitsev, who was one of grandmaster Anatoly Karpov's trainers for many years. Frequently played by Karpov, the Zaitsev remains one of the most important variations of the Ruy Lopez. With 9...Bb7 Black prepares to put more pressure on e4 following 10.d4 Re8. One drawback of this line is that White can force a draw by repetition with 11.Ng5 Rf8 12.Nf3.

== Main line: 10.d4 Re8 11.Nbd2 Bf8 ==
Position: a8 black rook, d8 black queen, e8 black rook, f8 black bishop, g8 black king, b7 black bishop, c7 black pawn, f7 black pawn, g7 black pawn, h7 black pawn, a6 black pawn, c6 black knight, d6 black pawn, f6 black knight, b5 black pawn, e5 black pawn, d4 white pawn, e4 white pawn, b3 white bishop, c3 white pawn, f3 white knight, h3 white pawn, a2 white pawn, b2 white pawn, d2 white knight, f2 white pawn, g2 white pawn, a1 white rook, c1 white bishop, d1 white queen, e1 white rook, g1 white king

Main line: 10.d4 Re8 11.Nbd2 Bf8

After 10.d4 Re8, taking space in the centre and developing, the usual continuation is 11.Nbd2, though 11.a3, 11.a4, and 11.Ng5 (the drawing line) are also seen. Black almost always replies to 11.Nbd2 with the retreat 11...Bf8. Here, White has 12.a4 (the main move), 12.d5, 12.Bc2 and 12.a3 (12.Nf1? loses a pawn after 12...exd4 13.cxd4 Na5 14.Bc2 Nxe4, where White has insufficient compensation).

=== 12.a4 line ===
With 12.a4, White pressures Black's queenside. Black usually continues with 12...h6, but the sidelines 12...Na5 and 12...Qd7 have also been tried. 12...exd4 transposes into the main line after 13.cxd4 h6 14.Bc2.

12...h6 is the main line. Play continues 13.Bc2 (13.d5 is a sideline, after 13...Nb8 Black is doing well) exd4 14.cxd4 Nb4 15.Bb1 c5 16.d5 Nd7 17.Ra3 (planning to transfer the rook to e3, f3 or g3) c4 (17...f5 is a sharp but risky alternative) 18.axb5 axb5 19.Nd4 Rxa3 20.bxa3 Nd3 21.Bxd3 cxd3 22.Re3 Nc5 23.Bb2 Qa5 24.Nf5 g6 25.Ng3, and theory ends. In this position, it is not clear if White has an advantage. Black has the bishop pair and a passed pawn on d3. This is why alternatives to 12.a4 are being played more recently.

12...Na5 plans to induce a structural weakness on White's queenside. Play continues 13.Bc2 exd4 (13...c5 is natural but less accurate, because after 14.d5 Black's bishop on b7 is weak.) 14.cxd4 b4 15.b3 and now 15...g6. White has a slight advantage but Black has counterplay in the form of queenside pressure.

12...Qd7 has been favoured by Karpov, who played this move against Kasparov in the World Chess Championship 1984 and World Chess Championship 1985.

=== 12.a3 line ===
Another option after 11...Bf8 is 12.a3. With a3, White controls the b4-square further, preventing Nc6–Nb4 ideas, and freeing up the a2-square for the light-squared bishop. Black has two options, 12...h6 or the sideline 12...g6, which plans to fianchetto the bishop, but gives White an advantage after 13.Ba2 Bg7 14.b4, where White has a space advantage and locks down the queenside. After 12...h6, play usually continues with 13.Bc2 Nb8. White can then choose between 14.b3 and 14.b4. 14.b4 increases control over c5. Play continues 14...Nbd7 15.Bb2, where Black has 15...g6 and 15...c5. The latter is less popular; after 16.bxc5 exd4 17.cxd4 dxc5 18.d5 c4, Black's position is objectively fine but harder to play from a practical standpoint compared to White's position. Therefore, Black more commonly plays 15...g6. White continues 16.Qb1, where Black continues with either 16...Bg7, where theory continues 17.Nb3 Rc8 18.Na5 Ba8 19.d5 or 16...Rb8 (planning to immediately play Ba8 in anticipation of Nb3–Na5), where play continues 17.Nb3 Ba8 18.Na5 c5 19.d5 c4.

=== Traditional line: 12.Bc2 ===
The old continuation is 12.Bc2. White wants to fortify the e-pawn, which is under pressure, and aim for a setup with d5, followed by c4, b3 forming a pawn chain, then Be3 followed by Nf1. White always immediately responds to Rec8 (or Rac8) with Rc1. Black aims to pressure White's queenside with moves like Nc6–b8–d7 (like in the Breyer), Qc7, Rac8, c7–c6, a6–a5. White aims to attack Black's kingside, Black on the other hand wants to attack White's queenside. Black often plays g6, but does not fianchetto the bishop because controlling the a3–f8 diagonal is crucial as the d-pawn is weak in this variation as Black has played c7–c6; for example, 12...g6 13.d5 Nb8 14.b3 Nbd7 15.c4 c6 16.Nf1 Qc7 17.Be3 Rec8 18.Rc1 a5 19.Ng3 and 19...Bg7? loses a pawn after 20.dxc6 Bxc6 21.cxb5 Bxb5 22.Bd3 Qb7 23.Rxc8+ Rxc8 24.Bxb5 Qxb5 25.Qxd6.

=== Pawn advance line: 12.d5 ===
White can also play 12.d5 to exchange the d-pawn with Black's c-pawn, leading to a more open game. The main continuation is 12...Nb8 13.Nf1 Nbd7. White can play the forcing 14.N3h2, which continues 14...Nc5 15.Bc2 c6 16.b4 Ncd7 17.dxc6 Bxc6 18.Bg5 h6 19.Bxf6 Nxf6 20.Ng4 Nxg4 21.Qxg4, where Black has the bishop pair, but the quality of Black's pieces are worse. Another option for White is 14.Ng3, keeping more pieces on the board, where play continues 14...Nc5 15.Bc2 c6 16.b4 Ncd7 17.dxc6 Bxc6 18.Bb3 (Ng5 is threatened) h6. White's pieces are more active but has weak pawns on e4 and c3.

== Black's tenth-move alternatives ==
- 10...Nd7 may transpose to the Karpov Variation.
- 10...h6 may transpose to the Smyslov Variation.

== White's tenth-move alternatives ==
- 10.d3 is occasionally seen and leads to a quieter game than 10.d4.
- 10.a4 is a rarely seen possibility. Transposition to the 8.a4 Anti-Marshall is possible.

== See also ==
- List of chess openings
- List of chess openings named after people
