= King's Indian Defence, Sämisch Variation =

Sämisch Variation
Position: a8 black rook, b8 black knight, c8 black bishop, d8 black queen, e8 black king, h8 black rook, a7 black pawn, b7 black pawn, c7 black pawn, e7 black pawn, f7 black pawn, g7 black bishop, h7 black pawn, d6 black pawn, f6 black knight, g6 black pawn, c4 white pawn, d4 white pawn, e4 white pawn, c3 white knight, f3 white pawn, a2 white pawn, b2 white pawn, g2 white pawn, h2 white pawn, a1 white rook, c1 white bishop, d1 white queen, e1 white king, f1 white bishop, g1 white knight, h1 white rook
- Moves: 1.d4 Nf6 2.c4 g6 3.Nc3 Bg7 4.e4 d6 5.f3
- ECO: E80–E89
- Named after: Friedrich Sämisch
- Parent: King's Indian Defence

The Sämisch Variation of the King's Indian Defence is a chess opening that begins with the moves:

1. d4 Nf6
2. c4 g6
3. Nc3 Bg7
4. e4 d6
5. f3

The Sämisch is a subtle blockading system and a critical challenge to the King's Indian. It is named after the German grandmaster Friedrich Sämisch. The Sämisch has been played by numerous grandmasters, including world champions Mikhail Botvinnik, Mikhail Tal, Tigran Petrosian, Boris Spassky, Anatoly Karpov, and Garry Kasparov.

Bobby Fischer had trouble against the Sämisch. Mednis' How to Beat Bobby Fischer showed that five of Fischer's losses were against the Sämisch King's Indian, and remarked that Fischer eventually avoided the King's Indian if he believed he would face the Sämisch; however, Fischer faced the Sämisch five times against Spassky in their 1992 rematch—winning two, drawing two, and losing one.

In the Encyclopaedia of Chess Openings, the Sämisch Variation is covered in chapters E80 to E89.

== Strategic ideas ==
By playing 5.f3, White postpones the development of the kingside pieces in order to solidify the centre. The pawn on f3 also prevents Black from using the g4-square, while potentially setting up g4–g5 or h4 and kingside play for White. Compared to the classical King's Indian lines where White plays Nf3, the Sämisch allows relatively little counterplay for Black on the kingside and grants chances for a kingside initiative. The classical plan for White is to castle queenside and attack on the kingside by advancing the g- and h-pawns. The Sämisch has therefore been noted as a good line for aggressive attacking players. A drawback to White's plan is that the pawn on f3 deprives the g1-knight of its most natural square, a point summarised by Eduard Gufeld: "Ask the king's knight what it thinks of 5.f3." (Gufeld's favourite victory was a win with black over Vladimir Bagirov against the Sämisch.)

The strategic nature of the battle in the centre is largely up to Black, who can challenge the centre with the pawn advances ...c5 or ...e5, then White needs to decide whether to close the centre with d4–d5, or let it remain fluid. Instead of challenging the centre with a pawn, Black can also pursue an early initiative on the queenside and aim for ...b7–b5.

== Main variations ==
Position: a8 black rook, b8 black knight, c8 black bishop, d8 black queen, f8 black rook, g8 black king, a7 black pawn, b7 black pawn, c7 black pawn, e7 black pawn, f7 black pawn, g7 black bishop, h7 black pawn, d6 black pawn, f6 black knight, g6 black pawn, c4 white pawn, d4 white pawn, e4 white pawn, c3 white knight, e3 white bishop, f3 white pawn, a2 white pawn, b2 white pawn, g2 white pawn, h2 white pawn, a1 white rook, d1 white queen, e1 white king, f1 white bishop, g1 white knight, h1 white rook

Main variation after 5...0-0 6.Be3

The resulting middlegame is largely determined by how Black decides to counteract in the centre. The traditional break is to play ...e7–e5, but the alternative pawn break, ...c7–c5, even as a sacrifice has received more attention recently. After 5.f3, the main continuation is 5...0-0 6.Be3, although the popularity of the Sämisch Gambit (6...c5) has led many White players to explore 6.Nge2 and 6.Bg5 instead. After 6.Be3, Black has a wide choice of lines.

=== Black plays 6...e5 ===
The classical reply to the Sämisch is to counter in the centre with 6...e5. This does lock in Black's fianchettoed bishop on g7, and Black may need to work out plans to activate this piece in the middlegame; however, if the bishop somehow is released, it may become very powerful. White has the choice between closing the centre or to maintain the central tension. According to the theory by Cherniaev and Prokuronov, closing the centre with 7.d5 gives White good chances for an opening edge, although Garry Kasparov frequently played the black side of this line, while maintaining the tension with 7.Nge2 is "less promising", but is an important line for White players who prefer the 6.Nge2 move order.

When White chooses to close the centre with 7.d5, White's typical plan is to castle queenside, and then launch an assault on the kingside with moves like g4 and/or h4. Black's main decisions are on what pawn breaks to play for. Main lines include an immediate break with 7...c6, a preparation for the ...f5 break with 7...Nh5 or 7...Ne8, and closing up the c-file with 7...c5 and eventually play for breaks with ...b5 or ...f5. A particularly sharp line is David Bronstein's queen sacrifice 7...Nh5 8.Qd2 Qh4+ 9.g3 Nxg3 10.Qf2 Nxf1 11.Qxh4 Nxe3, where Black has given up the queen for two bishops and a pawn, and will also win a second pawn after 12...Nxc4. In return for the material, Black obtains a solid and compact position devoid of weaknesses, the safer king, and control over the dark squares. Cherniaev and Prokuronov were sceptical of whether Black had sufficient compensation after 12.Qf2, but the line is very dangerous if White plays nonchalantly.

When White maintains the tension, Black's main moves are 7...c6 and 7...exd4, while 7...Nc6?! 8.d5 Ne7 leaves the black knight on e7 poorly placed. Although trading in the centre with 7...exd4 opens up the diagonal for the bishop, White enjoys a space advantage with a grip on the d5-square. Continuing to maintain the tension with 7...c6, and development with ...Nbd7 is Black's most flexible option.

=== Sämisch Gambit, Benoni, and Accelerated Dragon lines: 6...c5 ===
Positionally, 6...c5 is Black's most natural break, attacking the White centre with a side pawn and leaving the a1–h8 diagonal open for the bishop on g7. The most obvious drawback is that 6...c5 loses a pawn to 7.dxc5 dxc5 8.Qxd8 Rxd8 9.Bxc5, and for this reason 6...c5 was previously thought to be impossible. However, Valery Chekhov began exploring the line as a deliberate gambit, and the line is now considered to give Black full compensation.

The compensation Black has for the pawn includes:

- The King's Indian bishop has an open long diagonal.
- Black has a lead in development, with four pieces in play.
- White's development has been hindered with the pawn placement on f3.
- White has a hole on d4 as well as other good targets for Black's knights.

A possible practical drawback to the gambit is that White is more or less able to force a draw against Black's best lines, e.g. after 9.Bxc5 Nc6 10.Nd5 Nd7 11.Bxe7 Nxe7 12.Nxe7+ Kf8 13.Nd5 Bxb2 14.Rb1 Bg7 15.Nh3 Nc5 16.Ng5, when Black should allow the repetition of position by 16...Kg8 17.Ne7+ Kf8 18.Nd5 Kg8.

The gambit is rarely accepted in contemporary grandmaster play; instead the main line is to head for a Benoni-type structure with 7.Nge2 followed by 8.d5, which frequently transposes to the Kapengut Variation of the Modern Benoni. However, after 7.Nge2, 7...cxd4 8.Nxd4 Nc6 transposes into the Accelerated Dragon variation of the Sicilian Defense, featuring a Maróczy Bind.

=== Byrne Variation: 6...c6 and 6...a6 ===
Robert Byrne developed a flexible approach where Black plays ...c6 and ...a6 in order to prepare the push ...b5. Black's direct counterstrike in the centre is postponed so that the queenside advance can proceed quickly.

White can decide to halt Black's ...b5 break by playing 7.a4 at the cost of weakening the dark squares on the queenside. After 7...a5, Black has gained control over the b4-square, and will usually win the c5-square as well. White has other lines that allow Black to play ...b5. 7.Qd2 usually intends queenside castling. 7.c5 (or 7.Nge2 a6 8.c5) is a positional line, aiming to clamp down on the queenside and gain control over the b6-square. Probably the most popular response to the Byrne is 7.Bd3 aiming for a speedy mobilization of the kingside pieces, but allowing Black to proceed with the ...b5 plan. White's prospects of gaining an initiative on the kingside means that Black often delays castling so as not to come under attack there.

If Black wants to transpose into the Byrne while avoiding the 7.Bd3 lines, the flexible 6...a6 can be played first. This way, Black retains the option of playing ...c5 or ...c6 depending on the circumstances.

=== Panno Variation: 6...Nc6 ===
The Panno line, named after Oscar Panno, is a sharp and highly theoretical system which can lead to very complicated play. Black holds back the c-pawn for the time being, and aims to put the knight on d4. The immediate plan is to prepare queenside counterplay with ...a6, ...Rb8 followed by ...b5.

The main line of the Panno is 7.Nge2 a6 8.Qd2 Rb8. White's main positional system is to continue with 9.Nc1 e5 (Black needs to secure a hold of the centre) 10.d5 Nd4. Here the pawn grab 11.Bxd4? exd4 12.Qxd4 loses to 12...Nxe4!, so White usually challenges the d4-knight with 11.Nb3 or 11.N1e2.

Other seventh move alternatives include the aggressive continuations 7.h4 and 7.g4 aiming for a kingside attack, and 7.Rb1 and 7.Rc1 which aims to meet the ...b5 break.

=== Other lines against 6.Be3 ===
- 6...Nbd7 was popular in the early 1990s. Cherniaev and Prokuronov, however, believe White obtains an edge with 7.Nh3, with the plan of bringing the knight to f2.
- 6...a5 is a line favoured by Mark Hebden. The idea behind the move is to advance the a-pawn down the board to a4. Spending two tempi on pushing the pawn to a4 costs time, but Black has secured the a5-square as a comfortable perch for the queen, and the advance a4–a3 may come up later in the game.
- 6...b6 was once played as a means of preparing the break with ...c5, but since the Sämisch gambit shows that 6...c5 can be played immediately, Chris Ward considers the line to be slightly inferior.

=== Other sixth moves for White ===
Since the Sämisch gambit shows that 6.Be3 does not really prevent 6...c5, some players have turned to alternatives. These alternatives include 6.Nge2 which postpones the decision of where to put the c1-bishop, and 6.Bg5 aiming for a more active development and preventing 6...e5? due to the pin after 7.dxe5 dxe5 8.Qxd8 Rxd8 9.Nd5.

== Sidelines ==
Although most lines in this variation have Black castling at move five, it is certainly possible for Black to delay castling, even to junctures well into the middlegame. A rare move such as 5...c6 holds Black's options open while contesting the d5-square, anticipating White's central advance d4–d5, freeing Black's queen on the a5–d8 diagonal, and keeping White guessing.
