= 1960 USSR Chess Championship =

27th USSR Chess Championship

27th Soviet Chess Championship (1960)
- Location: Leningrad

Champion
- Viktor Korchnoi

The 1960 Soviet Chess Championship was the 27th edition of USSR Chess Championship. Held from 26 January to 27 February 1960 in Leningrad. The tournament was won by Viktor Korchnoi. The final were preceded by semifinals events at Cheliabinsk, Tallinn and Yerevan. Mikhail Tal was missing, preparing for his world title match against Botvinnik. Paul Keres was in Cuba as part of a cultural delegation from Estonia.

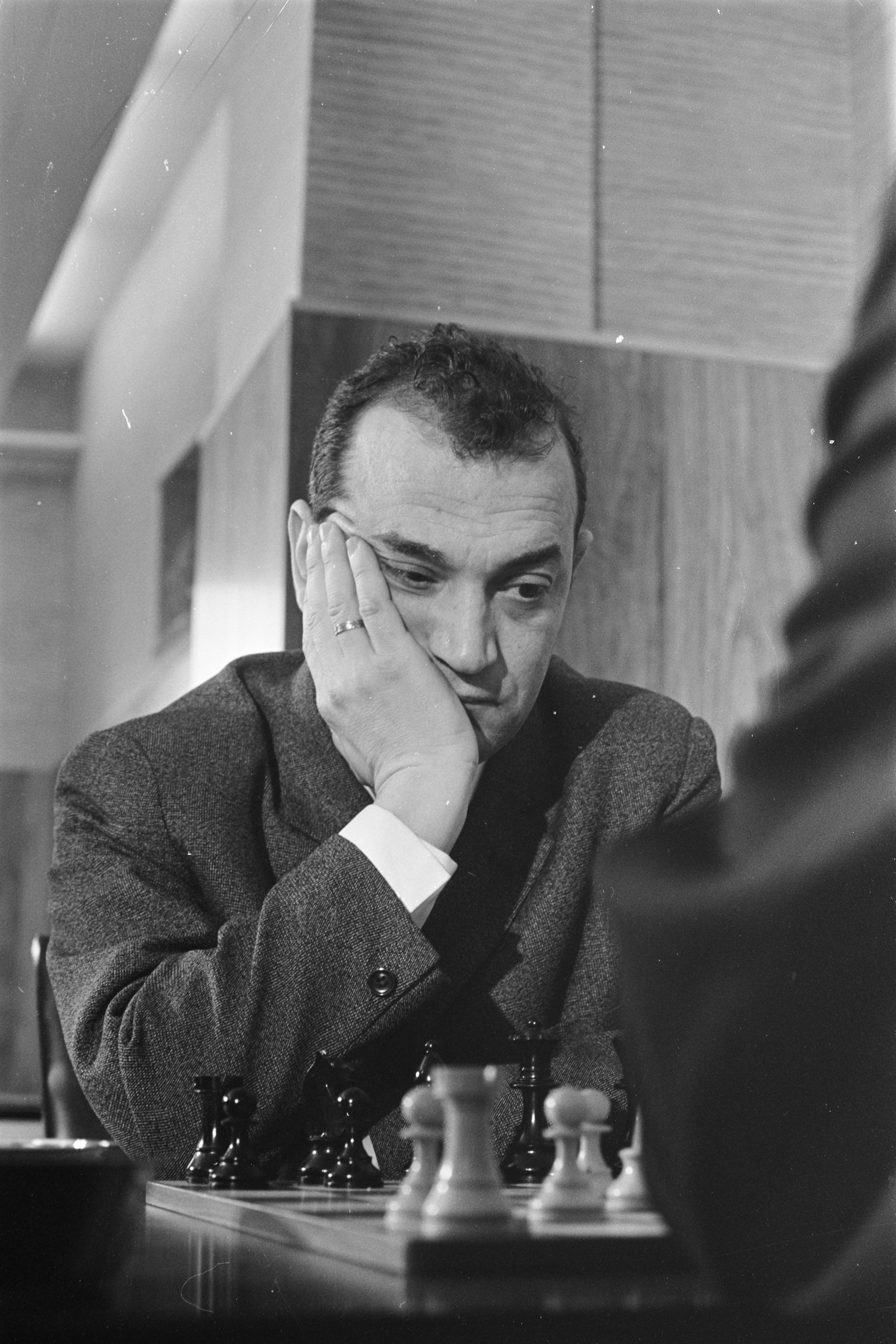
Viktor Korchnoi

== Table and results ==
Mikhail Tal was missing, preparing for his world title match against Botvinnik. Paul Keres was in Cuba as part of a cultural delegation from Estonia. Spassky was in a moment of creative experimentation and got a bad place in the championship. He at this time was trying to play in a less academic style. As a result of his recent training period with Alexander Tolush, he often sacrificed material. The crowning moment for this attacking approach came in his winning against David Bronstein in the 16th round in a King's Gambit.

After 15 rounds the leaders were Petrosian and Korchnoi with 11 points, Geller 10½ and Polugayevsky, Taimanov and Krogius 9. In the 16th round both leaders suffered. Petrosian had been unwell and lost to Averbakh. Korchnoi had a promising position against Bagirov, but in a crucial position where he should have played Bc3xRe1, with good chances, he unaccountably touched his a6 bishop, intending to make the capture with it on el. Naturally, he resigned on the spot. It was one of the most incredible mistakes of his career, and so Korchnoi described the move:

My opponent had just taken of my rooks, and I was considering my reply.'First', I thought, 'I'll take his rook with my bishop, on the next move I'll move my other bishop'. The two bishops stood side by side, and I picked up the wrong one, the one that was attacking nothing. Without completing the move, I left the hall, leaving a thousand fans, who were tensely following my game, in a state of bewilderment, which shortly turned to grief.

Such a blunder would have shattered a lesser man, but Korchnoi came back. He beat Krogius in the next round. The decisive game was an Alekhine's Defence in the 18th round encounter against Geller. Korchnoi with black pieces deferred development of his knight to c6, and outplayed Geller in complications to score a priceless victory.

27th Soviet Chess Championship (1960)
	Player	1	2	3	4	5	6	7	8	9	10	11	12	13	14	15	16	17	18	19	20	Total
1	(Soviet Union) Viktor Korchnoi	-	½	1	0	1	½	1	½	1	1	0	0	½	1	1	1	1	1	1	1	14
2	(Soviet Union) Tigran Petrosian	½	-	½	½	0	0	½	1	1	1	½	½	1	1	½	1	1	1	1	1	13½
3	(Soviet Union) Efim Geller	0	½	-	½	½	½	½	1	0	½	1	1	1	1	1	1	1	1	½	1	13½
4	(Soviet Union) Vladimir Bagirov	1	½	½	-	½	½	½	½	0	1	1	½	1	1	½	1	½	½	0	1	12
5	(Soviet Union) Lev Polugaevsky	0	1	½	½	-	0	½	0	½	½	1	1	1	½	1	½	½	½	1	1	11½
6	(Soviet Union) Yuri Averbakh	½	1	½	½	1	-	½	½	½	½	½	0	½	1	½	½	½	½	1	½	11
7	(Soviet Union) Vassily Smyslov	0	½	½	½	½	½	-	½	1	½	½	1	½	½	½	½	½	½	1	½	10½
8	(Soviet Union) Mark Taimanov	½	0	0	½	1	½	½	-	½	½	1	½	½	0	½	0	1	1	1	1	10½
9	(Soviet Union) Nikolai Krogius	0	0	1	1	½	½	0	½	-	½	1	1	½	0	½	½	½	½	1	½	10
10	(Soviet Union) Boris Spassky	0	0	½	0	½	½	½	½	½	-	½	½	1	0	½	1	½	1	1	1	10
11	(Soviet Union) Vladimir Simagin	1	½	0	0	0	½	½	0	0	½	-	0	½	½	1	½	1	1	1	1	9½
12	(Soviet Union) Anatoly Lutikov	1	½	0	½	0	1	0	½	0	½	1	-	0	½	½	1	½	½	1	0	9
13	(Soviet Union) David Bronstein	½	0	0	0	0	½	½	½	½	0	½	1	-	1	1	0	1	½	½	1	9
14	(Soviet Union) Eduard Gufeld	0	0	0	0	½	0	½	1	1	1	½	½	0	-	½	0	1	1	0	0	7½
15	(Soviet Union) Iivo Nei	0	½	0	½	0	½	½	½	½	½	0	½	0	½	-	1	0	1	0	1	7½
16	(Soviet Union) Leonid Shamkovich	0	0	0	0	½	½	½	1	½	0	½	0	1	1	0	-	0	1	0	0	6½
17	(Soviet Union) Vladimir Liberzon	0	0	0	½	½	½	½	0	½	½	0	½	0	0	1	1	-	0	1	0	6½
18	(Soviet Union) Alexey Suetin	0	0	0	½	½	½	½	0	½	0	0	½	½	0	0	0	1	-	1	½	6
19	(Soviet Union) Yuri Sakharov	0	0	½	1	0	0	0	0	0	0	0	0	½	1	1	1	0	0	-	1	6
20	(Soviet Union) Bukhuti Gurgenidze	0	0	0	0	0	½	½	0	½	0	0	1	0	1	0	1	1	½	0	-	6
