= Maróczy Bind =

Chess opening and pawn structure

Position: a8 black rook, c8 black bishop, d8 black queen, e8 black king, f8 black bishop, g8 black knight, h8 black rook, a7 black pawn, b7 black pawn, d7 black pawn, e7 black pawn, f7 black pawn, h7 black pawn, c6 black knight, g6 black pawn, c4 white pawn, d4 white knight, e4 white pawn, a2 white pawn, b2 white pawn, f2 white pawn, g2 white pawn, h2 white pawn, a1 white rook, b1 white knight, c1 white bishop, d1 white queen, e1 white king, f1 white bishop, h1 white rook
The Maróczy Bind as chess opening
Position: a7 black pawn, b7 black pawn, d7 black pawn, e7 black pawn, f7 black pawn, h7 black pawn, g6 black pawn, c4 white pawn, e4 white pawn, a2 white pawn, b2 white pawn, f2 white pawn, g2 white pawn, h2 white pawn
The Maróczy Bind as pawn structure
- Moves: 1.e4 c5 2.Nf3 Nc6 3.d4 cxd4 4.Nxd4 g6 5.c4
- ECO: B36
- Origin: Swiderski vs. Maróczy, Monte Carlo 1904
- Named after: Géza Maróczy
- Parent: Sicilian Defence, Accelerated Dragon
- Synonym: Maróczy pawn structure

In chess, the Maróczy Bind (Hungarian: [ˈmɒroːt͡si]) is a term alternately used to refer to an opening or its associated pawn structure, named for the Hungarian grandmaster Géza Maróczy. When the Bind is discussed as an opening, it is defined as 1.e4 c5 2.Nf3 Nc6 3.d4 cxd4 4.Nxd4 g6 5.c4. The Maróczy Bind opening is a continuation of the Sicilian Defence, Accelerated Dragon, where 5.c4 is the characteristic move.

When the Maróczy Bind is discussed as a pawn structure, attention is paid to strategic plans of both sides, as required by the placement of pawns. Chess writers also note the possibility for the same or similar pawn structure to arise by transposition, especially via the English Opening or the King's Indian Defense. In the Maróczy pawn structure, White's c- and e-pawns control the d5-square, making it difficult for Black to open their position with ...d5. Instead, Black often settles for the less active ...d6 and may develop a Hedgehog pawn formation against the Bind.

== History ==
The first game known to feature what would later be known as the Maróczy Bind was Swiderski–Maróczy, Monte Carlo 1904. Oddly, Maróczy never played it as White. However, the 1906 March–April issue of the Wiener Schachzeitung reproduced from Magyar Sakklap Maróczy's annotations to the game Tarrasch–Marshall, Nuremberg (match) 1905 (which began 1.e4 c5 2.d4 cxd4 3.Nf3 a6 4.Nxd4 g6 5.Be2 Bg7 6.Nc3 Nc6). "On four consecutive moves (moves 3–6) Maróczy stressed the value of the move c4."

For several decades, it was generally considered tantamount to a positional blunder for Black to allow the Maróczy Bind. For example, Harry Golombek, in Capablanca's 100 Best Games of Chess (1947), gave a question mark to Black's fourth move in the line 1.e4 c5 2.Ne2 d6 3.d4 cxd4 4.Nxd4 g6, a form of the Accelerated Dragon variation of the Sicilian Defence, stating that 4...Nf6 was "necessary" to make White block his c-pawn with 5.Nc3 and thus avoid the Bind. Golombek gave an exclamation point to 5.c4, establishing the Bind, explaining: "This strong move gives White control of the centre and Black must grovel about to find a counter-attack." Reuben Fine, writing in 1948, also considered the Bind very strong for White.

Beginning in the 1950s, the Maróczy Bind became less feared as new methods were found for Black to combat it. The ninth edition of Modern Chess Openings (1957) stated that Black had "worked loose" from the strictures of the Bind. Larry Evans wrote in the tenth edition (1965) that in response to the Accelerated Dragon, the Maróczy Bind "was once considered a refutation but now has lost much of its punch. White retains an advantage in space but Black's position is fundamentally sound." That remains the prevailing view, but some recent writers still emphasize that Black must find active counterplay or else be "strangled". However, John Nunn and Joe Gallagher observe:

Although the Maroczy Bind is slightly passive for Black, players such as Larsen, Petursson and Velimirović have shown that by patiently waiting for a lapse of concentration from White this line can offer winning chances for Black. The theoretical opinion is that White should maintain a slight advantage, but no one should believe that this is a line in which White cannot lose.

== Common opening lines ==
Common opening lines that reach a Maróczy Bind position include:

- The Accelerated Dragon variation of the Sicilian Defence: 1.e4 c5 2.Nf3 Nc6 3.d4 cxd4 4.Nxd4 g6 5.c4 (diagram)
- The Kalashnikov Variation of the Sicilian Defence: 1.e4 c5 2.Nf3 Nc6 3.d4 cxd4 4.Nxd4 e5 5.Nb5 d6 6.c4
- The Prins Variation of the Sicilian Defence: 1.e4 c5 2.Nf3 d6 3.d4 cxd4 4.Nxd4 Nf6 5.f3 e5 6.Nb3 Be7 7.c4
- The Chekhover Variation of the Sicilian Defence: 1.e4 c5 2.Nf3 d6 3.d4 cxd4 4.Qxd4 Nc6 5.Bb5 Bd7 6.Bxc6 Bxc6 7.c4
- The Taimanov Variation of the Sicilian Defence: 1.e4 c5 2.Nf3 e6 3.d4 cxd4 4.Nxd4 Nc6 5.Nb5 d6 6.c4
- The Kramnik Variation of the Sicilian Defence: 1. e4 c5 2. Nf3 e6 3. c4 Nc6 4. d4 cxd4 5. Nxd4
- The Kan Variation of the Sicilian Defence: 1.e4 c5 2.Nf3 e6 3.d4 cxd4 4.Nxd4 a6 5.c4
- The Moscow Variation of the Sicilian Defence: 1.e4 c5 2.Nf3 d6 3.Bb5+ Bd7 4.Bxd7 Qxd7 5.c4 Nc6 6.d4 cxd4 7.Nxd4
- The Advance Variation of the Smith–Morra Gambit Declined: 1.e4 c5 2.d4 cxd4 3.c3 d3 4.c4
- The Sämisch Variation of the King's Indian Defence: 1.d4 Nf6 2.c4 g6 3.Nc3 Bg7 4.e4 d6 5.f3 0-0 6.Be3 c5 7.Nge2 cxd4 8.Nxd4
- The Orthodox Variation of the King's Indian Defence: 1.d4 Nf6 2.c4 g6 3.Nc3 Bg7 4.e4 d6 5.Nf3 0-0 6.Be2 c5 7.0-0 cxd4 8.Nxd4
- The Averbakh Variation of the King's Indian Defence: 1.d4 Nf6 2.c4 g6 3.Nc3 Bg7 4.e4 d6 5.Be2 0-0 6.Bg5 c5 7.dxc5 Qa5 8.Bd2 Qxc5
- The Four Pawns Attack of the King's Indian Defence: 1.d4 Nf6 2.c4 g6 3.Nc3 Bg7 4.e4 d6 5.f4 0-0 6.Nf3 c5 7.dxc5 Qa5 8.Bd2 Qxc5
- The Petrosian Variation of the Queen's Indian Defence: 1.d4 Nf6 2.c4 e6 3.Nf3 b6 4.a3 Ba6 5.Qc2 Bb7 6.Nc3 c5 7.e4 cxd4 8.Nxd4
- The Classical Variation of the Nimzo-Indian Defence: 1.d4 Nf6 2.c4 e6 3.Nc3 Bb4 4.Qc2 c5 5.dxc5, later followed by e4
- In the Hedgehog formation, the opponent (typically White) has a type of Maróczy Bind, for example: 1.c4 c5 2.Nf3 Nf6 3.g3 b6 4.Bg2 Bb7 5.Nc3 e6 6.0-0 a6 7.d4 cxd4 8.Qxd4 d6 9.e4 Be7 10.b3 Nbd7

== See also ==
- List of chess openings
- List of chess openings named after people
