= B79 =

B79 or B-79 may refer to:

- Sicilian Defense, Dragon Variation, according to the Encyclopaedia of Chess Openings
- Silver City Highway, in New South Wales, Australia, designated B79
- Tamworth in the list of postal districts in the United Kingdom
