= Four Pawns Attack =

The Four Pawns Attack can refer to a variety of different chess openings, including:

- King's Indian Defence, Four Pawns Attack
- the Four Pawns Attack in Alekhine's Defence
- the Four Pawns Attack in the Modern Benoni
