= Maroczy =

Maroczy may refer to:

- Géza Maróczy, Hungarian chess grandmaster
- Maróczy Bind, a chess pawn formation named after Géza Maróczy
