= Hedgehog (chess) =

Chess opening strategy

Position: h2 white pawn, g2 white pawn, f2 white pawn, b2 white pawn, a2 white pawn, e4 white pawn, c4 white pawn, f6 black knight, e6 black pawn, d6 black pawn, b6 black pawn, a6 black pawn, h7 black pawn, g7 black pawn, f7 black pawn, e7 black bishop, d7 black knight, c7 black queen, b7 black bishop, g8 black king, e8 black rook, c8 black rook

Black's basic Hedgehog formation

The Hedgehog is a pawn formation in chess adopted usually by Black that can arise from several openings. Black exchanges the pawn on c5 for White's pawn on d4, and then places pawns on the squares a6, b6, d6, and e6. These pawns form a row of "spines" behind which Black develops their forces. Typically, the bishops are placed on b7 and e7, knights on d7 and f6, queen on c7, and rooks on c8 and e8 (or c8 and d8). Although Black's position is cramped, it has great latent energy, which may be released if Black is able to play ...b5 or ...d5 at some point. These pawn breaks are particularly effective because White usually places pawns on c4 and e4 (the Maróczy Bind).

== Black manoeuvring ==
Once the basic Hedgehog structure is in place, and depending on how White responds, Black has various ways of reorganizing their pieces. The knight on d7 often hops to c5, where it attacks a white pawn on e4; or to e5, where it attacks a pawn on c4. The knight on f6 can go to e8 (when Black placed their rook on d8) to defend the d6 pawn, or to d7 or even to h5, if unoccupied. The black queen can be moved to b8 (unmasking the rook on c8 and perhaps supporting ...b5) or a8 (eyeing d5). A rook placed on d8 serves to defend the d6-pawn and support its push to d5. Sometimes Black plays ...Bf8, ...g6, and ...Bg7 (or more simply ...Bf6 if f6 is vacant) to exert some influence over d4. Or the same bishop can be brought to c7 (via d8) to target White's kingside (in conjunction with a queen on b8). There are also situations where Black can create a kingside attack, by playing ...Kh8, ...Rg8, and ...g5, often followed by doubling rooks on the g-file and pushing the g-pawn to g4.

Traditional chess strategy would have frowned upon Black's setup, since their pieces have little room in which to manoeuvre. In the early 1970s, "'hedgehog' was a generic term for any setup that was cramped, defensive and difficult to attack", but today refers specifically to this formation. The Hedgehog first became extensively analysed in the 1970s, when players began to appreciate the rich variety of strategic ideas that arose from it. While Black's position is cramped, it is also relatively free of weaknesses. There is no obvious way for White to attack Black's pawn structure, but as outlined above, Black has several methods at their disposal for creating counterplay. Thus the Hedgehog has retained its popularity as a system of development in modern praxis.

== Early history ==
The ideas behind the Hedgehog were originally developed in the English Opening. The Hedgehog Defence, in particular, refers to a variation in the Symmetrical English (1.c4 c5) where Black adopts this setup: 1.c4 c5 2.Nf3 Nf6 3.g3 b6 4.Bg2 Bb7 5.Nc3 e6 6.0-0 Be7 7.d4 cxd4 8.Qxd4 d6. Other openings where Black often uses the setup include the Queen's Indian Defence, and the Taimanov and Kan Variations of the Sicilian Defence.

It is also possible for White to adopt a Hedgehog setup, but this happens more rarely. This did occur, however, in Fischer–Andersson, Siegen 1970, one of the first games to feature this method of development. Fischer's crushing victory in this game, in which the Kh1/Rg1/g4 method of attack was vividly demonstrated, so impressed Andersson that he later became one of the foremost Hedgehog exponents himself, for example Karpov–Andersson, Milan 1975.

== See also ==
- Hippopotamus Defence
- List of chess openings
