= Hugh Myers =

American chess master and author

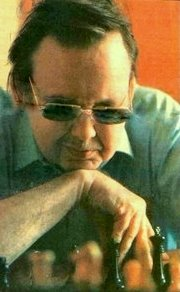
- Myers in 1992

Personal information
- Born: Hugh Edward Myers; January 23, 1930 Decatur, Illinois
- Died: December 22, 2008 (aged 78) Davenport, Iowa

Chess career
- Country: United States
- Title: National Master
- Peak rating: 2350

Hugh Edward Myers (January 23, 1930 – December 22, 2008) was an American chess master and author. He won or tied for first in the state chess championships of Illinois (1951), Wisconsin (1955), Missouri (1962), and Iowa (1983), as well as the USCF Region VIII (Iowa, Illinois, Missouri, and Nebraska) championship (1983). He played first board for the Dominican Republic in the 1968 and 1976 Chess Olympiads.

Myers is best known for his writings on unusual chess openings such as the Nimzovich Defense (1.e4 Nc6). The eccentric opening 1.c4 g5!? is known as Myers' Defense because of his advocacy of it in his writings and games. Myers wrote numerous editions of his book on the Nimzovich Defense, as well as three other books on the openings. He edited and published the Myers Openings Bulletin in 1979–1988 and the New Myers Openings Bulletin in 1992–1996.

Myers also involved himself in the controversy over FIDE President Florencio Campomanes' termination of the 1984–85 World Championship match between Karpov and Kasparov, and was instrumental in helping Campomanes secure reelection in 1986.

== Chess career ==
Myers was born in Decatur, Illinois on January 23, 1930. At age 10, he learned to play chess from Lasker's Manual of Chess, a famous treatise by former world champion Emanuel Lasker. The book had a lasting influence on him, including Lasker's "encouragement regarding the openings, 'the ground trodden above is yet rather new, and you may explore it as well as anyone else.' " After his father brought home the December 1943 issue of Chess Review, Myers began visiting the Decatur Chess Club weekly. In 1946, he played in his first chess tournament, finishing second in the Decatur high school championship.

Myers majored in history and political science at Millikin University, graduating in 1951. While in college, he became obsessed with chess. In 1950–52, he won the Decatur city championship thrice consecutively by lopsided scores, scoring 14.5 out of 16 possible points, 15 out of 16, and a perfect 14 out of 14, respectively.

In 1951, Myers tied for first in the Illinois championship with Kimball Nedved and John Tums, each scoring 6 out of 7 possible points in the Swiss system tournament, but Nedved won on Sonneborn–Berger tiebreaking points. Myers then challenged Nedved to a match, which Myers won in 1952 with 3.5 out of 4. Myers won the 1955 Wisconsin state championship with 6.5 out of 7, drawing in the last round with Arpad Elo. Myers was a natural chess teacher demonstrated by the impact of his 1957 short lesson at the Manhattan Club to Michael Morrisroe who used the exact technique to defeat Erich Marchand in the quarter finals of the 1960 New York State Championship. In 1962, Myers won the Missouri Open championship on tiebreak over J. Theodorovich of Toronto, each scoring 5 out of 6.

From 1965 to 1968, Myers was the top-rated player in the Dominican Republic. He played first board for its national chess team at the Chess Olympiads at Lugano 1968 (scoring 4 wins, 5 draws, and 6 losses) and Haifa 1976 (scoring 3 wins, 3 draws, and 5 losses).

In 1983, Myers tied for first with Mitch Weiss in the Iowa State Championship, a round robin, each scoring 3.5 out of 4. Later that year, Myers and Weiss also tied for first in the USCF Region VIII (Iowa, Illinois, Missouri, and Nebraska) championship, each scoring 4.5 points in the 5-round Swiss. In 1994, Myers played third board for "Fear Itself", the team that won the U.S. Amateur Team Championship.

Myers died in Davenport, Iowa on December 22, 2008.

== Chess strength ==
Myers achieved an Elo rating of 2350 while living in the Dominican Republic. In the United States, he first attained a rating over 2200 (National Master level) in 1983 and kept it over 2200 for ten years. Between 1993 and 2003, his rating fell from 2219 to 2054.

== Chess writing and contributions to opening theory ==
Myers' A Chess Explorer (2002)

Myers is best known for his writings on unorthodox chess openings. He published the books New Strategy in the Chess Openings (1968), The Nimzovich Defense (1973; French edition 1979; revised editions 1986, 1993, and 1995), Reversed King Pawns, Mengarini's Opening (1977), and Exploring the Chess Openings (1978). His most important opening work was on the Nimzowitsch Defense, on which he was considered the foremost authority. Myers' autobiography, A Chess Explorer, was issued in 2002.

From 1979 to 1988, Myers edited and published 38 issues of the Myers Openings Bulletin. Nine double-sized issues, called the New Myers Openings Bulletin, came out in 1992–96. The ChessBase.com obituary of Myers observes that in the Myers Openings Bulletin.

Myers offered a 'diet' of opening articles, historical features, book reviews, and topical commentary. He included contributions from many writers who later gained prominence, and the Bulletin soon would build up a loyal readership throughout the world.

FIDE Master Allan Savage observes that the Bulletin "became a cause celebre for practitioners of unusual openings, a forum for airing of opinions of diverse chess writers, and a target for those conformists who would malign the very existence of offbeat ideas." Savage calls Myers "a trailblazer, iconoclast, original thinker, curmudgeon, and at his peak, a strong master".

Probably Myers' best-known contribution to opening theory is the eccentric line 1.c4 g5!?, a sort of Grob's Attack (1.g4) with colors reversed. It has become known as Myers' Defense because of his advocacy of it. When Myers discussed it in New Strategy in the Chess Openings his publisher, without consulting him, inserted in the book the remark, "I can't believe that 1.c4 g5 is good for Black. There is no need to even give the reasons for my opinion; the move 1.-- g5 violates chess principles as I learned them." International Master John L. Watson, an authority on the English Opening, wrote that this variation "has become the theoretical property of Hugh Myers, who has both played it and published proposed improvements." Watson opined that the line "seems playable", but it is largely ignored in general opening manuals. It is not mentioned at all in the current edition of Modern Chess Openings (2008), the Encyclopedia of Chess Openings (1996), or Batsford Chess Openings 2 (1989), and it receives only a brief footnote in Nunn's Chess Openings (1999). In the first edition of Batsford Chess Openings (1982), future World Champion Garry Kasparov famously dismissed 1...g5 with the remark that, "Chess is not skittles."

== Chess controversy and politics ==
In 1985 and 1986, Myers wrote in the Myers Openings Bulletin about FIDE President Florencio Campomanes' controversial decision to terminate the 1984–85 Karpov–Kasparov World Championship match after 48 games, and schedule a new match later in 1985. Myers argued that the decision to stop the match and start afresh was in Kasparov's interest, since he had been trailing and would have needed three more victories to win the match, while Karpov needed only one. Chess historian Edward Winter later wrote, "This reasoning, originally voiced by hardly anyone except ... Myers, is now gaining ground." Myers also asserted that Kasparov's statements, which suggested that Campomanes had terminated the match at Karpov's behest and over Kasparov's opposition, were duplicitous.

In 1986, Campomanes hired Myers to write the bulletins at the Chess Olympiad later that year in Dubai, and to work for Campomanes' reelection as FIDE President. Campomanes' opponent was Lincoln Lucena, whose running mate was Raymond Keene, a candidate for General Secretary of FIDE. Myers wrote a series of ten bulletins for distribution to national chess federations, entitled F.I.D.E. Facts, that criticized Keene, as well as Lucena supporters such as Kasparov and David Levy. The November 1986 issue of CHESS magazine contained a written response, drafted by Myers and signed by Campomanes, to Keene's charges against Campomanes. Myers also created a cartoon that portrayed Lucena as a marionette controlled by Keene and Levy. Just before the election, Lucena withdrew, ensuring Campomanes' victory. Myers took credit for Campomanes' reelection, writing, "It could be reasonably argued that Campomanes was either a good guy or a bad guy, but I'm proud that discovering the truth and telling it proved that his opponents were worse."

== Notable games ==
Myers vs. Lombardy, 1957

Position: c8 black rook, f8 black rook, g8 black king, a7 black pawn, b7 black pawn, c7 black queen, d7 black bishop, f7 black pawn, g7 black pawn, e6 black pawn, h6 black pawn, d5 black knight, e5 white pawn, h5 white queen, b4 white pawn, c4 black knight, e4 white knight, a3 white pawn, g3 white pawn, f2 white pawn, g2 white bishop, h2 white pawn, a1 white rook, c1 white bishop, d1 white rook, g1 white king

Position after 19...Qc7
- Myers won the following game against an extremely strong American junior who won the World Junior Chess Championship later the same year with the only perfect score in its history and was awarded the Grandmaster title by FIDE in 1960. Annotations are based on those by Hans Kmoch in Chess Review. Myers included the decisive moment of the game on the cover of his autobiography A Chess Explorer.
  Myers–William Lombardy, Manhattan Chess Club championship semifinal, New York, 1957:
  1.g3 Nf6 2.Bg2 d5 3.Nf3 Bf5 4.c4 c6 5.cxd5 cxd5 6.Qb3 Bc8 7.0-0 e6 8.Nc3 Nc6 9.d4 Bd6 Here and on his next few moves Black plays strangely, initiating complications before having castled. Normal was 8...Be7 9.Rd1 0-0. 10.Rd1 h6 11.a3 Na5 12.Qc2 Bd7 13.b4 Nc4 14.e4! dxe4 15.Nxe4 Rc8 16.Ne5! Bxe5 17.dxe5 Nd5 18.Qe2 0-0 19.Qh5 Qc7 (diagram) 20.Rxd5!! exd5 21.Nf6+!! gxf6 Black must capture, since 21...Kh8 22.Bxh6! is even worse. 22.exf6 Nd6 23.Bxh6 Bf5 24.Bxd5 Qc2 25.Bxf8 Rxf8 26.Qh6 Ne8 27.Re1 Bg6 28.Rxe8 Qd1+ 29.Kg2 Qxd5+ 30.f3 Qd2+ 31.Qxd2 Rxe8 32.Qh6 1–0 Black resigned.
Myers vs. Leon, 1969

Position: b8 black knight, e8 black king, h8 black rook, e7 black pawn, g7 black bishop, h7 black pawn, b6 white queen, c6 black knight, e6 black pawn, g6 black queen, a5 white pawn, g5 white knight, c4 white rook, b2 white pawn, c2 white pawn, f2 white pawn, g2 white pawn, d1 white rook, e1 white king

Position after 28...Ke8
- Myers considered the following game one of his best. It shows his unconventional approach to the openings, with both of his rook pawns moved by move six. This game was also annotated by Kmoch, in Chess Life & Review.
  Myers–Juan Leon, San Juan, Puerto Rico Championship, 1969:
  1.e4 c5 2.Nf3 g6 3.h4 Bg7 3...h5 is better. 4.h5 d6 5.Bb5+ Bd7 6.a4 gxh5? 6...Nf6. 7.Rxh5 a6 8.Bxd7+ Qxd7 9.d3 Nf6 10.Rh4 Nc6 11.Nc3 0-0-0 12.a5 d5 13.Na4! Kb8? 14...Qd6. 14.Bf4+ Ka7 15.Nxc5 Qe8 16.Bc7 Rc8 17.Bb6+ Ka8 18.Qe2 dxe4 19.dxe4 Nd7 20.Nxa6! bxa6 21.Qxa6+ Kb8 22.e5! Threatening 23.Rb4. Rc7 23.Bxc7+ Kxc7 24.e6! fxe6 25.Ng5 Qg6 26.Rc4 Ndb8 27.Qb6+ Kd7 28.Rd1+ Ke8 (diagram) 29.Qxb8+! 1–0 If 29...Nxb8, 30.Rc8#.
