= Sicilian Defence, Dragon Variation =

Chess opening

Dragon Variation
Position: a8 black rook, b8 black knight, c8 black bishop, d8 black queen, e8 black king, f8 black bishop, h8 black rook, a7 black pawn, b7 black pawn, e7 black pawn, f7 black pawn, h7 black pawn, d6 black pawn, f6 black knight, g6 black pawn, d4 white knight, e4 white pawn, c3 white knight, a2 white pawn, b2 white pawn, c2 white pawn, f2 white pawn, g2 white pawn, h2 white pawn, a1 white rook, c1 white bishop, d1 white queen, e1 white king, f1 white bishop, h1 white rook
- Moves: 1.e4 c5 2.Nf3 d6 3.d4 cxd4 4.Nxd4 Nf6 5.Nc3 g6
- ECO: B70–B79
- Origin: Louis Paulsen (c. 1880)
- Named after: Constellation Draco
- Parent: Open Sicilian

In chess, the Dragon Variation is a variation of the Sicilian Defence that begins with the moves:

1. e4 c5
2. Nf3 d6
3. d4 cxd4
4. Nxd4 Nf6
5. Nc3 g6

In the Dragon, Black's bishop is fianchettoed on g7, castling on the king's side while aiming the bishop at the centre and queenside. In one of the most popular and theoretically important lines, the Yugoslav Attack, White meets Black's setup with Be3, Qd2 and Bh6, exchanging off the Dragon bishop, castling queenside, and launching a kingside pawn storm with h4–h5 and g4. Black often counterattacks using the semi-open c-file. The result is often both sides attacking the other's king with all available resources. The line is considered one of the sharpest of all chess openings.

The modern form of the Dragon was originated by German master Louis Paulsen around 1880. It was played frequently by Henry Bird that decade, then received general acceptance around 1900 when played by Harry Nelson Pillsbury and other masters.

== History ==
Karpov vs. Korchnoi, 1974

Position: c8 black rook, g8 black king, a7 black pawn, b7 black pawn, d7 black bishop, e7 black pawn, f7 black pawn, h7 black pawn, d6 black pawn, f6 black knight, g6 black pawn, h6 white queen, a5 black queen, c5 black rook, g5 white pawn, e4 white pawn, c3 white knight, d3 white rook, f3 white pawn, a2 white pawn, b2 white pawn, c2 white pawn, e2 white knight, c1 white king, h1 white rook

Position after 20.g5. Karpov (White) sacrifices a pawn so he can play Rd5 followed by Nd5, pressuring the f6-knight, without giving up the c2-pawn.

In his 1953 autobiography, the Russian chess master and amateur astronomer Fyodor Dus-Chotimirsky claimed that he coined the name "Dragon Variation" in 1901, after the fancied resemblance between Black's kingside pawn structure and the constellation Draco. The earliest known printed reference, found by chess historian Edward Winter, is in the Jan–Feb 1914 issue of Wiener Schachzeitung.

The variation was played in the 1974 Candidates Final between Anatoly Karpov and Viktor Korchnoi.

Some recent famous exponents of the Dragon are Veselin Topalov, Andrew Soltis, Jonathan Mestel, Chris Ward, Sergei Tiviakov, Alexei Fedorov, Mikhail Golubev, the late Tony Miles and Eduard Gufeld. Garry Kasparov used the Dragon with success as a surprise weapon against world title challenger Viswanathan Anand in 1995 but did not use it subsequently. The Dragon saw a decline in popularity in the late 1990s as a result of White resuscitating the old line with 9.0-0-0. It is still seen at the grandmaster level, though the Najdorf Variation is by far the most common line after 2...d6 in the Sicilian, with the Classical Variation a distant second.

== Main line: 6.Be3 Bg7 7.f3 0-0 8.Qd2 Nc6 9.0-0-0 ==
Position: a8 black rook, c8 black bishop, d8 black queen, f8 black rook, g8 black king, a7 black pawn, b7 black pawn, e7 black pawn, f7 black pawn, g7 black bishop, h7 black pawn, c6 black knight, d6 black pawn, f6 black knight, g6 black pawn, d4 white knight, e4 white pawn, c3 white knight, e3 white bishop, f3 white pawn, a2 white pawn, b2 white pawn, c2 white pawn, d2 white queen, g2 white pawn, h2 white pawn, c1 white king, d1 white rook, f1 white bishop, h1 white rook

Position after 6.Be3 Bg7 7.f3 0-0 8.Qd2 Nc6 9.0-0-0

The main line of the Dragon continues 6.Be3 Bg7 7.f3 0-0 8.Qd2 Nc6 9.0-0-0. The point of f3 is to safeguard e4 and to stop Black from playing ...Ng4, harassing White's dark-squared bishop. Black cannot play 6...Ng4?? immediately because of 7.Bb5+ either winning a piece after 7...Bd7 as White can play Qxg4 due to the pin of the bishop to the king, or winning an exchange and pawn after 7...Nc6 8.Nxc6 bxc6 9.Bxc6+, forking king and rook.

After 8...Nc6, after years of players believing that White's best play and chance for advantage lay in 9.Bc4, the old main line 9.0-0-0 made a major comeback and is the dominant move today. It used to be thought that allowing 9...d5 here allows Black to equalise easily, but further analysis and play have proven that things are not so clear cut. In fact, a brilliant idea by Vassily Ivanchuk in the 9...d5 line seemed to give White the advantage, so some Black players began experimenting with 9...Bd7 and 9...Nxd4. In these times, brilliancies found for White one day would frequently be overturned by some newly discovered resource for Black, before a new brilliancy emerged. A case in point is the following line where the evaluation of a major line was turned upside down overnight because of a queen sacrifice – Golubev credits "J. Diaz" and himself with discovering it independently in 1996: 9.0-0-0 d5!? 10.Kb1!? Nxd4 11.e5! Nf5! 12.exf6 Bxf6 13.Nxd5 Qxd5! 14.Qxd5 Nxe3 15.Qd3 Nxd1 16.Qxd1 Be6!, where Black has almost sufficient compensation for the queen.

=== 9...d5 10.exd5 Nxd5 11.Nxc6 bxc6 12.Bd4 ===
Position: a8 black rook, f8 black rook, g8 black king, a7 black pawn, b7 black pawn, e7 black pawn, f7 black pawn, h7 black pawn, e6 black bishop, f6 black bishop, g6 black pawn, f3 white pawn, a2 white pawn, b2 white pawn, c2 white pawn, g2 white pawn, h2 white pawn, b1 white king, d1 white queen, f1 white bishop, h1 white rook

Position after 16...Be6!

Despite the difficulties, 9...d5 remains the usual move for Black, and the main line continues 10.exd5 Nxd5 11.Nxc6 bxc6. While the pawn on d5 appears to be hanging, the seemingly obvious 12.Nxd5? runs into 12...cxd5 13.Qxd5 Qc7! when 14.Qxa8 Bf5 15.Qxf8+ Kxf8 leaves Black with a pair of very potent bishops which, together with the queen on c7, will cause trouble for White's king. Better (and the main line) is 12.Bd4, which might continue 12...e5 13.Bc5 Be6!!; capturing the exchange after 14.Bxf8? relinquishes too much control of the dark squares after 14...Qxf8. Instead, the theory continues 14.Ne4 Re8 with a complex positional battle ahead.

== Yugoslav Attack: 9.Bc4 ==
Yugoslav Attack

Position: a8 black rook, d8 black queen, f8 black rook, g8 black king, a7 black pawn, b7 black pawn, d7 black bishop, e7 black pawn, f7 black pawn, g7 black bishop, h7 black pawn, c6 black knight, d6 black pawn, f6 black knight, g6 black pawn, c4 white bishop, d4 white knight, e4 white pawn, c3 white knight, e3 white bishop, f3 white pawn, a2 white pawn, b2 white pawn, c2 white pawn, d2 white queen, g2 white pawn, h2 white pawn, a1 white rook, e1 white king, h1 white rook

Position after 6.Be3 Bg7 7.f3 0-0 8.Qd2 Nc6 9.Bc4 Bd7

Position: d8 black queen, f8 black rook, g8 black king, a7 black pawn, b7 black pawn, d7 black bishop, e7 black pawn, f7 black pawn, g7 black bishop, h7 black pawn, d6 black pawn, g6 black pawn, h6 white bishop, d4 white knight, e4 black knight, g4 white pawn, c3 black rook, e3 white queen, f3 white pawn, a2 white pawn, b2 white pawn, c2 white pawn, c1 white king, d1 white rook, h1 white rook

Example line with exchange sacrifice: 10.0-0-0 Rc8 11.Bb3 Ne5 12.h4 Nc4 13.Bxc4 Rxc4 14.h5 Nxh5 15.g4 Nf6 16.Bh6 Nxe4! 17.Qe3 Rxc3!

The Yugoslav Attack (9.Bc4) often features race-to-mate pawn storms on opposite sides of the board. The purpose of Bc4 is to prevent Black from playing the freeing move ...d6–d5, which would break open the centre; thus, attacking on the flanks of the board is typical. The variations resulting from this move are notorious for having been heavily analysed and often results in extremely tactical and doubled-edged positions. White keeps a firm grip on the centre while advancing aggressively towards the enemy king with f3–f4–f5 and even g2–g3–g4, often with the aim of delivering mate down the h-file. However, danger exists in overextending and allowing Black to gain the initiative with a deadly counterattack. Black's strategy is centred around the half-open c-file and the ability to push the a- and b-pawns.

White's attack almost plays itself ... weak players even beat Grandmasters with it. I once thumbed through several issues of Shakhmatny Bulletin, when the Yugoslav attack was making its debut, and found the ratio was something like nine wins out of ten in White's favour. Will Black succeed in reinforcing the variation? Time will tell.

— Bobby Fischer, My 60 Memorable Games (1969)

Typical White strategies are exchanging dark-squared bishops by Be3–h6, sacrificing material to open the h-file, and exploiting pressure on the a2–g8 diagonal and the weakness of the d5-square. In addition to covering d5, White's light-squared bishop helps cover White's queenside and controls the a2–g8 diagonal leading to Black's king. However, the bishop is exposed on c4 to an attack by a rook on c8, and usually has to retreat to b3, giving more time for Black to organize an attack.

Typical themes for Black are exchanging White's light-squared bishop by ...Nc6–e5–c4, sacrificing the exchange on c3 to break up White's queenside pawns, sacrifices to open up the long diagonal for Black's bishop on g7, advancing the b-pawn, and exerting pressure using the long diagonal and c-file. Black will generally omit ...a6 as White will generally win in a straight pawn attack since Black has given White a hook on g6 to attack. In general, White will avoid moving the pawns on a2/b2/c2, and so Black's pawn storm will nearly always be slower than White's on the kingside. Black can frequently obtain an acceptable endgame even after sacrificing the exchange because of White's h-pawn sacrifice and doubled pawns.

After the usual 9...Bd7, 10.0-0-0 is White's most popular choice. The usual response 10...Rc8 develops Black's rook to the open c-file, pressuring the queenside and also preparing a discovered attack on White's bishop. To avoid this, White moves the bishop out of the way with 11.Bb3. Black has also tried 10...Qb8, preparing either 11...Rc8 or 11...b5. 10.h4 (such as in Anatoly Karpov–Viktor Korchnoi in the 1974 Candidates Final) and 10.Bb3 are also common for White. Though White will usually play these three moves at some point, the move order matters a great deal. 10.h4 usually transposes to the Soltis Variation while avoiding the Chinese Dragon, because after 10.h4 Rb8?!, 11.h5! is now good for White. 10.Bb3 also usually transposes into the main lines but Black has the additional possibility of 10...Nxd4 11.Bxd4 b5, known as the Topalov System. White's best chances in this line at the moment involve castling short and trying for a positional edge in an atypical fashion for the Yugoslav Attack.

=== Soltis Variation: 9...Bd7 10.0-0-0 Rc8 11.Bb3 Ne5 12.h4 h5 ===
Position: c8 black rook, d8 black queen, f8 black rook, g8 black king, a7 black pawn, b7 black pawn, d7 black bishop, e7 black pawn, f7 black pawn, g7 black bishop, d6 black pawn, f6 black knight, g6 black pawn, e5 black knight, h5 black pawn, d4 white knight, e4 white pawn, h4 white pawn, b3 white bishop, c3 white knight, e3 white bishop, f3 white pawn, a2 white pawn, b2 white pawn, c2 white pawn, d2 white queen, g2 white pawn, c1 white king, d1 white rook, h1 white rook

After 9.Bc4 Bd7 10.0-0-0 Rc8 11.Bb3 Ne5 12.h4 h5

The Soltis Variation was the main line of the Dragon up until the late 1990s. Garry Kasparov played the move three times in the 1995 World Championship against Viswanathan Anand, scoring two wins and a draw. The line goes 9.Bc4 Bd7 10.0-0-0 Rc8 11.Bb3 Ne5 12.h4 h5 (the key move, holding up White's kingside pawn advance). Other important deviations for Black are 12...Qa5 and 12...Nc4. More recently, White players have often avoided the Soltis by playing 12.Kb1, which has proven so effective that Black players have in turn tried to dodge this with 10...Rb8, known as the Chinese Dragon, or, more recently, the drawish 11...Nxd4.

There are many ways for White to combat this line, but most of them have been shown to be flawed: if 13.g4?! hxg4, both 14.h5 Nxh5 and 14.f4 Nc4 do little to advance White's attack as Black would be able to keep the kingside closed. White has also tried 13.Bg5 Rc5, but even then the advance of the g-pawn does not promise White much: 14.g4 hxg4 15.f4!? Nc4 16.Qe2 Qc8!, a multi-purpose move which threatens ...Nxb2, increases the pressure on the c-file, prevents f4–f5 and safeguards the passed g-pawn.

=== 12.Kb1 ===
After 12.Kb1, Black's most straightforward idea is no longer effective: 12...Nc4 13.Bxc4 Rxc4 can be met with 14.g4 and White has the advantage since with the king on b1, there is no clear way for Black to counterattack. 12...a5 is also fruitless since White can respond by playing 13.a4!, stunting Black's queenside play and creating an outpost on b5. Thus, with no immediate attack available, Black picks the waiting move 12...Re8 which allows Bh6 to be met with ...Bh8, retaining Black's dark-square bishop. 12...Re8 also protects the e7-pawn, so that the queen is no longer tied down to its defence. Another possibility for Black is 12...a6, which has been played by Magnus Carlsen.

=== 11...Nxd4 ===
11...Nxd4 has emerged as a common move with a high draw rate. 12.Bxd4 b5 is the usual continuation, as in the Topalov System, but with White having already castled queenside.

=== Chinese Dragon: 10...Rb8 ===
The main line with 10.0-0-0 Rc8 11.Bb3 Ne5 12.Kb1 has proven to be so effective over time that some Dragon players have attempted to dodge the line with the interesting 10...Rb8. This complicated line has been called the Chinese Dragon. The most topical line is currently 11.Bb3, which is designed to prevent the sacrifice of the b-pawn immediately, buying time for White. Black now has the move 11...Na5 which both threatens to play 12...Nc4 13.Bxc4 bxc4, opening the b-file or just removing the bishop straight off with ...Nxb3. Originally h4 was played in this position, but recently the move 12.Bh6 has come to prominence, leading to a sharp and double-edged game in which Black has good practical chances.

=== Old line: 10...Qa5 ===
The approach with 10...Qa5, originally considered the main variation, was thus given the ECO code B79 (whereas ...Rc8 was not given any). It was advocated by GM Chris Ward in his books Winning with the Dragon and Winning with the Dragon 2. This line has fallen slightly out of favor due to difficulties encountered in White's 12.Kb1 and the credibility of the Soltis Variation in Rc8 lines mentioned above.

== Classical Variation: 6.Be2 ==
The Classical Variation, 6.Be2, is the oldest White response to the Dragon. It is the second most common White response behind the Yugoslav Attack. After 6...Bg7, White has two main continuations:

- After 7.Be3 Nc6 8.0-0 0-0, White's two main responses are 9.Nb3 and 9.Qd2. The knight move is a very common one in the Classical Variation and Qd2 is well met with 9...d5.
- After 7.0-0 White has a choice of e3 and g5 for the dark-squared bishop. If it is placed on e3, the game will usually transpose into the lines above. In his book Starting Out: The Sicilian Dragon, Andrew Martin calls Be3 "the traditional way of handling the variation", and describes Bg5 as being "much more dangerous" and "White's best chance to play for a win in the Classical Dragon." As with Be3, after Bg5, White will normally place a knight on b3, avoiding an exchange on d4.

== Levenfish Attack: 6.f4 ==
The Levenfish Attack, 6.f4, is named after Russian GM Grigory Levenfish who recommended it in the 1937 Russian Chess Yearbook. It is not currently very common in the highest levels in chess. White prepares 7.e5, attacking Black's f6-knight. Therefore, 6...Nc6 or 6...Nbd7 is considered mandatory, as after 6...Bg7 7.e5 Nh5 8.Bb5+ Bd7 9.Qe2 Bxb5 10.Qxb5+ Nd7 11.Nf3 dxe5 12.fxe5 a6 13.Qe2 Qb6 14.Bd2 Qe6 15.0-0-0 Nxe5 16.Rhe1 White has some initiative.

== Harrington–Glek Variation: 6.Be3 Bg7 7.Be2 0-0 8.Qd2 ==
The Harrington–Glek Variation is another option for White. Named for Grandmaster Igor Glek, who has devoted considerable effort evaluating the resulting positions for White. 6.Be3 Bg7 7.Be2 0-0 8.Qd2!? GM John Emms wrote, "Although it's difficult to beat the Yugoslav in terms of sharp, aggressive play, 7.Be2 0-0 8.Qd2!? also contains a fair amount of venom ... White's plans include queenside castling and a kingside attack. And there's a major plus point in that it's much, much less theoretical!"

Position: a8 black rook, c8 black bishop, d8 black queen, f8 black rook, g8 black king, a7 black pawn, b7 black pawn, e7 black pawn, f7 black pawn, g7 black bishop, h7 black pawn, c6 black knight, d6 black pawn, f6 black knight, g6 black pawn, d4 white knight, e4 white pawn, c3 white knight, e3 white bishop, a2 white pawn, b2 white pawn, c2 white pawn, d2 white queen, e2 white bishop, f2 white pawn, g2 white pawn, h2 white pawn, c1 white king, d1 white rook, h1 white rook

Position after 9.0-0-0

After the main moves 8...Nc6 9.0-0-0 we reach a tabiya for the position. Here, Black has several options for continuation, listed in order of popularity:

- 9...Nxd4 This move can lead to both positional and attacking opportunities for both sides. White must keep aware that Black may have opportunities to offer an exchange sacrifice on c3 in order to exploit the unprotected e4 pawn. 10.Bxd4 Be6 11.Kb1! a good preparatory move in many lines of the Sicilian Dragon. White wants to be able to play Nd5 if the situation becomes conducive. White's king is also getting away from the open c-file, where much of Black's counterplay can develop. 11...Qa5 With this move we reach a roughly equal position, and play can take on a life of its own.
- 9...Bd7 This move avoids a sacrifice, allowing all of Black's pieces to be retained. 10.h4! h5! Black needs to keep White's pawns from making a breaking capture. 11.f3 Rc8 12.Kb1 Ne5 13.Bg5! Black can now go for broke with 13...b5!? with an interesting position.
- 9...Ng4 This move is played to pick up the bishop pair by exploiting the absence of f3 in White's opening. White is usually fine with allowing the trade of bishop for knight considering that White's light-squared bishop does little in this line in comparison with the f6-knight's defensive abilities. White will also gain the use of f2–f3 to drive Black back after recapturing with the bishop. 10.Bxg4 Bxg4 11.f3 Bd7 12.Kb1 Ne5 13.b3! Rc8 14.h4 Re8! Again, both sides have good chances.
- 9...d5!? A pawn sacrifice similar to lines in the more common Yugoslav mainlines. 10.exd5 Nxd5 11.Nxc6 bxc6 12.Nxd5! cxd5 13.Qxd5 Capturing the pawn is safer here as compared with the main line after 7. f3 and 9. 0-0-0, as the following moves will reveal. 13...Qc7! giving up two rooks for the queen but keeping attacking chances. 14.Qxa8! Bf5 15.Qxf8+ Kxf8 16.Bd3! In the main 9. 0-0-0 line, 16. Bd3?! Qe5! forks e3 and b2, which has the effect of rendering the entire line after 11. Nxd5 unplayable. Here, however, the bishop on e3 is defended, and chances remain roughly equal after 16...Be6 17.Kb1.
- 9...a6 10.Kb1 Nxd4 11.Bxd4 b5 12.h4! h5 13.f3 Be6 14.g4! J.Van der Wiel vs. H. Eidam, Gran Canaria 1996.

== White's sixth-move alternatives ==
Other options on White's sixth move include 6.Bc4, 6.f3, and 6.g3.

== Comparison to other variations ==
When Black adopts the Dragon formation without 2...d6, there is a common plan of playing d7–d5 in one move, which, in many positions can immediately equalise, but not playing ...d6 allows White additional plans. These lines include the Accelerated Dragon (1.e4 c5 2.Nf3 Nc6 3.d4 cxd4 4.Nxd4 g6) and Hyper-Accelerated Dragon (1.e4 c5 2.Nf3 g6). In the regular Dragon, playing d6–d5 after d7–d6 constitutes a loss of tempo.

Another option for Black is to play what has been called the "Dragodorf", which combines ideas from the Dragon with those of the Najdorf Variation. While this line may be played via the Dragon move order (see the Yugoslav Attack with 9.Bc4), Black can arrive at it with a Najdorf move order: 1.e4 c5 2.Nf3 d6 3.d4 cxd4 4.Nxd4 Nf6 5.Nc3 a6 6.Be3 g6 (or 5...g6 6.Be3 a6), with the idea of Bg7 and Nbd7. Such a move order would be used to try to avoid a Yugoslav type attack; for instance, after 1.e4 c5 2.Nf3 d6 3.d4 cxd4 4.Nxd4 Nf6 5.Nc3 a6, White could play 6.Be2 or 6.f4. In both cases, especially the latter, a Yugoslav-style attack loses some momentum. Usually the bishop is more ideally placed on c4, where it can pressure f7 and help defend the white king (though the 9.0-0-0 variation of the Dragon shows that this is not completely necessary), and if White plays f4 and then castles queenside, they must always be on guard for ...Ng4 ideas, something which the move f3 in traditional Dragon positions usually discourages. Nonetheless, a Yugoslav-style attack is still playable after both 6.Be2 g6 or 6.f4 g6.

== ECO codes ==
The Encyclopaedia of Chess Openings has ten codes for the Dragon Variation, B70 through B79. After 1.e4 c5 2.Nf3 d6 3.d4 cxd4 4.Nxd4 Nf6, there is:

- B70: 5.Nc3 g6
- B71: 5.Nc3 g6 6.f4 (Levenfish Variation)
- B72: 5.Nc3 g6 6.Be3
- B73: 5.Nc3 g6 6.Be3 Bg7 7.Be2 Nc6 8.0-0 (Classical Variation)
- B74: 5.Nc3 g6 6.Be3 Bg7 7.Be2 Nc6 8.0-0 0-0 9.Nb3
- B75: 5.Nc3 g6 6.Be3 Bg7 7.f3
- B76: 5.Nc3 g6 6.Be3 Bg7 7.f3 0-0
- B77: 5.Nc3 g6 6.Be3 Bg7 7.f3 0-0 8.Qd2 Nc6 9.Bc4
- B78: 5.Nc3 g6 6.Be3 Bg7 7.f3 0-0 8.Qd2 Nc6 9.Bc4 Bd7 10.0-0-0
- B79: 5.Nc3 g6 6.Be3 Bg7 7.f3 0-0 8.Qd2 Nc6 9.Bc4 Bd7 10.0-0-0 Qa5 11.Bb3 Rfc8 12.h4

== See also ==
- Sicilian Defence, Accelerated Dragon
- Sicilian Defence § Hyper-Accelerated Dragon: 2...g6
- List of chess openings
