= Pawn storm =

Chess tactic

A pawn storm, sometimes called a pawn avalanche, is a chess tactic in which several pawns are moved in rapid succession toward the opponent's defenses. A pawn storm usually involves adjacent pawns on the flank of the board, such as the queenside (a-, b-, and c-files) or the kingside (f-, g-, and h-files). A pawn storm can also happen on the center of the board.

When involving only two pawns, a pawn roller is a chess tactic in which two connected passed pawns are used to mutually defend each other to promotion. This allows the pawns to more easily travel down the board without possibly being captured. This differs from a pawn storm, as a pawn storm utilizes more than two pawns to travel down the board, and a pawn storm is typically used to attack or overwhelm an opponent's defenses.

An exact type of formation of a pawn storm/roller is a pawn phalanx, which is when two or more pawns are next to each other on the same rank, allowing them to control more squares in front and support each other's advances.

== Objective ==
One can launch a pawn storm for many reasons. Probably the most common of these is to initiate a mating attack, in which the pawns are used to open files for pieces, or less commonly to brick in the king and form a mating net before taking decisive action. Another common reason for launching a pawn storm is to simply activate one's pieces, especially the rooks, by opening files. A pawn storm can also be used to lead to material gain or a strategic advantage. Strategic advantages that can result from pawn storms include the creation of outposts, the weakening of the opponent's pawn structure, or simply a space advantage. These benefits are especially typical in the case of a queenside minority attack. When a pawn storm is taking place on a wing, if the attacking pawns are advancing against a greater number of pawns than the ones that are being used to attack, it is called a minority attack. Pawn storms can also lead to the gain of several tempi if the pawns can manage to repeatedly kick the opponent's pieces, but this is not a usual motive in itself.

Pawn storms are typical in several openings. The first plan can be clearly seen in such sharp openings as the Sicilian Najdorf or the Yugoslav Attack, among others. In both of these cases, many lines will see White and Black castle on opposite sides of the board, and play for checkmate by throwing everything they can at each other's king. In many lines of the King's Indian Defense, White will take up a pawn storm on the queenside in order to win material, while Black will create a pawn storm on the kingside in order to begin a mating attack. The aforementioned minority attack can arise from a great many openings, a notable one being the Exchange Queen's Gambit. The Closed Ruy Lopez also frequently sees Black engage in a queenside pawn storm so as to gain space and subsequently gain play on that side. The Modern Benoni can also lead to pawn storms, typically in the centre for White, and on the queenside for Black.

The objective of pawn rollers is typically to advance to promotion. However, some pawn rollers can also be used as a pawn storm; pawn rollers can be used to attack an enemy's defenses. Sometimes, piece sacrifices are made in order to make a pawn storm effective or to make a pawn storm work, as they can help open up the position for other pieces or for the pawns themselves.

== Weaknesses ==
Pawn storms and rollers can however become weak if not executed properly. Overextension can occur, where pawns are too far advanced without sufficient support, leaving the pawns vulnerable to attacks. They can also be predictable, allowing the opponent to counterattack. When pawns advance, they cannot move backwards, so squares they leave undefended behind them can become weak. Pawn storms can also weaken the pawn structure and allow the opponent to create checkmate threats. Pawn storms can also be stopped by way of restraining their movement and blockading the pawns.

When organized in a pawn phalanx, pawns do not defend each other, so they require other pieces for support to remain strong, or they will become weak and vulnerable to attacks.

== Examples ==
Anand vs. Kasparov, United States 1995

Position: a8 black rook, f8 black bishop, g8 black king, b7 white queen, f7 black pawn, g7 black pawn, h7 black pawn, b6 white bishop, d6 white pawn, e6 black queen, a5 white pawn, c5 white pawn, e3 black pawn, g3 black rook, h3 white pawn, e2 white bishop, g2 white pawn, h2 white king, g1 white rook

Position after 35.Kh2, demonstrated is Anand's pawns far advanced on the queenside. Kasparov resigned after the move.

A pawn storm will often be directed toward the opponent's king after it has castled toward one side (e.g. Fischer–Larsen, 1958). Successive advances of the pawns on that side might rapidly cramp and overwhelm the opponent's position.

In game 9 of the Classical World Chess Championship 1995 between Viswanathan Anand and Garry Kasparov, Anand played as the white pieces and Kasparov played as the black pieces. During the game, Anand was able to launch a queenside attack with a pawn storm, leading to his win against Kasparov in the round.

Fischer vs. Petrosian, Yugoslavia 1959

Position: a7 black king, b7 black pawn, d7 black queen, f7 black pawn, a6 black pawn, c5 black knight, e5 white pawn, c4 white queen, d3 black rook, f3 white bishop, g3 white pawn, d2 black pawn, f2 white pawn, g2 white king, b1 white rook

Position after 43.Qc4

On the left is an example of a pawn roller directed at queening a passed pawn; the diagram is taken from a game in which Tigran Petrosian was playing the black pieces against Bobby Fischer. Over the next fourteen moves, Petrosian storms his twin pawns down the a- and b- files, forcing Fischer's resignation.
