= Chris Ward (chess player) =

English chess grandmaster (born 1968)

Personal information
- Born: 26 March 1968 (age 58)

Chess career
- Country: England
- Title: Grandmaster (1996)
- Peak rating: 2531 (July 2003)

Christopher Geoffrey Ward (26 March 1968) is a British chess Grandmaster (GM), chess coach, and author. He grew up in North West Kent, on the edge of Vigo Village and played his early chess at the village school chess club.

Ward went on to win the British Championship in 1996, earning the GM title in the process. He is the author of two well-received books on a variation of the Sicilian Defence known as the Dragon Variation, in addition to a number of other books on chess. He is also the author of the book Starting Out: Rook Endings, published by Everyman Chess (see Chess endgame literature). He also authored the It's your move series, the most challenging being the third book called It's your move: Tough Puzzles, which was published by Everyman Chess. Chris Ward teaches chess to many different schools, and plays Simultaneous games against club players, such as recent games against Hammersmith Chess Club and Petts Wood and Orpington Chess Club Chris has a brother called Jeremy, around the 2200 ECF mark.

Outside chess, Chris Ward is also a keen Salsa dancer.

== Bibliography ==
- Ward, Chris (1996), Endgame Play, Batsford, ISBN 0-7134-7920-5
- Ward, Chris (1999), The Queen's Gambit Accepted, Batsford, ISBN 0-7134-8467-5
- The Genius of Paul Morphy, (1997)
- Improve your Opening Play, (2000)
- Winning With the Sicilian Dragon 2 (2001)
- Starting Out: The Nimzo-Indian (2002)
- It's Your Move: Improvers, (2002)
- Unusual Queen's Gambit Declined (2002)
- Winning with the Dragon, (2003)
- It's Your Move: Tough Puzzles, (2004)
- Ward, Chris (2004), Starting Out: Rook Endgames, Everyman Chess, ISBN 1-85744-374-8
- Chris Ward. (2004), The Controversial Samisch King's Indian, Batsford, ISBN 978-0-7134-8872-2
- Play the Queen's Gambit (2006)
- Starting Out: Chess Tactics and Checkmates (2006)
