= Sicilian Defence, Accelerated Dragon =

Accelerated Dragon
Position: a8 black rook, c8 black bishop, d8 black queen, e8 black king, f8 black bishop, g8 black knight, h8 black rook, a7 black pawn, b7 black pawn, d7 black pawn, e7 black pawn, f7 black pawn, h7 black pawn, c6 black knight, g6 black pawn, d4 white knight, e4 white pawn, a2 white pawn, b2 white pawn, c2 white pawn, f2 white pawn, g2 white pawn, h2 white pawn, a1 white rook, b1 white knight, c1 white bishop, d1 white queen, e1 white king, f1 white bishop, h1 white rook
- Moves: 1.e4 c5 2.Nf3 Nc6 3.d4 cxd4 4.Nxd4 g6
- ECO: B34–B39
- Parent: Open Sicilian
- Synonym: Accelerated Fianchetto

The Accelerated Dragon (or Accelerated Fianchetto) is a variation of the Sicilian Defence that begins with the moves:

1. e4 c5
2. Nf3 Nc6
3. d4 cxd4
4. Nxd4 g6

The opening features an early ...g6 by Black. An important difference between this line and the Dragon is that Black avoids playing ...d7–d6 so that ...d7–d5 can be played later in one move, if possible. Black also avoids the Yugoslav Attack, but since White has not yet played Nc3, 5.c4 (the Maróczy Bind) is possible.

The Accelerated Dragon generally features a more positional style of play than in many other lines of the Sicilian.

== Alternative move order ==
The Accelerated Dragon can also be achieved through the following move order: 1.e4 c5 2.Nf3 g6 3.d4 cxd4 4.Nxd4 Nc6. After 2...g6, the opening is classified as the Hyperaccelerated Dragon. One benefit of using this move order is that Black avoids the Rossolimo. A downside is that this move order allows White to play 4.Qxd4 instead of 4.Nxd4.

== Main line ==
Position: a8 black rook, c8 black bishop, d8 black queen, e8 black king, h8 black rook, a7 black pawn, b7 black pawn, d7 black pawn, e7 black pawn, f7 black pawn, g7 black bishop, h7 black pawn, c6 black knight, f6 black knight, g6 black pawn, c4 white bishop, d4 white knight, e4 white pawn, c3 white knight, e3 white bishop, a2 white pawn, b2 white pawn, c2 white pawn, f2 white pawn, g2 white pawn, h2 white pawn, a1 white rook, d1 white queen, e1 white king, h1 white rook

Position after 7.Bc4

The traditional line continues: 5.Nc3 Bg7 6.Be3 Nf6 7.Bc4 (diagram). It is important for White to play accurately due to the sharp and tactical nature of the Accelerated Dragon. Some common inaccuracies include:

- 7.Be2?! O-O 8.O-O d5!, where Black achieves the thematic central pawn thrust ...d7-d5 in one tempo and obtains equality without much difficulty.
- 7.f3?! O-O 8.Qd2 d5!, for the same reason as above.
- 7.f3?! O-O 8.Bc4 Qb6!, introducing tactical motifs such as ...Nxe4, ...Ng4, and ...Qxb2.

The two main continuations for Black are 7...O-O and 7...Qa5.

7...O-O is the main line, after which White should proceed with 8.Bb3. Black can respond with 8...d6, transposing back into a regular Dragon. Black claims that White's Bb3 move is a waste of time, which gives Black the option of a quicker queenside attack. Since White is a tempo down from the regular Dragon lines (such as those in the Yugoslav Attack), the Dragon variations that are traditionally dangerous for Black are not as venomous here. Regardless, these lines are highly theoretical and can be just as sharp for both sides as in the Dragon. An alternative eighth move for Black is 8...a5, which leads to play that can be quite different from other Dragon lines.

7...Qa5 is a tricky alternative. Black's position has a lot of energy, since Black pins the knight on c3, and Black's pieces target the d4 knight and e4 pawn. White's light-squared bishop is also undefended. White should castle to avoid any unfavorable tactics. Instead of 8.O-O, common pitfalls include the following:

- 8.Qd2? Nxe4! 9.Nxc6 Qxc3! 10.Qxc3 Bxc3+ 11.bxc3 bxc6, and Black is a healthy pawn up with a pleasant position.
- 8.Nb3?! Qb4! 9.Bd3 Nxe4! 10.Bxe4 Bxc3+ 11.bxc3 Qxe4, where Black is once again a pawn up.
- 8.Nb3?! Qb4! 9.Nd2 Qxb2 10.Nb5 Qe5 11.f4 Qb8 12.e5 Nxe5 13.fxe5 Qxe5, giving Black three pawns and a strong initiative for the piece.
- 8.f3?! Qb4! 9.Bb3?! Nxe4! 10.Nxc6 Bxc3+ 11.bxc3 Qxc3+ 12.Ke2 dxc6!, where Black emerges two pawns up and the knight cannot be captured due to ...Bg4+.

== Maróczy Bind ==
Position: a8 black rook, c8 black bishop, d8 black queen, e8 black king, f8 black bishop, g8 black knight, h8 black rook, a7 black pawn, b7 black pawn, d7 black pawn, e7 black pawn, f7 black pawn, h7 black pawn, c6 black knight, g6 black pawn, c4 white pawn, d4 white knight, e4 white pawn, a2 white pawn, b2 white pawn, f2 white pawn, g2 white pawn, h2 white pawn, a1 white rook, b1 white knight, c1 white bishop, d1 white queen, e1 white king, f1 white bishop, h1 white rook

Position after 5.c4

The Maróczy Bind arises after 5.c4 (diagram). This line is a popular choice against the Accelerated Dragon, and is arguably White's most critical try. The move 5.c4 can be considered as the positional approach as opposed to 5.Nc3. The Maróczy Bind can be seen in other openings as well, for both colors, including the English Opening, the King's Indian Defence, and other lines in the Sicilian Defence. This bind is distinctive for two White pawns on c4 and e4 (c5 and e5 for Black), where they clamp down on the d5 square. White has a space advantage and more maneuverability for their pieces, but Black still has some counterplay, thanks to the possible breaks ...b5, ...d5, and ...f5.

Black can play classically with moves such as ...Bg7, ...Nf6, ...d6, and ...0-0. A sample line can be as follows: 5.c4 Bg7 6.Be3 Nf6 7.Nc3 0-0 8.Be2 d6 9.0-0; this is the main line in the Maróczy Bind. As long as the pawn structure remains static, Black does not mind an exchange of dark-squared bishops, since this leaves White with the bad light-squared bishop and weak dark squares. Therefore, it is sensible for White to try and keep the dark-squared bishop or to look for a chance to move the pawns to free the light-squared bishop. Black may also exchange knights with ...Nxd4 to free up their pieces, so White can consider retreating their knight from d4 to avoid exchanges and keep Black's position cramped. One possible plan for White is to expand on the queenside by moving the a1 rook off the long diagonal and playing for the pawn push b2-b4, perhaps prepared by a2-a3. Black may play ...a5 in order to make White's b4 plan difficult and to gain space on the queenside.

Another popular setup for Black is the Gurgenidze System. Black aims to immediately exchange knights to avoid the cramped positions arising from the classical Maróczy Bind. Another benefit over the main line is that since White has not yet played Be3, a knight capture forces the White queen to recapture, where it can be under fire after ...Bg7 and ...0-0. Black may continue in typical Accelerated Dragon fashion by fianchettoing their bishop and castling. A common follow-up includes moves such as ...Be6, ...Qa5, ...Rfc8, ...Nd7, ...a6, and ...b5 to undermine White's queenside pawns. The main line goes: 5...Nf6 6.Nc3 d6 7.Be2 Nxd4 8.Qxd4 Bg7 9.Be3 0-0 10.Qd2 Be6 11.Rc1 Qa5 12.f3 Rfc8. A more modern alternative plan is to play ...a5, ...a4, and ...Qa5, where Black undermines the queenside pawns in a different manner. Black hopes to utilize the a1-h8 diagonal through the moves ...Nd7 and ...a3, exploiting the shaky positions of White's rook on a1 and knight on c3. Instead of 10...Be6, the line may continue as follows: 10... a5 11. 0-0 a4 12. f3 Qa5 13. Rac1 Be6 14. Nd5. Black can then exchange off the knight with ...Bxd5 and play on the dark squares.

== Passmore Variation ==
Position: a8 black rook, c8 black bishop, d8 black queen, f8 black bishop, h8 black rook, a7 black pawn, d7 black pawn, e7 black pawn, f7 black king, h7 black pawn, c6 black pawn, f6 black knight, g6 black pawn, d4 white queen, a2 white pawn, b2 white pawn, c2 white pawn, f2 white pawn, g2 white pawn, h2 white pawn, a1 white rook, b1 white knight, c1 white bishop, e1 white king, f1 white bishop, h1 white rook

Position after 9...Kxf7

Another common line seen in tournaments continues: 5.Nxc6 bxc6 6.Qd4 Nf6 7.e5 Ng8 (7...Nd5 works as well) 8.e6 Nf6 9.exf7+ Kxf7 (diagram), when both sides have equal chances. White often continues 10.Bc4+, attempting to add kingside pressure while developing a minor piece. Black defends easily, however, with 10...d5 or 10...e6, resulting in a position where his king is safe. Both players can choose to play positionally or otherwise will have variable results. Statistically, White's best continuation is 10.Be2 followed with 11.0-0.

== See also ==
- Sicilian Defence (including Sicilian Defence § Hyper-Accelerated Dragon)
- Sicilian Defence, Dragon Variation
