= King's Indian Defence, Four Pawns Attack =

Four Pawns Attack
Position: a8 black rook, b8 black knight, c8 black bishop, d8 black queen, e8 black king, h8 black rook, a7 black pawn, b7 black pawn, c7 black pawn, e7 black pawn, f7 black pawn, g7 black bishop, h7 black pawn, d6 black pawn, f6 black knight, g6 black pawn, c4 white pawn, d4 white pawn, e4 white pawn, f4 white pawn, c3 white knight, a2 white pawn, b2 white pawn, g2 white pawn, h2 white pawn, a1 white rook, c1 white bishop, d1 white queen, e1 white king, f1 white bishop, g1 white knight, h1 white rook
- Moves: 1.d4 Nf6 2.c4 g6 3.Nc3 Bg7 4.e4 d6 5.f4
- ECO: E76–E79
- Named after: Four pawns on d4, c4, e4, f4
- Parent: King's Indian Defence

The Four Pawns Attack in the King's Indian Defence is a chess opening that begins with the moves:

1. d4 Nf6
2. c4 g6
3. Nc3 Bg7
4. e4 d6
5. f4

White immediately builds up a large pawn centre in order to gain a spatial advantage. Black first develops his pieces, then tries to attack White's centre by means of the pawn advances ...e7–e5, ...c7–c5 or ...f7–f5, depending on circumstances.

This formation has never attracted serious interest in high-level play, although Alexander Alekhine used it three times in the 1924 New York City tournament with a score of +1−0=2. Danish grandmaster Bent Larsen also occasionally experimented with the Four Pawns Attack.

The main variations of the Four Pawns Attack are:

- The main line 5...0-0 6.Nf3 c5, when after 7.d5 Black can attack White's centre with the pawn sacrifice 7...b5 or the quieter 7...e6. The latter can transpose into the Modern Benoni.
- The modern alternative 5...0-0 6.Nf3 Na6!? aims at sacrificing a pawn with 7...e5 and going into tactical complications.

The relevant Encyclopaedia of Chess Openings codes are E76 through E79.

== The main line ==
Position: a8 black rook, b8 black knight, c8 black bishop, d8 black queen, f8 black rook, g8 black king, a7 black pawn, b7 black pawn, f7 black pawn, g7 black bishop, h7 black pawn, d6 black pawn, f6 black knight, g6 black pawn, c5 black pawn, d5 white pawn, e4 white pawn, f4 white pawn, c3 white knight, f3 white knight, a2 white pawn, b2 white pawn, e2 white bishop, g2 white pawn, h2 white pawn, a1 white rook, c1 white bishop, d1 white queen, e1 white king, h1 white rook

After 6...c5 7.d5 e6 8.Be2 exd5 9.cxd5

The main line of the Four Pawns Attack after 6...c5 7.d5 continuing 7...e6 8.Be2 exd5 9.cxd5 now gives Black a choice of the old main line with 9...Re8 or the new main line with 9...Bg4.

=== Old main line with 9...Re8 ===
Highly tactical possibilities abound in which the critical position occurs after 10.e5 dxe5 11.fxe5 Ng4 12.Bg5, a position which is perhaps better avoided by Black. After 12...Qb6 13.0-0 Nxe5 14.Nxe5 Bxe5 15.Qd2 Bf5 white was not able to achieve any significant advantage.

=== New main line with 9...Bg4 ===
A common-sense move with the idea of exchanging the bishop for the knight and taking the energy out of White's e5 attacking plan. The development of the bishop also frees Black's queenside for smooth development and active play. Invariably, development continues with 10.0-0 Nbd7 when White faces the possibly of kicking the bishop with h3 or delaying with Re1 first. In the game Jesús Nogueiras–Garry Kasparov, White opted for the immediate kick, 11.h3 Bxf3 12.Bxf3 Re8 in a game that was eventually drawn.

=== White varies on move 7, 8 or 9 ===
- White can vary with 7.dxc5 or 7.Be2; this allows Black to equalize with accurate play.
- Of the various alternatives at move eight, 8.dxe6 opening the d5-square has gained interest. The reply 8...Bxe6 leaves White a possible f5 push at an appropriate moment, so normally 8...fxe6 is played when White has a choice of the solid 9.Be2 or the aggressive 9.Bd3.
- 9.exd5. Although once common, the f4-pawn looks out of place and White's weakness on e4 is clear. White varying with 9.e5 has a certain logic to quicken the centre play, however the reply 9...Ne4 seems to adequately halt the plan.

=== The sacrifice 7...b5 ===
Having similar ideas to the Benko Gambit, this b5 push remains uncharted. After 8.cxb5 (8.e5 is to be considered) 8...a6, White has choices between the possibility of taking the a-pawn, or supporting the pawn on b5. The more common response is to support with 9.a4.

== The modern alternative 6...Na6!? ==
Position: a8 black rook, c8 black bishop, d8 black queen, f8 black rook, g8 black king, a7 black pawn, b7 black pawn, c7 black pawn, e7 black pawn, f7 black pawn, g7 black bishop, h7 black pawn, a6 black knight, d6 black pawn, f6 black knight, g6 black pawn, c4 white pawn, d4 white pawn, e4 white pawn, f4 white pawn, c3 white knight, f3 white knight, a2 white pawn, b2 white pawn, g2 white pawn, h2 white pawn, a1 white rook, c1 white bishop, d1 white queen, e1 white king, f1 white bishop, h1 white rook

Position after 6...Na6!?

Black first develops one additional piece before reacting in the centre. The idea is to bring in the push e7–e5 instead of the main line c7–c5. This is a gambit in which Black hopes to take advantage of the slight underdevelopment of White forces in order to win back the sacrificed pawn or to directly attack the white king. The move ...Na6 is designed post on c5 (once the d4-pawn has left) in order to attack the e4-pawn. An important difference between this move and Nbd7 is that Na6 does not block the queenside bishop.

After the normal 7.Be2, Black must immediately unleash 7...e5!? when White has several possibilities, but only a capture on e5 is assumed to make sense:

- 8.0-0 is not well considered for White because of the hidden tactical idea 8...exd4 9.Nxd4 Nc5 10.Bf3 Re8 11.Re1 Bg4! when White cannot win the piece on g4 without losing the Nd4 (by the Bg7).
- 8.fxe5 dxe5 9.Nxe5 is considered dubious but is better than its reputation, e.g. 9...c5 10.Be3 cxd4 (better: Na6-b4) 11.Bxd4 Qe7?! (Gallagher) 12.Nf3! and White is a full pawn up because Black cannot recapture the e4-pawn without running into trouble: 12...Nxe4? 13.Bxg7 Kxg7 14.Qd4+ Nf6 15.Nd5 Qd6 16.Ng5! Nb4 17.Qxf6 Qxf6 18.Nxf6 Nc2+ 19.Kd2 Nxa1 20.Ng5-e4 Bf5 21.Rxa1 and white has advantage.
- 8.fxe5 dxe5 9.Nxe5 c5 10.d5 is considered slightly dubious due to Nxe4! and Black is fine after Nxe4 Bxe5.
- 8.dxe5 dxe5 9.Nxe5 (9.Qxd8 is considered slightly inferior because it develops Black's Rf8) 9...Nc5 10.Bf3 Qxd1+ 11.Kxd1 Rd8+ 12.Kc2 Nfxe4! (a temporary piece sacrifice, e.g. game Hansen–Berg, Aarhus 1991) 13.Nxe4 Bf5 14.Re1 Bxe5 15.fxe5 Rd4 (thus Black regains his piece) 16.b3! Nxe4 17.Kb2 Nc5 when White still has a slight advantage thanks to good diagonals for his bishop pair, but Black controls the d-file and can try to pressure the e5-pawn.
- 8.dxe5 dxe5 9.fxe5? is bad because Black can gain back the e5-pawn and leave White with a poor pawn structure.

== Black varies on move 5 ==
Black can also vary with 5...c5, electing to strike at the White centre before castling and discouraging any 6.e5 ideas from White. Teimour Radjabov, perhaps the leading contemporary practitioner of the King's Indian Defence, has been known to play this line. If 6.dxc5, Black can answer with ...Qa5, effectively forking the pawns at e4 and c5, regaining the material with a stronger centre and a lead in development. Generally, Black will follow up with 7...Qxc5, preventing White from castling at least temporarily and taking control of the sensitive g1–a7 diagonal, given that White has moved his f-pawn. If after 6...Qa5 White plays the materialistic 7.cxd6? then Black has 7...Nxe4 with advantage.
