= Eduard Gufeld =

Soviet chess grandmaster (1936–2002)

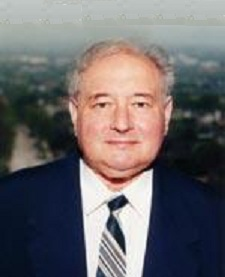

Personal information
- Born: Eduard Yefimovich Gufeld; 19 March 1936 Kyiv, Ukrainian SSR, Soviet Union
- Died: 23 September 2002 (aged 66) Los Angeles, California, U.S.

Chess career
- Country: Soviet Union; United States
- Title: Grandmaster (1967)
- Peak rating: 2570 (January 1977)
- Peak ranking: No. 22 (January 1977)

Eduard Yefimovich Gufeld (Russian: Эдуа́рд Ефи́мович Гу́фельд; 19 March 1936 – 23 September 2002) was a Soviet/American International Grandmaster of chess, and a chess author.

== Chess career ==
Gufeld began participating in chess tournaments in 1953 and won the junior championship of Ukraine the following year. He became an International Master in 1964 and an International Grandmaster in 1967. In 1977, he ranked 16th in the world with an Elo rating of 2570.

He moved to Tbilisi, Republic of Georgia, where he coached Maia Chiburdanidze, who became the youngest women's world chess champion in 1978. After the fall of the Soviet Union, he emigrated to the United States. and continued to play/write/teach chess proactively at his adopted homeland.

He started the FIDE Committee on Chess Art and Exhibition.

Gufeld was one of the most prolific authors in all of chess, writing over 80 chess books. His proudest achievements, however, were his win with the King's Indian Defence, Sämisch Variation against Vladimir Bagirov, which he called his "Mona Lisa"; and his 1967 win over Vasily Smyslov (see below). The first of these games made it into John Nunn's collection of the hundred greatest games of all time, Mammoth Book of the World's Greatest Chess Games, and the 112-game collection that followed it. Gufeld beat Smyslov again in 1975.

He used to say to those who laughed at his English: "I think that my English is better than your Russian!"

== Death ==
In September 2002, Gufeld suffered a stroke and heart attack. He was unable to speak or walk and appeared to be in a state of obtundedness; not comatose and nearly stuporous. He died two weeks later at the age of 66 in the Cedars-Sinai Medical Center in Los Angeles. He is interred in the Hollywood Forever Cemetery in Hollywood, California.

== Notable games ==
Smyslov vs. Gufeld, Moscow 1967

Position: e1 white king, d1 white rook, h2 white pawn, g3 white pawn, c3 black queen, f4 white pawn, c4 white bishop, a4 white pawn, a5 black pawn, g6 black pawn, f6 black pawn, e6 black pawn, h7 black pawn, g7 black king, d7 white knight

Final position

Here is Gufeld's 1967 win over Smyslov:

Vasily Smyslov vs. Gufeld; Spartakiade, Moscow 1967
1.c4 Nf6 2.Nf3 g6 3.b4 Bg7 4.Bb2 0-0 5.e3 b6 6.d4 c5 7.dxc5 bxc5 8.b5 a6 9.a4 Ne4 10.Bxg7 Kxg7 11.Qd5 Qa5+ 12.Ke2 Bb7 13.Qxb7 Nc6 14.Nfd2 Ra7 15.bxc6 Rxb7 16.cxb7 Qb4 17.Nxe4 Qb2+ 18.Nbd2 Qxa1 19.Nxc5 Rb8 20.g3 Qa3 21.Nxd7 Rxb7 22.Bh3 Qd6 23.c5 Qd5 24.f3 Rb2 25.Rd1 e6 26.c6 Qc4+ 27.Ke1 Qd3 28.Bf1 Qxe3+ 29.Be2 a5 30.f4 f6 31.c7 Rc2 32.Kf1 Rxc7 33.Nc4 Rxc4 34.Bxc4 Qf3+ 35.Ke1 Qc3+ 0–1

== Books ==
- Exploiting Small Advantages, Batsford, 1985. 2003 reprint: ISBN 978-0-7134-8648-3.
- The Sicilian for the Tournament Player, Batsford, 1989. ISBN 0-7134-6167-5.
- My Life in Chess, Intl Chess Enterprises, 1993. ISBN 1-879479-21-4.
- Stetsko, Oleg (1994). Winning With the Torre Attack. H. Holt. ISBN 0805032800.
- The Modern French Tarrasch, Cadogan, 1996. ISBN 1-85744-103-6.
- with Oleg Stesko: The Giuoco Piano, Batsford, 1996. ISBN 978-0713478020.
- with Eric Schiller: Secrets Of The Sicilian Dragon, Cardoza, 1998. ISBN 0-940685-92-2.
- Leonid Stein: Master of Risk Strategy, Thinkers Press, 2000. ISBN 0-938650-54-8.
- with Eric Schiller: Secrets Of The King's Indian (Cardoza Publishing's Essential Opening Repertoire Series), Cardoza, 2000. ISBN 1-58042-017-6.
- Chess: The Search for Mona Lisa, Batsford, 2001. ISBN 0-7134-8477-2.
- Bobby Fischer: From Chess Genius to Legend, Thinkers Press, 2003. ISBN 978-0-938650-84-3.
- Chess Strategy, Batsford, 2003. ISBN 0-7134-8775-5.
- The Art of the King's Indian, Batsford, 2003. ISBN 978-0-7134-8661-2.

== See also ==
- List of Jewish chess players
