= Vladimir Bagirov =

Latvian chess grandmaster (1936–2000)

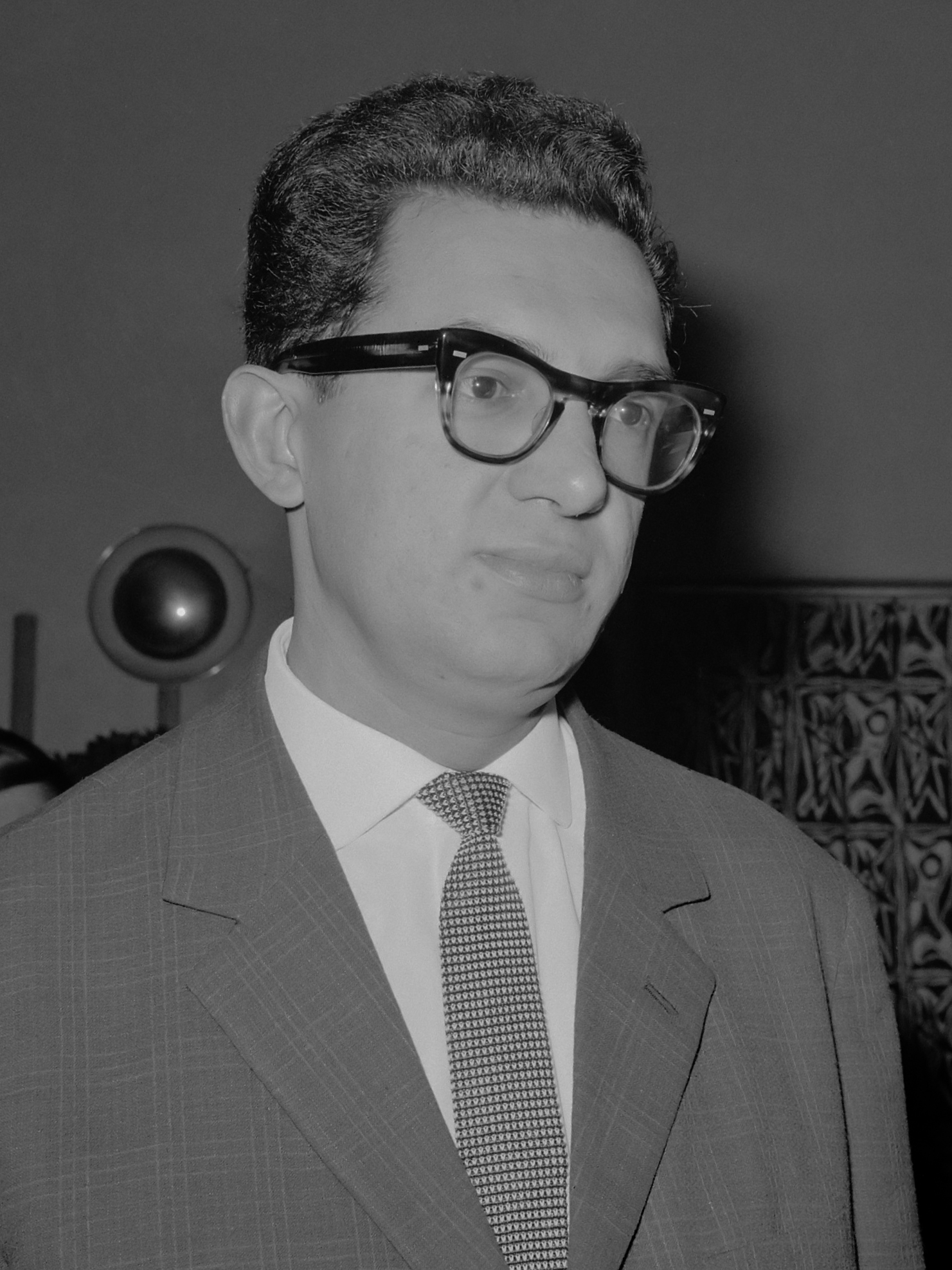
- Bagirov in 1965

Personal information
- Born: Vladimir Konstantinovich Bagirov; 16 August 1936 Baku, Azerbaijan SSR; Soviet Union
- Died: 21 July 2000 (aged 63) Jyväskylä, Finland

Chess career
- Country: Soviet Union → Latvia
- Title: Grandmaster (1978)
- Peak rating: 2545 (January 1979)
- Peak ranking: No. 30 (January 1980)

Vladimir Konstantinovich Bagirov (Russian: Влади́мир Константи́нович Баги́ров; Latvian: Vladimirs Konstantinovičs Bagirovs; August 16, 1936 – July 21, 2000) was a Soviet-Latvian chess player, author, and trainer. He played in ten USSR Championships, with his best result being fourth place in his debut in 1960. Bagirov was world senior champion in 1998.

He was the coach of Mikhail Tal and Garry Kasparov, both of whom are considered to be among the greatest chess players of all time.

== Biography ==
Vladimir Bagirov was born to an Armenian father and a Ukrainian mother in Baku. He showed chess talent as a youth, and came under the wing of the master and trainer Vladimir Makogonov. He made his debut in the semi-finals of the Soviet Championship in 1957, but did not advance to the final. Bagirov qualified for the final for the first time in 1960, and finished in 4th place at the 27th USSR Championship in Leningrad, which was won by Viktor Korchnoi.

In 1961, he was selected to play for the Soviet team in the European Team Championship at Oberhausen 1961 and at the World Student Championship in Helsinki. Bagirov was awarded the title of International Master by FIDE in 1963 and that of Grandmaster in 1978.

Bagirov moved into training work in the 1970s, and for a short time in 1975, as Azerbaijan national coach, was the sole trainer of future world champion Garry Kasparov. Following a dispute with chess officials, Bagirov moved to Latvia in the late 1970s, and coached former world champion Mikhail Tal, and future grandmasters Alexei Shirov and Alexander Shabalov.

Bagirov was also an openings theoretician, with one of his favourites the uncommon Alekhine's Defence. He published two books and a CD-Rom from 1994 to 2000.

Following the collapse of the Soviet Union in 1991, Bagirov played more tournament chess than he ever had before, taking part in many open tournaments in Europe. He won the 1998 World Senior Championship at Grieskirchen, Austria, with a score of 8½/11.

Bagirov played for Latvia in Chess Olympiads:

- In 1992, at fourth board in the 30th Chess Olympiad in Manila (+1−1=6);
- In 1996, at third board in the 32nd Chess Olympiad in Yerevan (+3−2=3).

Bagirov played for Latvia in European Team Chess Championships:

- In 1992, at second board in the 10th European Team Chess Championship in Debrecen (+1−1=4).

Bagirov played for Latvia in World Team Chess Championships:

- In 1993, at fourth board in the 3rd World Team Chess Championship in Lucerne (+0−0=5).

Bagirov died while playing a tournament in Finland in 2000. He had started the Heart of Finland Open event with three straight wins to take the lead and, after a time scramble, had an extra pawn in round four against Teemu Laasanen, but suffered a heart attack, and died the next day, on July 21, 2000.

== Publications ==
- English Opening: Classical and Indian, by Vladimir Bagirov, translated from the Russian by Ken Neat, London, Cadogan Chess, 1994, ISBN 1-85744-033-1.
- English Opening: Symmetrical, by Vladimir Bagirov, translated from the Russian by Ken Neat, London, Cadogan Chess, 1995, ISBN 1-85744-032-3.
- Queen's Gambit Declined, Exchange Variation, CD-Rom by Vladimir Bagirov, Amsterdam, New In Chess, 2000.

== Notable games ==
- Leonid Stein vs. Vladimir Bagirov, Leningrad 1963, French Defense: Tarrasch, Closed Variation (C05), 0–1
- Vladimir Bagirov vs. Karen Ashotovich Grigorian, URS 1976, Nimzo–Larsen Attack: Indian Variation (A01), 1–0
- Vladimir Bagirov vs. Mark Taimanov, URS 1977, Queen's Gambit Declined: Barmen Variation (D37), 1–0
