= English Attack =

English Attack can refer to:

== Chess openings ==
- Sicilian Defence, Najdorf Variation (1. e4 c5 2. Nf3 d6 3. d4 cxd4 4. Nxd4 Nf6 5. Nc3 a6 6. Be3)
- Sicilian Defence, Scheveningen Variation (1. e4 c5 2. Nf3 d6 3. d4 cxd4 4. Nxd4 Nf6 5. Nc3 e6 6. Be3 a6 7. Qd2 or 7.f3)

== Military battles ==
- Battle of Quebec (1690)
- Attack on Mers-el-Kébir
