= B89 =

B89 may refer to:

- Sicilian Defence, Scheveningen Variation, according to the list of chess openings
- Bundesstraße 89, a German road; see Bundesautobahn 71
