= Poisoned Pawn Variation =

Chess opening theme

The Poisoned Pawn Variation is any of several series of opening moves in chess in which a pawn is said to be "poisoned" because its capture can result in a positional loss of time or a loss of material. This commonly refers to a capture of the b-pawn by the queen, especially by Black.

== Sicilian Defense, Najdorf ==
Poisoned Pawn Variation
Position: a8 black rook, b8 black knight, c8 black bishop, e8 black king, f8 black bishop, h8 black rook, b7 black pawn, f7 black pawn, g7 black pawn, h7 black pawn, a6 black pawn, d6 black pawn, e6 black pawn, f6 black knight, g5 white bishop, d4 white knight, e4 white pawn, f4 white pawn, c3 white knight, a2 white pawn, b2 black queen, c2 white pawn, d2 white queen, g2 white pawn, h2 white pawn, a1 white rook, e1 white king, f1 white bishop, h1 white rook
- Moves: 1.e4 c5 2.Nf3 d6 3.d4 cxd4 4.Nxd4 Nf6 5.Nc3 a6 6.Bg5 e6 7.f4 Qb6 8.Qd2 Qxb2
- ECO: B97
- Parent: Sicilian Defense, Najdorf Variation

The best known of these, called the Poisoned Pawn Variation, is a line of the Najdorf Variation of the Sicilian Defense that begins with the moves:

1. e4 c5
2. Nf3 d6
3. d4 cxd4
4. Nxd4 Nf6
5. Nc3 a6
6. Bg5 e6
7. f4 Qb6

after which 8.Qd2 Qxb2 usually follows, accepting the "poisoned" b2-pawn. White can also play 8.Nb3, protecting the pawn. 8.a3 is another viable option, as it sets up a deadly trap where 8...Qxb2?? would be met with 9.Na4!, trapping the black queen.

One of the pioneers of this line was David Bronstein, who tied the 1951 World Championship match against Mikhail Botvinnik 12–12. Bobby Fischer later became a proponent, playing it with great success.

The line was most famously played in game 7 and game 11 of the 1972 World Chess Championship match between Fischer and Spassky. In both games Fischer played Black and grabbed the pawn. In the first, he reached a secure position with a comfortable material advantage but only secured a draw. In the second, Spassky surprised Fischer with a theoretical novelty and won the game after Fischer defended poorly, allowing Spassky to trap Fischer's queen and handing Fischer his only loss in the Poisoned Pawn Variation.

The line was later taken up successfully by other leading players, including world champions Garry Kasparov, Viswanathan Anand, and Anatoly Karpov. It remains one of the most theoretically important variations of the Sicilian Defense. In recent times, the line has become a popular battleground in computer chess, with operators trying to "out-book" each other by going progressively deeper into the different poisoned pawn lines. As a result, the line is extremely well researched. Writing in 2010, FM Graham Burgess commented that current theory suggests that the b2-pawn is "not too heavily laced with arsenic", but that it would be suicidal to enter the line without specialist knowledge.

== French Defense, Winawer ==
A Poisoned Pawn Variation also exists in the French Defence, Winawer: 1.e4 e6 2.d4 d5 3.Nc3 Bb4 4.e5 c5 5.a3 Bxc3+ 6.bxc3 Ne7 7.Qg4 Qc7 8.Qxg7 Rg8 9.Qxh7 cxd4 10.Ne2 Nbc6 (or 10.Kd1 Nd7). Like the Poisoned Pawn Variation in the Sicilian Najdorf, this line gives significant weaknesses for both sides and can lead to highly complex lines. White can attack on the kingside and try to exploit the passed h-pawn, while Black destroys the centre.

== Latvian Gambit ==
There is also a Poisoned Pawn Variation in the Latvian Gambit: 1.e4 e5 2.Nf3 f5 3.Bc4 fxe4 4.Nxe5 Qg5?! This variation leads to extremely sharp play, is considered rather dubious, and is thus rarely seen today. However, Burgess states that it "is not utterly, clearly bad".

== London System ==
Within the London System, the Poisoned Pawn Variation follows after: 1.d4 d5 2.Nf3 Nf6 3.Bf4 c5 4.e3 Qb6 5.Nc3 Qxb2?! Black is lost after 6.Nb5 Na6 7.a3 Bf5 8.dxc5 Bxc2 9.Qc1 Qxc1+ 10.Rxc1 and the c-pawn is too strong.

== Trompowsky Attack ==
The Poisoned Pawn Variation of the Trompowsky Attack goes 1.d4 Nf6 2.Bg5 c5 3.d5 Qb6 4.Nc3. The continuation 4...Qxb2 5.Bd2 Qb6 is the Chepukaitis Gambit.

== Use in popular culture ==
A poisoned pawn variation was used in the Monk episode "Mr. Monk and the Genius".

== See also ==
- List of chess openings
