= List of ECO codes =

List of codes used to classify chess openings

This is a list of the codes used to classify chess openings in the Encyclopaedia of Chess Openings. The five-volume encyclopaedia was first published by Chess Informant between 1974 and 1979, under the editorship of Aleksandar Matanović. The moves given below are primarily those found in the first edition. Subsequent editions have introduced some changes, and this is indicated where appropriate.

== ECO codes ==
Code	Moves	Main article
A (↑)		
A00	Moves other than 1.e4, 1.d4, 1.Nf3, 1.c4, 1.b3, and 1.f4	Irregular openings
A01	1.b3	Nimzowitsch–Larsen Attack
A02	1.f4	Bird Opening
A03	1.f4 d5	
A04	1.Nf3	Zukertort Opening
A05	1.Nf3 Nf6	
A06	1.Nf3 d5	
A07	1.Nf3 d5 2.g3	
A08	1.Nf3 d5 2.g3 c5 3.Bg2; 1.Nf3 d5 2.g3 c5	
A09	1.Nf3 d5 2.c4	Réti Opening
A10	1.c4	English Opening
A11	1.c4 c6	
A12	1.c4 c6 2.Nf3 d5 3.b3	
A13	1.c4 e6	
A14	1.c4 e6 2.Nf3 d5 3.g3 Nf6 4.Bg2 Be7 5.0-0; 1.c4 e6 2.Nf3 d5 3.g3 Nf6 4.Bg2 Be7	
A15	1.c4 Nf6	
A16	1.c4 Nf6 2.Nc3	
A17	1.c4 Nf6 2.Nc3 e6	
A18	1.c4 Nf6 2.Nc3 e6 3.e4	
A19	1.c4 Nf6 2.Nc3 e6 3.e4 c5	
A20	1.c4 e5	Reversed Sicilian
A21	1.c4 e5 2.Nc3	
A22	1.c4 e5 2.Nc3 Nf6	
A23	1.c4 e5 2.Nc3 Nf6 3.g3 c6	
A24	1.c4 e5 2.Nc3 Nf6 3.g3 g6	
A25	1.c4 e5 2.Nc3 Nc6	
A26	1.c4 e5 2.Nc3 Nc6 3.g3 g6 4.Bg2 Bg7 5.d3 d6 1.c4 e5 2.Nc3 Nc6 3.g3 g6 4.Bg2 Bg7 5.d3	
A27	1.c4 e5 2.Nc3 Nc6 3.Nf3	
A28	1.c4 e5 2.Nc3 Nc6 3.Nf3 Nf6	
A29	1.c4 e5 2.Nc3 Nc6 3.Nf3 Nf6 4.g3	
A30	1.c4 c5	Symmetrical English
A31	1.c4 c5 2.Nf3 Nf6 3.d4	
A32	1.c4 c5 2.Nf3 Nf6 3.d4 cxd4 4.Nxd4 e6	
A33	1.c4 c5 2.Nf3 Nf6 3.d4 cxd4 4.Nxd4 e6 5.Nc3 Nc6	
A34	1.c4 c5 2.Nc3	
A35	1.c4 c5 2.Nc3 Nc6	
A36	1.c4 c5 2.Nc3 Nc6 3.g3	
A37	1.c4 c5 2.Nc3 Nc6 3.g3 g6 4.Bg2 Bg7 5.Nf3	
A38	1.c4 c5 2.Nc3 Nc6 3.g3 g6 4.Bg2 Bg7 5.Nf3 Nf6	
A39	1.c4 c5 2.Nc3 Nc6 3.g3 g6 4.Bg2 Bg7 5.Nf3 Nf6 6.0-0 0-0 7.d4	
A40	1.d4	Queen's Pawn Game
A41	1.d4 d6	
A42	1.d4 d6 2.c4 g6 3.Nc3 Bg7 4.e4 1.d4 d6 2.c4	
A43	1.d4 c5	Benoni Defence
A44	1.d4 c5 2.d5 e5	
A45	1.d4 Nf6	Indian Defence
A46	1.d4 Nf6 2.Nf3	
A47	1.d4 Nf6 2.Nf3 b6	
A48	1.d4 Nf6 2.Nf3 g6	
A49	1.d4 Nf6 2.Nf3 g6 3.g3	
A50	1.d4 Nf6 2.c4 b6 1.d4 Nf6 2.c4	
A51	1.d4 Nf6 2.c4 e5	Budapest Gambit
A52	1.d4 Nf6 2.c4 e5 3.dxe5 Ng4	
A53	1.d4 Nf6 2.c4 d6	Old Indian Defence
A54	1.d4 Nf6 2.c4 d6 3.Nc3 e5 4.Nf3	
A55	1.d4 Nf6 2.c4 d6 3.Nc3 e5 4.Nf3 Nbd7 5.e4	
A56	1.d4 Nf6 2.c4 c5	
A57	1.d4 Nf6 2.c4 c5 3.d5 b5	Benko Gambit
A58	1.d4 Nf6 2.c4 c5 3.d5 b5 4.cxb5 a6 5.bxa6	
A59	1.d4 Nf6 2.c4 c5 3.d5 b5 4.cxb5 a6 5.bxa6 Bxa6 6.Nc3 d6 7.e4	
A60	1.d4 Nf6 2.c4 c5 3.d5 e6	Modern Benoni
A61	1.d4 Nf6 2.c4 c5 3.d5 e6 4.Nc3 exd5 5.cxd5 d6 6.Nf3 g6 1.d4 Nf6 2.c4 c5 3.d5 e6 4.Nc3	
A62	1.d4 Nf6 2.c4 c5 3.d5 e6 4.Nc3 exd5 5.cxd5 d6 6.Nf3 g6 7.g3 Bg7 8.Bg2 0-0; 1.d4 Nf6 2.c4 c5 3.d5 e6 4.Nc3 exd5 5.cxd5 d6 6.Nf3 g6 7.g3	
A63	1.d4 Nf6 2.c4 c5 3.d5 e6 4.Nc3 exd5 5.cxd5 d6 6.Nf3 g6 7.g3 Bg7 8.Bg2 0-0 9.0-0 Nbd7; 1.d4 Nf6 2.c4 c5 3.d5 e6 4.Nc3 exd5 5.cxd5 d6 6.Nf3 g6 7.g3 Bg7 8.Bg2 0-0 9.0-0 a6	
A64	1.d4 Nf6 2.c4 c5 3.d5 e6 4.Nc3 exd5 5.cxd5 d6 6.Nf3 g6 7.g3 Bg7 8.Bg2 0-0 9.0-0 Nbd7 10.Nd2 a6 11.a4 Re8; 1.d4 Nf6 2.c4 c5 3.d5 e6 4.Nc3 exd5 5.cxd5 d6 6.Nf3 g6 7.g3 Bg7 8.Bg2 0-0 9.0-0 a6 10.a4 Nbd7 11.Nd2	
A65	1.d4 Nf6 2.c4 c5 3.d5 e6 4.Nc3 exd5 5.cxd5 d6 6.e4	
A66	1.d4 Nf6 2.c4 c5 3.d5 e6 4.Nc3 exd5 5.cxd5 d6 6.e4 g6 7.f4	
A67	1.d4 Nf6 2.c4 c5 3.d5 e6 4.Nc3 exd5 5.cxd5 d6 6.e4 g6 7.f4 Bg7 8.Bb5+	
A68	1.d4 Nf6 2.c4 c5 3.d5 e6 4.Nc3 exd5 5.cxd5 d6 6.e4 g6 7.f4 Bg7 8.Nf3 0-0; 1.d4 Nf6 2.c4 c5 3.d5 e6 4.Nc3 exd5 5.cxd5 d6 6.e4 g6 7.f4 Bg7 8.Nf3	
A69	1.d4 Nf6 2.c4 c5 3.d5 e6 4.Nc3 exd5 5.cxd5 d6 6.e4 g6 7.f4 Bg7 8.Nf3 0-0 9.Be2 Re8	
A70	1.d4 Nf6 2.c4 c5 3.d5 e6 4.Nc3 exd5 5.cxd5 d6 6.e4 g6 7.Nf3	
A71	1.d4 Nf6 2.c4 c5 3.d5 e6 4.Nc3 exd5 5.cxd5 d6 6.e4 g6 7.Nf3 Bg7 8.Bg5	
A72	1.d4 Nf6 2.c4 c5 3.d5 e6 4.Nc3 exd5 5.cxd5 d6 6.e4 g6 7.Nf3 Bg7 8.Be2 0-0; 1.d4 Nf6 2.c4 c5 3.d5 e6 4.Nc3 exd5 5.cxd5 d6 6.e4 g6 7.Nf3 Bg7 8.Be2	
A73	1.d4 Nf6 2.c4 c5 3.d5 e6 4.Nc3 exd5 5.cxd5 d6 6.e4 g6 7.Nf3 Bg7 8.Be2 0-0 9.0-0	
A74	1.d4 Nf6 2.c4 c5 3.d5 e6 4.Nc3 exd5 5.cxd5 d6 6.e4 g6 7.Nf3 Bg7 8.Be2 0-0 9.0-0 a6 10.a4 1.d4 Nf6 2.c4 c5 3.d5 e6 4.Nc3 exd5 5.cxd5 d6 6.e4 g6 7.Nf3 Bg7 8.Be2 0-0 9.0-0 a6	
A75	1.d4 Nf6 2.c4 c5 3.d5 e6 4.Nc3 exd5 5.cxd5 d6 6.e4 g6 7.Nf3 Bg7 8.Be2 0-0 9.0-0 a6 10.a4 Bg4	
A76	1.d4 Nf6 2.c4 c5 3.d5 e6 4.Nc3 exd5 5.cxd5 d6 6.e4 g6 7.Nf3 Bg7 8.Be2 0-0 9.0-0 Re8	
A77	1.d4 Nf6 2.c4 c5 3.d5 e6 4.Nc3 exd5 5.cxd5 d6 6.e4 g6 7.Nf3 Bg7 8.Be2 0-0 9.0-0 Re8 10.Nd2	
A78	1.d4 Nf6 2.c4 c5 3.d5 e6 4.Nc3 exd5 5.cxd5 d6 6.e4 g6 7.Nf3 Bg7 8.Be2 0-0 9.0-0 Re8 10.Nd2 Na6	
A79	1.d4 Nf6 2.c4 c5 3.d5 e6 4.Nc3 exd5 5.cxd5 d6 6.e4 g6 7.Nf3 Bg7 8.Be2 0-0 9.0-0 Re8 10.Nd2 Na6 11.f3 Nc7; 1.d4 Nf6 2.c4 c5 3.d5 e6 4.Nc3 exd5 5.cxd5 d6 6.e4 g6 7.Nf3 Bg7 8.Be2 0-0 9.0-0 Re8 10.Nd2 Na6 11.f3	
A80	1.d4 f5	Dutch Defence
A81	1.d4 f5 2.g3	
A82	1.d4 f5 2.e4	Staunton Gambit
A83	1.d4 f5 2.e4 fxe4 3.Nc3 Nf6 4.Bg5	
A84	1.d4 f5 2.c4	
A85	1.d4 f5 2.c4 Nf6 3.Nc3	
A86	1.d4 f5 2.c4 Nf6 3.g3	
A87	1.d4 f5 2.c4 Nf6 3.g3 g6 4.Bg2 Bg7 5.Nf3	
A88	1.d4 f5 2.c4 Nf6 3.g3 g6 4.Bg2 Bg7 5.Nf3 0-0 6.0-0 d6 7.Nc3 c6	
A89	1.d4 f5 2.c4 Nf6 3.g3 g6 4.Bg2 Bg7 5.Nf3 0-0 6.0-0 d6 7.Nc3 Nc6	
A90	1.d4 f5 2.c4 Nf6 3.g3 e6 4.Bg2; 1.d4 f5 2.c4 Nf6 3.g3 e6	
A91	1.d4 f5 2.c4 Nf6 3.g3 e6 4.Bg2 Be7	
A92	1.d4 f5 2.c4 Nf6 3.g3 e6 4.Bg2 Be7 5.Nf3 0-0	
A93	1.d4 f5 2.c4 Nf6 3.g3 e6 4.Bg2 Be7 5.Nf3 0-0 6.0-0 d5 7.b3	
A94	1.d4 f5 2.c4 Nf6 3.g3 e6 4.Bg2 Be7 5.Nf3 0-0 6.0-0 d5 7.b3 c6 8.Ba3; 1.d4 f5 2.c4 Nf6 3.g3 e6 4.Bg2 Be7 5.Nf3 0-0 6.0-0 d5 7.b3 c6	
A95	1.d4 f5 2.c4 Nf6 3.g3 e6 4.Bg2 Be7 5.Nf3 0-0 6.0-0 d5 7.Nc3 c6 1.d4 f5 2.c4 Nf6 3.g3 e6 4.Bg2 Be7 5.Nf3 0-0 6.0-0 d5 7.Nc3	
A96	1.d4 f5 2.c4 Nf6 3.g3 e6 4.Bg2 Be7 5.Nf3 0-0 6.0-0 d6	
A97	1.d4 f5 2.c4 Nf6 3.g3 e6 4.Bg2 Be7 5.Nf3 0-0 6.0-0 d6 7.Nc3 Qe8	
A98	1.d4 f5 2.c4 Nf6 3.g3 e6 4.Bg2 Be7 5.Nf3 0-0 6.0-0 d6 7.Nc3 Qe8 8.Qc2	
A99	1.d4 f5 2.c4 Nf6 3.g3 e6 4.Bg2 Be7 5.Nf3 0-0 6.0-0 d6 7.Nc3 Qe8 8.b3	
B (↑)		
B00	1.e4	King's Pawn Game
B01	1.e4 d5	Scandinavian Defence
B02	1.e4 Nf6	Alekhine Defence
B03	1.e4 Nf6 2.e5 Nd5 3.d4	
B04	1.e4 Nf6 2.e5 Nd5 3.d4 d6 4.Nf3	
B05	1.e4 Nf6 2.e5 Nd5 3.d4 d6 4.Nf3 Bg4	
B06	1.e4 g6	Modern Defence
B07	1.e4 d6 2.d4 Nf6; 1.e4 d6	Pirc Defence
B08	1.e4 d6 2.d4 Nf6 3.Nc3 g6 4.Nf3 Bg7; 1.e4 d6 2.d4 Nf6 3.Nc3 g6 4.Nf3	
B09	1.e4 d6 2.d4 Nf6 3.Nc3 g6 4.f4 Bg7; 1.e4 d6 2.d4 Nf6 3.Nc3 g6 4.f4	
B10	1.e4 c6	Caro–Kann Defence
B11	1.e4 c6 2.Nf3 d5 3.Nc3 Bg4; 1.e4 c6 2.Nc3	
B12	1.e4 c6 2.d4	
B13	1.e4 c6 2.d4 d5 3.exd5 cxd5 1.e4 c6 2.d4 d5 3.exd5	
B14	1.e4 c6 2.d4 d5 3.exd5 cxd5 4.c4 Nf6 5.Nc3; 1.e4 c6 2.d4 d5 3.exd5 cxd5 4.c4 Nf6 5.Nc3 e6	
B15	1.e4 c6 2.d4 d5 3.Nc3	
B16	1.e4 c6 2.d4 d5 3.Nc3 dxe4 4.Nxe4 Nf6 5.Nxf6+ gxf6	
B17	1.e4 c6 2.d4 d5 3.Nc3 dxe4 4.Nxe4 Nd7	
B18	1.e4 c6 2.d4 d5 3.Nc3 dxe4 4.Nxe4 Bf5	
B19	1.e4 c6 2.d4 d5 3.Nc3 dxe4 4.Nxe4 Bf5 5.Ng3 Bg6 6.h4 h6 7.Nf3 Nd7; 1.e4 c6 2.d4 d5 3.Nc3 dxe4 4.Nxe4 Bf5 5.Ng3 Bg6 6.h4 h6 7.Nf3	
B20	1.e4 c5	Sicilian Defence
B21	1.e4 c5 2.f4 and 1.e4 c5 2.d4 1.e4 c5 2.f4	
B22	1.e4 c5 2.c3	Alapin Sicilian
B23	1.e4 c5 2.Nc3	Closed Sicilian
B24	1.e4 c5 2.Nc3 Nc6 3.g3	
B25	1.e4 c5 2.Nc3 Nc6 3.g3 g6 4.Bg2 Bg7 5.d3 d6	
B26	1.e4 c5 2.Nc3 Nc6 3.g3 g6 4.Bg2 Bg7 5.d3 d6 6.Be3	
B27	1.e4 c5 2.Nf3	
B28	1.e4 c5 2.Nf3 a6	
B29	1.e4 c5 2.Nf3 Nf6	
B30	1.e4 c5 2.Nf3 Nc6	
B31	1.e4 c5 2.Nf3 Nc6 3.Bb5 g6	
B32	1.e4 c5 2.Nf3 Nc6 3.d4	
B33	1.e4 c5 2.Nf3 Nc6 3.d4 cxd4 4.Nxd4 Nf6	
B34	1.e4 c5 2.Nf3 Nc6 3.d4 cxd4 4.Nxd4 g6	
B35	1.e4 c5 2.Nf3 Nc6 3.d4 cxd4 4.Nxd4 g6 5.Nc3 Bg7 6.Be3 Nf6 7.Bc4	
B36	1.e4 c5 2.Nf3 Nc6 3.d4 cxd4 4.Nxd4 g6 5.c4	
B37	1.e4 c5 2.Nf3 Nc6 3.d4 cxd4 4.Nxd4 g6 5.c4 Bg7	
B38	1.e4 c5 2.Nf3 Nc6 3.d4 cxd4 4.Nxd4 g6 5.c4 Bg7 6.Be3	
B39	1.e4 c5 2.Nf3 Nc6 3.d4 cxd4 4.Nxd4 g6 5.c4 Bg7 6.Be3 Nf6 7.Nc3 Ng4	
B40	1.e4 c5 2.Nf3 e6	
B41	1.e4 c5 2.Nf3 e6 3.d4 cxd4 4.Nxd4 a6 1.e4 c5 2.Nf3 e6 3.d4	
B42	1.e4 c5 2.Nf3 e6 3.d4 cxd4 4.Nxd4 a6 5.Bd3	
B43	1.e4 c5 2.Nf3 e6 3.d4 cxd4 4.Nxd4 a6 5.Nc3	
B44	1.e4 c5 2.Nf3 e6 3.d4 cxd4 4.Nxd4 Nc6	
B45	1.e4 c5 2.Nf3 e6 3.d4 cxd4 4.Nxd4 Nc6 5.Nc3	
B46	1.e4 c5 2.Nf3 e6 3.d4 cxd4 4.Nxd4 Nc6 5.Nc3 a6	
B47	1.e4 c5 2.Nf3 e6 3.d4 cxd4 4.Nxd4 Nc6 5.Nc3 Qc7	
B48	1.e4 c5 2.Nf3 e6 3.d4 cxd4 4.Nxd4 Nc6 5.Nc3 Qc7 6.Be3	
B49	1.e4 c5 2.Nf3 e6 3.d4 cxd4 4.Nxd4 Nc6 5.Nc3 Qc7 6.Be3 a6 7.Be2	
B50	1.e4 c5 2.Nf3 d6	
B51	1.e4 c5 2.Nf3 d6 3.Bb5+	
B52	1.e4 c5 2.Nf3 d6 3.Bb5+ Bd7	
B53	1.e4 c5 2.Nf3 d6 3.d4 cxd4 4.Qxd4; 1.e4 c5 2.Nf3 d6 3.d4	Chekhover Sicilian
B54	1.e4 c5 2.Nf3 d6 3.d4 cxd4 4.Nxd4	
B55	1.e4 c5 2.Nf3 d6 3.d4 cxd4 4.Nxd4 Nf6 5.f3 e5 6.Bb5+ 1.e4 c5 2.Nf3 d6 3.d4 cxd4 4.Nxd4 Nf6	
B56	1.e4 c5 2.Nf3 d6 3.d4 cxd4 4.Nxd4 Nf6 5.Nc3	
B57	1.e4 c5 2.Nf3 d6 3.d4 cxd4 4.Nxd4 Nf6 5.Nc3 Nc6 6.Bc4	
B58	1.e4 c5 2.Nf3 d6 3.d4 cxd4 4.Nxd4 Nf6 5.Nc3 Nc6 6.Be2	
B59	1.e4 c5 2.Nf3 d6 3.d4 cxd4 4.Nxd4 Nf6 5.Nc3 Nc6 6.Be2 e5 7.Nb3	
B60	1.e4 c5 2.Nf3 d6 3.d4 cxd4 4.Nxd4 Nf6 5.Nc3 Nc6 6.Bg5	
B61	1.e4 c5 2.Nf3 d6 3.d4 cxd4 4.Nxd4 Nf6 5.Nc3 Nc6 6.Bg5 Bd7 7.Qd2	
B62	1.e4 c5 2.Nf3 d6 3.d4 cxd4 4.Nxd4 Nf6 5.Nc3 Nc6 6.Bg5 e6	
B63	1.e4 c5 2.Nf3 d6 3.d4 cxd4 4.Nxd4 Nf6 5.Nc3 Nc6 6.Bg5 e6 7.Qd2	
B64	1.e4 c5 2.Nf3 d6 3.d4 cxd4 4.Nxd4 Nf6 5.Nc3 Nc6 6.Bg5 e6 7.Qd2 Be7 8.0-0-0 0-0 9.f4	
B65	1.e4 c5 2.Nf3 d6 3.d4 cxd4 4.Nxd4 Nf6 5.Nc3 Nc6 6.Bg5 e6 7.Qd2 Be7 8.0-0-0 0-0 9.f4 Nxd4 10.Qxd4	
B66	1.e4 c5 2.Nf3 d6 3.d4 cxd4 4.Nxd4 Nf6 5.Nc3 Nc6 6.Bg5 e6 7.Qd2 a6	
B67	1.e4 c5 2.Nf3 d6 3.d4 cxd4 4.Nxd4 Nf6 5.Nc3 Nc6 6.Bg5 e6 7.Qd2 a6 8.0-0-0 Bd7	
B68	1.e4 c5 2.Nf3 d6 3.d4 cxd4 4.Nxd4 Nf6 5.Nc3 Nc6 6.Bg5 e6 7.Qd2 a6 8.0-0-0 Bd7 9.f4 Be7	
B69	1.e4 c5 2.Nf3 d6 3.d4 cxd4 4.Nxd4 Nf6 5.Nc3 Nc6 6.Bg5 e6 7.Qd2 a6 8.0-0-0 Bd7 9.f4 Be7 10.Nf3 b5 11.Bxf6	
B70	1.e4 c5 2.Nf3 d6 3.d4 cxd4 4.Nxd4 Nf6 5.Nc3 g6	Dragon Sicilian
B71	1.e4 c5 2.Nf3 d6 3.d4 cxd4 4.Nxd4 Nf6 5.Nc3 g6 6.f4	
B72	1.e4 c5 2.Nf3 d6 3.d4 cxd4 4.Nxd4 Nf6 5.Nc3 g6 6.Be3	
B73	1.e4 c5 2.Nf3 d6 3.d4 cxd4 4.Nxd4 Nf6 5.Nc3 g6 6.Be3 Bg7 7.Be2 Nc6 8.0-0	
B74	1.e4 c5 2.Nf3 d6 3.d4 cxd4 4.Nxd4 Nf6 5.Nc3 g6 6.Be3 Bg7 7.Be2 Nc6 8.0-0 0-0 9.Nb3	
B75	1.e4 c5 2.Nf3 d6 3.d4 cxd4 4.Nxd4 Nf6 5.Nc3 g6 6.Be3 Bg7 7.f3	
B76	1.e4 c5 2.Nf3 d6 3.d4 cxd4 4.Nxd4 Nf6 5.Nc3 g6 6.Be3 Bg7 7.f3 0-0	
B77	1.e4 c5 2.Nf3 d6 3.d4 cxd4 4.Nxd4 Nf6 5.Nc3 g6 6.Be3 Bg7 7.f3 0-0 8.Qd2 Nc6 9.Bc4	
B78	1.e4 c5 2.Nf3 d6 3.d4 cxd4 4.Nxd4 Nf6 5.Nc3 g6 6.Be3 Bg7 7.f3 0-0 8.Qd2 Nc6 9.Bc4 Bd7 10.0-0-0	
B79	1.e4 c5 2.Nf3 d6 3.d4 cxd4 4.Nxd4 Nf6 5.Nc3 g6 6.Be3 Bg7 7.f3 0-0 8.Qd2 Nc6 9.Bc4 Bd7 10.0-0-0 Qa5 11.Bb3 Rfc8 12.h4 1.e4 c5 2.Nf3 d6 3.d4 cxd4 4.Nxd4 Nf6 5.Nc3 g6 6.Be3 Bg7 7.f3 0-0 8.Qd2 Nc6 9.Bc4 Bd7 10.0-0-0 Qa5	
B80	1.e4 c5 2.Nf3 d6 3.d4 cxd4 4.Nxd4 Nf6 5.Nc3 e6	Scheveningen Sicilian
B81	1.e4 c5 2.Nf3 d6 3.d4 cxd4 4.Nxd4 Nf6 5.Nc3 e6 6.g4	
B82	1.e4 c5 2.Nf3 d6 3.d4 cxd4 4.Nxd4 Nf6 5.Nc3 e6 6.f4	
B83	1.e4 c5 2.Nf3 d6 3.d4 cxd4 4.Nxd4 Nf6 5.Nc3 e6 6.Be2	
B84	1.e4 c5 2.Nf3 d6 3.d4 cxd4 4.Nxd4 Nf6 5.Nc3 e6 6.Be2 a6	
B85	1.e4 c5 2.Nf3 d6 3.d4 cxd4 4.Nxd4 Nf6 5.Nc3 e6 6.Be2 a6 7.0-0 Qc7 8.f4 Nc6; 1.e4 c5 2.Nf3 d6 3.d4 cxd4 4.Nxd4 Nf6 5.Nc3 e6 6.Be2 a6 7.0-0	
B86	1.e4 c5 2.Nf3 d6 3.d4 cxd4 4.Nxd4 Nf6 5.Nc3 e6 6.Bc4; 1.e4 c5 2.Nf3 d6 3.d4 cxd4 4.Nxd4 Nf6 5.Nc3 e6 6.Bc4	
B87	1.e4 c5 2.Nf3 d6 3.d4 cxd4 4.Nxd4 Nf6 5.Nc3 e6 6.Bc4 a6 7.Bb3 b5	
B88	1.e4 c5 2.Nf3 d6 3.d4 cxd4 4.Nxd4 Nf6 5.Nc3 e6 6.Bc4 Nc6	
B89	1.e4 c5 2.Nf3 d6 3.d4 cxd4 4.Nxd4 Nf6 5.Nc3 e6 6.Bc4 Nc6 7.Be3	
B90	1.e4 c5 2.Nf3 d6 3.d4 cxd4 4.Nxd4 Nf6 5.Nc3 a6	Najdorf Sicilian
B91	1.e4 c5 2.Nf3 d6 3.d4 cxd4 4.Nxd4 Nf6 5.Nc3 a6 6.g3	
B92	1.e4 c5 2.Nf3 d6 3.d4 cxd4 4.Nxd4 Nf6 5.Nc3 a6 6.Be2	
B93	1.e4 c5 2.Nf3 d6 3.d4 cxd4 4.Nxd4 Nf6 5.Nc3 a6 6.f4	
B94	1.e4 c5 2.Nf3 d6 3.d4 cxd4 4.Nxd4 Nf6 5.Nc3 a6 6.Bg5	
B95	1.e4 c5 2.Nf3 d6 3.d4 cxd4 4.Nxd4 Nf6 5.Nc3 a6 6.Bg5 e6	
B96	1.e4 c5 2.Nf3 d6 3.d4 cxd4 4.Nxd4 Nf6 5.Nc3 a6 6.Bg5 e6 7.f4	
B97	1.e4 c5 2.Nf3 d6 3.d4 cxd4 4.Nxd4 Nf6 5.Nc3 a6 6.Bg5 e6 7.f4 Qb6	Najdorf Sicilian, Poisoned Pawn Variation
B98	1.e4 c5 2.Nf3 d6 3.d4 cxd4 4.Nxd4 Nf6 5.Nc3 a6 6.Bg5 e6 7.f4 Be7	
B99	1.e4 c5 2.Nf3 d6 3.d4 cxd4 4.Nxd4 Nf6 5.Nc3 a6 6.Bg5 e6 7.f4 Be7 8.Qf3 Qc7 9.0-0-0 Nbd7	
C (↑)		
C00	1.e4 e6	French Defence
C01	1.e4 e6 2.d4 d5 3.exd5 exd5 1.e4 e6 2.d4	
C02	1.e4 e6 2.d4 d5 3.e5	French Defence, Advance Variation
C03	1.e4 e6 2.d4 d5 3.Nd2	French Defence, Tarrasch Variation
C04	1.e4 e6 2.d4 d5 3.Nd2 Nc6 4.Ngf3 Nf6; 1.e4 e6 2.d4 d5 3.Nd2 Nc6	
C05	1.e4 e6 2.d4 d5 3.Nd2 Nf6	
C06	1.e4 e6 2.d4 d5 3.Nd2 Nf6 4.e5 Nfd7 5.Bd3 c5 6.c3 Nc6 7.Ne2 cxd4 8.cxd4 1.e4 e6 2.d4 d5 3.Nd2 Nf6 4.e5 Nfd7 5.Bd3	
C07	1.e4 e6 2.d4 d5 3.Nd2 c5	
C08	1.e4 e6 2.d4 d5 3.Nd2 c5 4.exd5 exd5	
C09	1.e4 e6 2.d4 d5 3.Nd2 c5 4.exd5 exd5 5.Ngf3 Nc6	
C10	1.e4 e6 2.d4 d5 3.Nc3	
C11	1.e4 e6 2.d4 d5 3.Nc3 Nf6	French Defence, Classical Variation
C12	1.e4 e6 2.d4 d5 3.Nc3 Nf6 4.Bg5 Bb4; 1.e4 e6 2.d4 d5 3.Nc3 Nf6 4.Bg5	
C13	1.e4 e6 2.d4 d5 3.Nc3 Nf6 4.Bg5 Be7; 1.e4 e6 2.d4 d5 3.Nc3 Nf6 4.Bg5 dxe4	
C14	1.e4 e6 2.d4 d5 3.Nc3 Nf6 4.Bg5 Be7 5.e5 Nfd7 6.Bxe7 Qxe7; 1.e4 e6 2.d4 d5 3.Nc3 Nf6 4.Bg5 Be7	
C15	1.e4 e6 2.d4 d5 3.Nc3 Bb4	French Defence, Winawer Variation
C16	1.e4 e6 2.d4 d5 3.Nc3 Bb4 4.e5	
C17	1.e4 e6 2.d4 d5 3.Nc3 Bb4 4.e5 c5	
C18	1.e4 e6 2.d4 d5 3.Nc3 Bb4 4.e5 c5 5.a3 Bxc3+ 6.bxc3 1.e4 e6 2.d4 d5 3.Nc3 Bb4 4.e5 c5 5.a3	
C19	1.e4 e6 2.d4 d5 3.Nc3 Bb4 4.e5 c5 5.a3 Bxc3+ 6.bxc3 Ne7; 1.e4 e6 2.d4 d5 3.Nc3 Bb4 4.e5 c5 5.a3 Bxc3+ 6.bxc3 Ne7 7.Qg4	
C20	1.e4 e5	Open Game
C21	1.e4 e5 2.d4 exd4 1.e4 e5 2.d4	
C22	1.e4 e5 2.d4 exd4 3.Qxd4 Nc6; 1.e4 e5 2.d4 exd4 3.Qxd4	Centre Game
C23	1.e4 e5 2.Bc4	Bishop's Opening
C24	1.e4 e5 2.Bc4 Nf6	
C25	1.e4 e5 2.Nc3	Vienna Game
C26	1.e4 e5 2.Nc3 Nf6	
C27	1.e4 e5 2.Nc3 Nf6 3.Bc4 Nxe4; 1.e4 e5 2.Nc3 Nf6 3.Bc4	
C28	1.e4 e5 2.Nc3 Nf6 3.Bc4 Nc6	
C29	1.e4 e5 2.Nc3 Nf6 3.f4 d5 1.e4 e5 2.Nc3 Nf6 3.f4	
C30	1.e4 e5 2.f4	King's Gambit
C31	1.e4 e5 2.f4 d5	Falkbeer Countergambit
C32	1.e4 e5 2.f4 d5 3.exd5 e4 4.d3 Nf6; 1.e4 e5 2.f4 d5 3.exd5 e4	
C33	1.e4 e5 2.f4 exf4	
C34	1.e4 e5 2.f4 exf4 3.Nf3	
C35	1.e4 e5 2.f4 exf4 3.Nf3 Be7	
C36	1.e4 e5 2.f4 exf4 3.Nf3 d5	
C37	1.e4 e5 2.f4 exf4 3.Nf3 g5	
C38	1.e4 e5 2.f4 exf4 3.Nf3 g5 4.Bc4 Bg7	
C39	1.e4 e5 2.f4 exf4 3.Nf3 g5 4.h4	
C40	1.e4 e5 2.Nf3	King's Knight Opening
C41	1.e4 e5 2.Nf3 d6	Philidor Defence
C42	1.e4 e5 2.Nf3 Nf6	Petrov Defence
C43	1.e4 e5 2.Nf3 Nf6 3.d4	
C44	1.e4 e5 2.Nf3 Nc6	
C45	1.e4 e5 2.Nf3 Nc6 3.d4 exd4 4.Nxd4	Scotch Game
C46	1.e4 e5 2.Nf3 Nc6 3.Nc3	Three Knights Game
C47	1.e4 e5 2.Nf3 Nc6 3.Nc3 Nf6 4.d4 1.e4 e5 2.Nf3 Nc6 3.Nc3 Nf6	Four Knights Game, Scotch Variation
C48	1.e4 e5 2.Nf3 Nc6 3.Nc3 Nf6 4.Bb5	Four Knights Game, Spanish Variation
C49	1.e4 e5 2.Nf3 Nc6 3.Nc3 Nf6 4.Bb5 Bb4	
C50	1.e4 e5 2.Nf3 Nc6 3.Bc4	Italian Game
C51	1.e4 e5 2.Nf3 Nc6 3.Bc4 Bc5 4.b4	Evans Gambit
C52	1.e4 e5 2.Nf3 Nc6 3.Bc4 Bc5 4.b4 Bxb4 5.c3 Ba5	
C53	1.e4 e5 2.Nf3 Nc6 3.Bc4 Bc5 4.c3	
C54	1.e4 e5 2.Nf3 Nc6 3.Bc4 Bc5 4.c3 Nf6 5.d4 exd4 6.cxd4 1.e4 e5 2.Nf3 Nc6 3.Bc4 Bc5 4.c3 Nf6	
C55	1.e4 e5 2.Nf3 Nc6 3.Bc4 Nf6	Two Knights Defence
C56	1.e4 e5 2.Nf3 Nc6 3.Bc4 Nf6 4.d4 exd4 5.0-0 Nxe4; 1.e4 e5 2.Nf3 Nc6 3.Bc4 Nf6 4.d4	
C57	1.e4 e5 2.Nf3 Nc6 3.Bc4 Nf6 4.Ng5	
C58	1.e4 e5 2.Nf3 Nc6 3.Bc4 Nf6 4.Ng5 d5 5.exd5 Na5	
C59	1.e4 e5 2.Nf3 Nc6 3.Bc4 Nf6 4.Ng5 d5 5.exd5 Na5 6.Bb5+ c6 7.dxc6 bxc6 8.Be2 h6 1.e4 e5 2.Nf3 Nc6 3.Bc4 Nf6 4.Ng5 d5 5.exd5 Na5 6.Bb5+ c6 7.dxc6 bxc6 8.Be2	
C60	1.e4 e5 2.Nf3 Nc6 3.Bb5	Ruy Lopez
C61	1.e4 e5 2.Nf3 Nc6 3.Bb5 Nd4	
C62	1.e4 e5 2.Nf3 Nc6 3.Bb5 d6	
C63	1.e4 e5 2.Nf3 Nc6 3.Bb5 f5	Ruy Lopez, Jaenisch Gambit
C64	1.e4 e5 2.Nf3 Nc6 3.Bb5 Bc5	
C65	1.e4 e5 2.Nf3 Nc6 3.Bb5 Nf6	Ruy Lopez, Berlin Defence
C66	1.e4 e5 2.Nf3 Nc6 3.Bb5 Nf6 4.0-0 d6	
C67	1.e4 e5 2.Nf3 Nc6 3.Bb5 Nf6 4.0-0 Nxe4	
C68	1.e4 e5 2.Nf3 Nc6 3.Bb5 a6 4.Bxc6; 1.e4 e5 2.Nf3 Nc6 3.Bb5 a6	Ruy Lopez, Exchange Variation; Ruy Lopez, Morphy Defence
C69	1.e4 e5 2.Nf3 Nc6 3.Bb5 a6 4.Bxc6 dxc6 5.0-0; 1.e4 e5 2.Nf3 Nc6 3.Bb5 a6 4.Bxc6 dxc6 5.0-0 f6	
C70	1.e4 e5 2.Nf3 Nc6 3.Bb5 a6 4.Ba4	
C71	1.e4 e5 2.Nf3 Nc6 3.Bb5 a6 4.Ba4 d6	
C72	1.e4 e5 2.Nf3 Nc6 3.Bb5 a6 4.Ba4 d6 5.0-0	
C73	1.e4 e5 2.Nf3 Nc6 3.Bb5 a6 4.Ba4 d6 5.Bxc6+ bxc6 6.d4 1.e4 e5 2.Nf3 Nc6 3.Bb5 a6 4.Ba4 d6 5.Bxc6+ bxc6	
C74	1.e4 e5 2.Nf3 Nc6 3.Bb5 a6 4.Ba4 d6 5.c3	
C75	1.e4 e5 2.Nf3 Nc6 3.Bb5 a6 4.Ba4 d6 5.c3 Bd7	
C76	1.e4 e5 2.Nf3 Nc6 3.Bb5 a6 4.Ba4 d6 5.c3 Bd7 6.d4 g6	
C77	1.e4 e5 2.Nf3 Nc6 3.Bb5 a6 4.Ba4 Nf6	
C78	1.e4 e5 2.Nf3 Nc6 3.Bb5 a6 4.Ba4 Nf6 5.0-0	
C79	1.e4 e5 2.Nf3 Nc6 3.Bb5 a6 4.Ba4 Nf6 5.0-0 d6	
C80	1.e4 e5 2.Nf3 Nc6 3.Bb5 a6 4.Ba4 Nf6 5.0-0 Nxe4	
C81	1.e4 e5 2.Nf3 Nc6 3.Bb5 a6 4.Ba4 Nf6 5.0-0 Nxe4 6.d4 b5 7.Bb3 d5 8.dxe5 Be6 9.Qe2	
C82	1.e4 e5 2.Nf3 Nc6 3.Bb5 a6 4.Ba4 Nf6 5.0-0 Nxe4 6.d4 b5 7.Bb3 d5 8.dxe5 Be6 9.c3	
C83	1.e4 e5 2.Nf3 Nc6 3.Bb5 a6 4.Ba4 Nf6 5.0-0 Nxe4 6.d4 b5 7.Bb3 d5 8.dxe5 Be6 9.c3 Be7	
C84	1.e4 e5 2.Nf3 Nc6 3.Bb5 a6 4.Ba4 Nf6 5.0-0 Be7	Ruy Lopez, Closed Defence
C85	1.e4 e5 2.Nf3 Nc6 3.Bb5 a6 4.Ba4 Nf6 5.0-0 Be7 6.Bxc6 dxc6 1.e4 e5 2.Nf3 Nc6 3.Bb5 a6 4.Ba4 Nf6 5.0-0 Be7 6.Bxc6	
C86	1.e4 e5 2.Nf3 Nc6 3.Bb5 a6 4.Ba4 Nf6 5.0-0 Be7 6.Qe2	
C87	1.e4 e5 2.Nf3 Nc6 3.Bb5 a6 4.Ba4 Nf6 5.0-0 Be7 6.Re1 d6 1.e4 e5 2.Nf3 Nc6 3.Bb5 a6 4.Ba4 Nf6 5.0-0 Be7 6.Re1	
C88	1.e4 e5 2.Nf3 Nc6 3.Bb5 a6 4.Ba4 Nf6 5.0-0 Be7 6.Re1 b5 7.Bb3	
C89	1.e4 e5 2.Nf3 Nc6 3.Bb5 a6 4.Ba4 Nf6 5.0-0 Be7 6.Re1 b5 7.Bb3 0-0 8.c3 d5 1.e4 e5 2.Nf3 Nc6 3.Bb5 a6 4.Ba4 Nf6 5.0-0 Be7 6.Re1 b5 7.Bb3 0-0 8.c3	Ruy Lopez, Marshall Attack
C90	1.e4 e5 2.Nf3 Nc6 3.Bb5 a6 4.Ba4 Nf6 5.0-0 Be7 6.Re1 b5 7.Bb3 0-0 8.c3 d6 1.e4 e5 2.Nf3 Nc6 3.Bb5 a6 4.Ba4 Nf6 5.0-0 Be7 6.Re1 b5 7.Bb3 d6	
C91	1.e4 e5 2.Nf3 Nc6 3.Bb5 a6 4.Ba4 Nf6 5.0-0 Be7 6.Re1 b5 7.Bb3 0-0 8.c3 d6 9.d4 1.e4 e5 2.Nf3 Nc6 3.Bb5 a6 4.Ba4 Nf6 5.0-0 Be7 6.Re1 b5 7.Bb3 d6 8.c3 0-0 9.d4	
C92	1.e4 e5 2.Nf3 Nc6 3.Bb5 a6 4.Ba4 Nf6 5.0-0 Be7 6.Re1 b5 7.Bb3 0-0 8.c3 d6 9.h3 1.e4 e5 2.Nf3 Nc6 3.Bb5 a6 4.Ba4 Nf6 5.0-0 Be7 6.Re1 b5 7.Bb3 d6 8.c3 0-0 9.h3	
C93	1.e4 e5 2.Nf3 Nc6 3.Bb5 a6 4.Ba4 Nf6 5.0-0 Be7 6.Re1 b5 7.Bb3 0-0 8.c3 d6 9.h3 h6 1.e4 e5 2.Nf3 Nc6 3.Bb5 a6 4.Ba4 Nf6 5.0-0 Be7 6.Re1 b5 7.Bb3 d6 8.c3 0-0 9.h3 h6	
C94	1.e4 e5 2.Nf3 Nc6 3.Bb5 a6 4.Ba4 Nf6 5.0-0 Be7 6.Re1 b5 7.Bb3 0-0 8.c3 d6 9.h3 Nb8; 1.e4 e5 2.Nf3 Nc6 3.Bb5 a6 4.Ba4 Nf6 5.0-0 Be7 6.Re1 b5 7.Bb3 d6 8.c3 0-0 9.h3 Nb8	
C95	1.e4 e5 2.Nf3 Nc6 3.Bb5 a6 4.Ba4 Nf6 5.0-0 Be7 6.Re1 b5 7.Bb3 0-0 8.c3 d6 9.h3 Nb8 10.d4 1.e4 e5 2.Nf3 Nc6 3.Bb5 a6 4.Ba4 Nf6 5.0-0 Be7 6.Re1 b5 7.Bb3 d6 8.c3 0-0 9.h3 Nb8 10.d4	
C96	1.e4 e5 2.Nf3 Nc6 3.Bb5 a6 4.Ba4 Nf6 5.0-0 Be7 6.Re1 b5 7.Bb3 0-0 8.c3 d6 9.h3 Na5 10.Bc2; 1.e4 e5 2.Nf3 Nc6 3.Bb5 a6 4.Ba4 Nf6 5.0-0 Be7 6.Re1 b5 7.Bb3 d6 8.c3 0-0 9.h3 Na5	
C97	1.e4 e5 2.Nf3 Nc6 3.Bb5 a6 4.Ba4 Nf6 5.0-0 Be7 6.Re1 b5 7.Bb3 0-0 8.c3 d6 9.h3 Na5 10.Bc2 c5 11.d4 Qc7; 1.e4 e5 2.Nf3 Nc6 3.Bb5 a6 4.Ba4 Nf6 5.0-0 Be7 6.Re1 b5 7.Bb3 d6 8.c3 0-0 9.h3 Na5 10.Bc2 c5 11.d4 Qc7	
C98	1.e4 e5 2.Nf3 Nc6 3.Bb5 a6 4.Ba4 Nf6 5.0-0 Be7 6.Re1 b5 7.Bb3 0-0 8.c3 d6 9.h3 Na5 10.Bc2 c5 11.d4 Qc7 12.Nbd2 Nc6; 1.e4 e5 2.Nf3 Nc6 3.Bb5 a6 4.Ba4 Nf6 5.0-0 Be7 6.Re1 b5 7.Bb3 d6 8.c3 0-0 9.h3 Na5 10.Bc2 c5 11.d4 Qc7 12.Nbd2 Nc6	
C99	1.e4 e5 2.Nf3 Nc6 3.Bb5 a6 4.Ba4 Nf6 5.0-0 Be7 6.Re1 b5 7.Bb3 0-0 8.c3 d6 9.h3 Na5 10.Bc2 c5 11.d4 Qc7 12.Nbd2 cxd4 13.cxd4 1.e4 e5 2.Nf3 Nc6 3.Bb5 a6 4.Ba4 Nf6 5.0-0 Be7 6.Re1 b5 7.Bb3 d6 8.c3 0-0 9.h3 Na5 10.Bc2 c5 11.d4 Qc7 12.Nbd2 cxd4	
D (↑)		
D00	1.d4 d5	Closed Game
D01	1.d4 d5 2.Nc3 Nf6 3.Bg5; 1.d4 d5 2.Nc3	Richter–Veresov Attack; Chigorin Variation
D02	1.d4 d5 2.Nf3	
D03	1.d4 d5 2.Nf3 Nf6 3.Bg5	
D04	1.d4 d5 2.Nf3 Nf6 3.e3	
D05	1.d4 d5 2.Nf3 Nf6 3.e3 e6	
D06	1.d4 d5 2.c4	Queen's Gambit
D07	1.d4 d5 2.c4 Nc6	Chigorin Defence
D08	1.d4 d5 2.c4 e5	Albin Countergambit
D09	1.d4 d5 2.c4 e5 3.dxe5 d4 4.Nf3 Nc6 5.g3	
D10	1.d4 d5 2.c4 c6	Slav Defence
D11	1.d4 d5 2.c4 c6 3.Nf3	
D12	1.d4 d5 2.c4 c6 3.Nf3 Nf6 4.e3 Bf5; 1.d4 d5 2.c4 c6 3.Nf3 Nf6 4.e3	
D13	1.d4 d5 2.c4 c6 3.Nf3 Nf6 4.cxd5 cxd5 1.d4 d5 2.c4 c6 3.Nf3 Nf6 4.cxd5	
D14	1.d4 d5 2.c4 c6 3.Nf3 Nf6 4.cxd5 cxd5 5.Bf4 Bf5; 1.d4 d5 2.c4 c6 3.Nf3 Nf6 4.cxd5 cxd5 5.Nc3 Nc6 6.Bf4 Bf5	
D15	1.d4 d5 2.c4 c6 3.Nf3 Nf6 4.Nc3	
D16	1.d4 d5 2.c4 c6 3.Nf3 Nf6 4.Nc3 dxc4 5.a4	
D17	1.d4 d5 2.c4 c6 3.Nf3 Nf6 4.Nc3 dxc4 5.a4 Bf5	
D18	1.d4 d5 2.c4 c6 3.Nf3 Nf6 4.Nc3 dxc4 5.a4 Bf5 6.e3	
D19	1.d4 d5 2.c4 c6 3.Nf3 Nf6 4.Nc3 dxc4 5.a4 Bf5 6.e3 e6 7.Bxc4 Bb4 8.0-0 0-0 9.Qe2	
D20	1.d4 d5 2.c4 dxc4	Queen's Gambit Accepted
D21	1.d4 d5 2.c4 dxc4 3.Nf3	
D22	1.d4 d5 2.c4 dxc4 3.Nf3 a6 4.e3 1.d4 d5 2.c4 dxc4 3.Nf3 a6	
D23	1.d4 d5 2.c4 dxc4 3.Nf3 Nf6	
D24	1.d4 d5 2.c4 dxc4 3.Nf3 Nf6 4.Nc3	
D25	1.d4 d5 2.c4 dxc4 3.Nf3 Nf6 4.e3	
D26	1.d4 d5 2.c4 dxc4 3.Nf3 Nf6 4.e3 e6	
D27	1.d4 d5 2.c4 dxc4 3.Nf3 Nf6 4.e3 e6 5.Bxc4 c5 6.0-0 a6 1.d4 d5 2.c4 dxc4 3.Nf3 Nf6 4.e3 e6 5.Bxc4 c5 6.0-0	
D28	1.d4 d5 2.c4 dxc4 3.Nf3 Nf6 4.e3 e6 5.Bxc4 c5 6.0-0 a6 7.Qe2	
D29	1.d4 d5 2.c4 dxc4 3.Nf3 Nf6 4.e3 e6 5.Bxc4 c5 6.0-0 a6 7.Qe2 b5 8.Bb3 Bb7; 1.d4 d5 2.c4 dxc4 3.Nf3 Nf6 4.e3 e6 5.Bxc4 c5 6.0-0 a6 7.Qe2 b5	
D30	1.d4 d5 2.c4 e6	Queen's Gambit Declined
D31	1.d4 d5 2.c4 e6 3.Nc3	
D32	1.d4 d5 2.c4 e6 3.Nc3 c5	Tarrasch Defence
D33	1.d4 d5 2.c4 e6 3.Nc3 c5 4.cxd5 exd5 5.Nf3 Nc6 6.g3	
D34	1.d4 d5 2.c4 e6 3.Nc3 c5 4.cxd5 exd5 5.Nf3 Nc6 6.g3 Nf6 7.Bg2 Be7; 1.d4 d5 2.c4 e6 3.Nc3 c5 4.cxd5 exd5 5.Nf3 Nc6 6.g3 Nf6	
D35	1.d4 d5 2.c4 e6 3.Nc3 Nf6	
D36	1.d4 d5 2.c4 e6 3.Nc3 Nf6 4.cxd5 exd5 5.Bg5 c6 6.Qc2	
D37	1.d4 d5 2.c4 e6 3.Nc3 Nf6 4.Nf3	
D38	1.d4 d5 2.c4 e6 3.Nc3 Nf6 4.Nf3 Bb4	Ragozin Variation
D39	1.d4 d5 2.c4 e6 3.Nc3 Nf6 4.Nf3 Bb4 5.Bg5 dxc4 1.d4 d5 2.c4 e6 3.Nc3 Nf6 4.Nf3 Bb4 5.Bg5	
D40	1.d4 d5 2.c4 e6 3.Nc3 Nf6 4.Nf3 c5	Semi-Tarrasch Defence
D41	1.d4 d5 2.c4 e6 3.Nc3 Nf6 4.Nf3 c5 5.cxd5	
D42	1.d4 d5 2.c4 e6 3.Nc3 Nf6 4.Nf3 c5 5.cxd5 Nxd5 6.e3 Nc6 7.Bd3; 1.d4 d5 2.c4 e6 3.Nc3 Nf6 4.Nf3 c5 5.cxd5 Nxd5 6.e3	
D43	1.d4 d5 2.c4 e6 3.Nc3 Nf6 4.Nf3 c6	Semi-Slav Defence
D44	1.d4 d5 2.c4 e6 3.Nc3 Nf6 4.Nf3 c6 5.Bg5 dxc4	
D45	1.d4 d5 2.c4 e6 3.Nc3 Nf6 4.Nf3 c6 5.e3	
D46	1.d4 d5 2.c4 e6 3.Nc3 Nf6 4.Nf3 c6 5.e3 Nbd7 6.Bd3	
D47	1.d4 d5 2.c4 e6 3.Nc3 Nf6 4.Nf3 c6 5.e3 Nbd7 6.Bd3 dxc4 7.Bxc4	
D48	1.d4 d5 2.c4 e6 3.Nc3 Nf6 4.Nf3 c6 5.e3 Nbd7 6.Bd3 dxc4 7.Bxc4 b5 8.Bd3 a6	
D49	1.d4 d5 2.c4 e6 3.Nc3 Nf6 4.Nf3 c6 5.e3 Nbd7 6.Bd3 dxc4 7.Bxc4 b5 8.Bd3 a6 9.e4 c5 10.e5 cxd4 11.Nxb5; 1.d4 d5 2.c4 e6 3.Nc3 Nf6 4.Nf3 c6 5.e3 Nbd7 6.Bd3 dxc4 7.Bxc4 b5 8.Bd3 a6 9.e4 c5 10.e5	
D50	1.d4 d5 2.c4 e6 3.Nc3 Nf6 4.Bg5	
D51	1.d4 d5 2.c4 e6 3.Nc3 Nf6 4.Bg5 Nbd7	
D52	1.d4 d5 2.c4 e6 3.Nc3 Nf6 4.Bg5 Nbd7 5.e3 c6 6.Nf3	
D53	1.d4 d5 2.c4 e6 3.Nc3 Nf6 4.Bg5 Be7	
D54	1.d4 d5 2.c4 e6 3.Nc3 Nf6 4.Bg5 Be7 5.e3 0-0 6.Rc1; 1.d4 d5 2.c4 e6 3.Nc3 Nf6 4.Bg5 Be7 5.e3	
D55	1.d4 d5 2.c4 e6 3.Nc3 Nf6 4.Bg5 Be7 5.e3 0-0 6.Nf3	
D56	1.d4 d5 2.c4 e6 3.Nc3 Nf6 4.Bg5 Be7 5.e3 0-0 6.Nf3 h6 7.Bh4	
D57	1.d4 d5 2.c4 e6 3.Nc3 Nf6 4.Bg5 Be7 5.e3 0-0 6.Nf3 h6 7.Bh4 Ne4 8.Bxe7 Qxe7 9.cxd5 Nxc3 10.bxc3 1.d4 d5 2.c4 e6 3.Nc3 Nf6 4.Bg5 Be7 5.e3 0-0 6.Nf3 h6 7.Bh4 Ne4 8.Bxe7 Qxe7 9.cxd5	
D58	1.d4 d5 2.c4 e6 3.Nc3 Nf6 4.Bg5 Be7 5.e3 0-0 6.Nf3 h6 7.Bh4 b6	
D59	1.d4 d5 2.c4 e6 3.Nc3 Nf6 4.Bg5 Be7 5.e3 0-0 6.Nf3 h6 7.Bh4 b6 8.cxd5 Nxd5; 1.d4 d5 2.c4 e6 3.Nc3 Nf6 4.Bg5 Be7 5.e3 0-0 6.Nf3 h6 7.Bh4 b6 8.cxd5	
D60	1.d4 d5 2.c4 e6 3.Nc3 Nf6 4.Bg5 Be7 5.e3 0-0 6.Nf3 Nbd7	
D61	1.d4 d5 2.c4 e6 3.Nc3 Nf6 4.Bg5 Be7 5.e3 0-0 6.Nf3 Nbd7 7.Qc2	
D62	1.d4 d5 2.c4 e6 3.Nc3 Nf6 4.Bg5 Be7 5.e3 0-0 6.Nf3 Nbd7 7.Qc2 c5 8.cxd5	
D63	1.d4 d5 2.c4 e6 3.Nc3 Nf6 4.Bg5 Be7 5.e3 0-0 6.Nf3 Nbd7 7.Rc1	
D64	1.d4 d5 2.c4 e6 3.Nc3 Nf6 4.Bg5 Be7 5.e3 0-0 6.Nf3 Nbd7 7.Rc1 c6 8.Qc2; 1.d4 d5 2.c4 e6 3.Nc3 Nf6 4.Bg5 Be7 5.e3 0-0 6.Nf3 Nbd7 7.Rc1 c6	
D65	1.d4 d5 2.c4 e6 3.Nc3 Nf6 4.Bg5 Be7 5.e3 0-0 6.Nf3 Nbd7 7.Rc1 c6 8.Qc2 a6 9.cxd5	
D66	1.d4 d5 2.c4 e6 3.Nc3 Nf6 4.Bg5 Be7 5.e3 0-0 6.Nf3 Nbd7 7.Rc1 c6 8.Bd3	
D67	1.d4 d5 2.c4 e6 3.Nc3 Nf6 4.Bg5 Be7 5.e3 0-0 6.Nf3 Nbd7 7.Rc1 c6 8.Bd3 dxc4 9.Bxc4 Nd5	
D68	1.d4 d5 2.c4 e6 3.Nc3 Nf6 4.Bg5 Be7 5.e3 0-0 6.Nf3 Nbd7 7.Rc1 c6 8.Bd3 dxc4 9.Bxc4 Nd5 10.Bxe7 Qxe7 11.0-0 Nxc3 12.Rxc3 e5 1.d4 d5 2.c4 e6 3.Nc3 Nf6 4.Bg5 Be7 5.e3 0-0 6.Nf3 Nbd7 7.Rc1 c6 8.Bd3 dxc4 9.Bxc4 Nd5 10.Bxe7 Qxe7 11.0-0	
D69	1.d4 d5 2.c4 e6 3.Nc3 Nf6 4.Bg5 Be7 5.e3 0-0 6.Nf3 Nbd7 7.Rc1 c6 8.Bd3 dxc4 9.Bxc4 Nd5 10.Bxe7 Qxe7 11.0-0 Nxc3 12.Rxc3 e5 13.dxe5 Nxe5 14.Nxe5 Qxe5; 1.d4 d5 2.c4 e6 3.Nc3 Nf6 4.Bg5 Be7 5.e3 0-0 6.Nf3 Nbd7 7.Rc1 c6 8.Bd3 dxc4 9.Bxc4 Nd5 10.Bxe7 Qxe7 11.0-0 Nxc3 12.Rxc3 e5 13.dxe5	
D70	1.d4 Nf6 2.c4 g6 with d7–d5 1.d4 Nf6 2.c4 g6 with 3...d5	Grünfeld Defence
D71	1.d4 Nf6 2.c4 g6 3.g3 d5 4.Bg2 Bg7 5.cxd5 Nxd5; 1.d4 Nf6 2.c4 g6 3.g3 d5	
D72	1.d4 Nf6 2.c4 g6 3.g3 d5 4.Bg2 Bg7 5.cxd5 Nxd5 6.e4 Nb6 7.Ne2; 1.d4 Nf6 2.c4 g6 3.g3 d5 4.Bg2 Bg7 5.cxd5 Nxd5 6.e4	
D73	1.d4 Nf6 2.c4 g6 3.g3 d5 4.Bg2 Bg7 5.Nf3	
D74	1.d4 Nf6 2.c4 g6 3.g3 d5 4.Bg2 Bg7 5.Nf3 0-0 6.cxd5 Nxd5 7.0-0; 1.d4 Nf6 2.c4 g6 3.g3 d5 4.Bg2 Bg7 5.Nf3 0-0	
D75	1.d4 Nf6 2.c4 g6 3.g3 d5 4.Bg2 Bg7 5.Nf3 0-0 6.cxd5 Nxd5 7.0-0 c5	
D76	1.d4 Nf6 2.c4 g6 3.g3 d5 4.Bg2 Bg7 5.Nf3 0-0 6.cxd5 Nxd5 7.0-0 Nb6	
D77	1.d4 Nf6 2.c4 g6 3.g3 d5 4.Bg2 Bg7 5.Nf3 0-0 6.0-0	
D78	1.d4 Nf6 2.c4 g6 3.g3 d5 4.Bg2 Bg7 5.Nf3 0-0 6.0-0 c6	
D79	1.d4 Nf6 2.c4 g6 3.g3 d5 4.Bg2 Bg7 5.Nf3 0-0 6.0-0 c6 7.cxd5 cxd5 1.d4 Nf6 2.c4 g6 3.g3 d5 4.Bg2 Bg7 5.Nf3 0-0 6.0-0 c6 7.cxd5	
D80	1.d4 Nf6 2.c4 g6 3.Nc3 d5 4.Bg5; 1.d4 Nf6 2.c4 g6 3.Nc3 d5	
D81	1.d4 Nf6 2.c4 g6 3.Nc3 d5 4.Qb3	
D82	1.d4 Nf6 2.c4 g6 3.Nc3 d5 4.Bf4	
D83	1.d4 Nf6 2.c4 g6 3.Nc3 d5 4.Bf4 Bg7 5.e3 0-0	
D84	1.d4 Nf6 2.c4 g6 3.Nc3 d5 4.Bf4 Bg7 5.e3 0-0 6.cxd5 Nxd5 7.Nxd5 Qxd5 8.Bxc7; 1.d4 Nf6 2.c4 g6 3.Nc3 d5 4.Bf4 Bg7 5.e3 0-0 6.cxd5	
D85	1.d4 Nf6 2.c4 g6 3.Nc3 d5 4.cxd5 Nxd5; 1.d4 Nf6 2.c4 g6 3.Nc3 d5 4.cxd5	
D86	1.d4 Nf6 2.c4 g6 3.Nc3 d5 4.cxd5 Nxd5 5.e4 Nxc3 6.bxc3 Bg7 7.Bc4	
D87	1.d4 Nf6 2.c4 g6 3.Nc3 d5 4.cxd5 Nxd5 5.e4 Nxc3 6.bxc3 Bg7 7.Bc4 0-0 8.Ne2 c5	
D88	1.d4 Nf6 2.c4 g6 3.Nc3 d5 4.cxd5 Nxd5 5.e4 Nxc3 6.bxc3 Bg7 7.Bc4 0-0 8.Ne2 c5 9.0-0 Nc6 10.Be3 cxd4 11.cxd4 1.d4 Nf6 2.c4 g6 3.Nc3 d5 4.cxd5 Nxd5 5.e4 Nxc3 6.bxc3 Bg7 7.Bc4 0-0 8.Ne2 c5 9.0-0 Nc6 10.Be3 cxd4	
D89	1.d4 Nf6 2.c4 g6 3.Nc3 d5 4.cxd5 Nxd5 5.e4 Nxc3 6.bxc3 Bg7 7.Bc4 0-0 8.Ne2 c5 9.0-0 Nc6 10.Be3 cxd4 11.cxd4 Bg4 12.f3 Na5 13.Bd3	
D90	1.d4 Nf6 2.c4 g6 3.Nc3 d5 4.Nf3	
D91	1.d4 Nf6 2.c4 g6 3.Nc3 d5 4.Nf3 Bg7 5.Bg5	
D92	1.d4 Nf6 2.c4 g6 3.Nc3 d5 4.Nf3 Bg7 5.Bf4	
D93	1.d4 Nf6 2.c4 g6 3.Nc3 d5 4.Nf3 Bg7 5.Bf4 0-0 6.e3	
D94	1.d4 Nf6 2.c4 g6 3.Nc3 d5 4.Nf3 Bg7 5.e3	
D95	1.d4 Nf6 2.c4 g6 3.Nc3 d5 4.Nf3 Bg7 5.e3 0-0 6.Qb3	
D96	1.d4 Nf6 2.c4 g6 3.Nc3 d5 4.Nf3 Bg7 5.Qb3	Grünfeld Defence, Russian System
D97	1.d4 Nf6 2.c4 g6 3.Nc3 d5 4.Nf3 Bg7 5.Qb3 dxc4 6.Qxc4 0-0 7.e4 1.d4 Nf6 2.c4 g6 3.Nc3 d5 4.Nf3 Bg7 5.Qb3 dxc4	
D98	1.d4 Nf6 2.c4 g6 3.Nc3 d5 4.Nf3 Bg7 5.Qb3 dxc4 6.Qxc4 0-0 7.e4 Bg4	
D99	1.d4 Nf6 2.c4 g6 3.Nc3 d5 4.Nf3 Bg7 5.Qb3 dxc4 6.Qxc4 0-0 7.e4 Bg4 8.Be3 Nfd7 9.Qb3	
E (↑)		
E00	1.d4 Nf6 2.c4 e6 3.g3 1.d4 Nf6 2.c4 e6	Catalan Opening
E01	1.d4 Nf6 2.c4 e6 3.g3 d5 4.Bg2; 1.d4 Nf6 2.c4 e6 3.g3 d5	
E02	1.d4 Nf6 2.c4 e6 3.g3 d5 4.Bg2 dxc4 5.Qa4+ 1.d4 Nf6 2.c4 e6 3.g3 d5 4.Bg2 dxc4	
E03	1.d4 Nf6 2.c4 e6 3.g3 d5 4.Bg2 dxc4 5.Qa4+ Nbd7 6.Qxc4	
E04	1.d4 Nf6 2.c4 e6 3.g3 d5 4.Bg2 dxc4 5.Nf3	
E05	1.d4 Nf6 2.c4 e6 3.g3 d5 4.Bg2 dxc4 5.Nf3 Be7	
E06	1.d4 Nf6 2.c4 e6 3.g3 d5 4.Bg2 Be7 5.Nf3; 1.d4 Nf6 2.c4 e6 3.g3 d5 4.Bg2 Be7	
E07	1.d4 Nf6 2.c4 e6 3.g3 d5 4.Bg2 Be7 5.Nf3 0-0 6.0-0 Nbd7	
E08	1.d4 Nf6 2.c4 e6 3.g3 d5 4.Bg2 Be7 5.Nf3 0-0 6.0-0 Nbd7 7.Qc2	
E09	1.d4 Nf6 2.c4 e6 3.g3 d5 4.Bg2 Be7 5.Nf3 0-0 6.0-0 Nbd7 7.Qc2 c6 8.Nbd2	
E10	1.d4 Nf6 2.c4 e6 3.Nf3	
E11	1.d4 Nf6 2.c4 e6 3.Nf3 Bb4+	Bogo-Indian Defence
E12	1.d4 Nf6 2.c4 e6 3.Nf3 b6	Queen's Indian Defence
E13	1.d4 Nf6 2.c4 e6 3.Nf3 b6 4.Nc3 Bb7 5.Bg5 h6 6.Bh4 Bb4; 1.d4 Nf6 2.c4 e6 3.Nf3 b6 4.Nc3 Bb7 5.Bg5	
E14	1.d4 Nf6 2.c4 e6 3.Nf3 b6 4.e3	
E15	1.d4 Nf6 2.c4 e6 3.Nf3 b6 4.g3	
E16	1.d4 Nf6 2.c4 e6 3.Nf3 b6 4.g3 Bb7 5.Bg2 Bb4+ 1.d4 Nf6 2.c4 e6 3.Nf3 b6 4.g3 Bb7	
E17	1.d4 Nf6 2.c4 e6 3.Nf3 b6 4.g3 Bb7 5.Bg2 Be7	
E18	1.d4 Nf6 2.c4 e6 3.Nf3 b6 4.g3 Bb7 5.Bg2 Be7 6.0-0 0-0 7.Nc3	
E19	1.d4 Nf6 2.c4 e6 3.Nf3 b6 4.g3 Bb7 5.Bg2 Be7 6.0-0 0-0 7.Nc3 Ne4 8.Qc2 Nxc3 9.Qxc3; 1.d4 Nf6 2.c4 e6 3.Nf3 b6 4.g3 Bb7 5.Bg2 Be7 6.0-0 0-0 7.Nc3 Ne4 8.Qc2	
E20	1.d4 Nf6 2.c4 e6 3.Nc3 Bb4; 1.d4 Nf6 2.c4 e6 3.Nc3	Nimzo-Indian Defence
E21	1.d4 Nf6 2.c4 e6 3.Nc3 Bb4 4.Nf3	
E22	1.d4 Nf6 2.c4 e6 3.Nc3 Bb4 4.Qb3	
E23	1.d4 Nf6 2.c4 e6 3.Nc3 Bb4 4.Qb3 c5 5.dxc5 Nc6; 1.d4 Nf6 2.c4 e6 3.Nc3 Bb4 4.Qb3 c5	
E24	1.d4 Nf6 2.c4 e6 3.Nc3 Bb4 4.a3 Bxc3+ 5.bxc3 1.d4 Nf6 2.c4 e6 3.Nc3 Bb4 4.a3	
E25	1.d4 Nf6 2.c4 e6 3.Nc3 Bb4 4.a3 Bxc3+ 5.bxc3 c5 6.f3 d5 7.cxd5 1.d4 Nf6 2.c4 e6 3.Nc3 Bb4 4.a3 Bxc3+ 5.bxc3 c5	
E26	1.d4 Nf6 2.c4 e6 3.Nc3 Bb4 4.a3 Bxc3+ 5.bxc3 c5 6.e3	
E27	1.d4 Nf6 2.c4 e6 3.Nc3 Bb4 4.a3 Bxc3+ 5.bxc3 0-0	
E28	1.d4 Nf6 2.c4 e6 3.Nc3 Bb4 4.a3 Bxc3+ 5.bxc3 0-0 6.e3	
E29	1.d4 Nf6 2.c4 e6 3.Nc3 Bb4 4.a3 Bxc3+ 5.bxc3 0-0 6.e3 c5 7.Bd3 Nc6; 1.d4 Nf6 2.c4 e6 3.Nc3 Bb4 4.a3 Bxc3+ 5.bxc3 0-0 6.e3 c5	
E30	1.d4 Nf6 2.c4 e6 3.Nc3 Bb4 4.Bg5	
E31	1.d4 Nf6 2.c4 e6 3.Nc3 Bb4 4.Bg5 h6 5.Bh4 c5 6.d5 d6	
E32	1.d4 Nf6 2.c4 e6 3.Nc3 Bb4 4.Qc2	
E33	1.d4 Nf6 2.c4 e6 3.Nc3 Bb4 4.Qc2 Nc6	
E34	1.d4 Nf6 2.c4 e6 3.Nc3 Bb4 4.Qc2 d5	
E35	1.d4 Nf6 2.c4 e6 3.Nc3 Bb4 4.Qc2 d5 5.cxd5 exd5	
E36	1.d4 Nf6 2.c4 e6 3.Nc3 Bb4 4.Qc2 d5 5.a3	
E37	1.d4 Nf6 2.c4 e6 3.Nc3 Bb4 4.Qc2 d5 5.a3 Bxc3+ 6.Qxc3 Ne4 7.Qc2; 1.d4 Nf6 2.c4 e6 3.Nc3 Bb4 4.Qc2 d5 5.a3 Bxc3+ 6.Qxc3 Ne4	
E38	1.d4 Nf6 2.c4 e6 3.Nc3 Bb4 4.Qc2 c5	
E39	1.d4 Nf6 2.c4 e6 3.Nc3 Bb4 4.Qc2 c5 5.dxc5 0-0 6.Nf3; 1.d4 Nf6 2.c4 e6 3.Nc3 Bb4 4.Qc2 c5 5.dxc5 0-0	
E40	1.d4 Nf6 2.c4 e6 3.Nc3 Bb4 4.e3	
E41	1.d4 Nf6 2.c4 e6 3.Nc3 Bb4 4.e3 c5	
E42	1.d4 Nf6 2.c4 e6 3.Nc3 Bb4 4.e3 c5 5.Nge2	
E43	1.d4 Nf6 2.c4 e6 3.Nc3 Bb4 4.e3 b6	
E44	1.d4 Nf6 2.c4 e6 3.Nc3 Bb4 4.e3 b6 5.Nge2	
E45	1.d4 Nf6 2.c4 e6 3.Nc3 Bb4 4.e3 b6 5.Nge2 Ba6	
E46	1.d4 Nf6 2.c4 e6 3.Nc3 Bb4 4.e3 0-0	
E47	1.d4 Nf6 2.c4 e6 3.Nc3 Bb4 4.e3 0-0 5.Bd3	
E48	1.d4 Nf6 2.c4 e6 3.Nc3 Bb4 4.e3 0-0 5.Bd3 d5	
E49	1.d4 Nf6 2.c4 e6 3.Nc3 Bb4 4.e3 0-0 5.Bd3 d5 6.a3 Bxc3+ 7.bxc3 1.d4 Nf6 2.c4 e6 3.Nc3 Bb4 4.e3 0-0 5.Bd3 d5 6.a3	
E50	1.d4 Nf6 2.c4 e6 3.Nc3 Bb4 4.e3 0-0 5.Nf3	
E51	1.d4 Nf6 2.c4 e6 3.Nc3 Bb4 4.e3 0-0 5.Nf3 d5	
E52	1.d4 Nf6 2.c4 e6 3.Nc3 Bb4 4.e3 0-0 5.Nf3 d5 6.Bd3 b6	
E53	1.d4 Nf6 2.c4 e6 3.Nc3 Bb4 4.e3 0-0 5.Nf3 d5 6.Bd3 c5	
E54	1.d4 Nf6 2.c4 e6 3.Nc3 Bb4 4.e3 0-0 5.Nf3 d5 6.Bd3 c5 7.0-0 dxc4 8.Bxc4	
E55	1.d4 Nf6 2.c4 e6 3.Nc3 Bb4 4.e3 0-0 5.Nf3 d5 6.Bd3 c5 7.0-0 dxc4 8.Bxc4 Nbd7	
E56	1.d4 Nf6 2.c4 e6 3.Nc3 Bb4 4.e3 0-0 5.Nf3 d5 6.Bd3 c5 7.0-0 Nc6	
E57	1.d4 Nf6 2.c4 e6 3.Nc3 Bb4 4.e3 0-0 5.Nf3 d5 6.Bd3 c5 7.0-0 Nc6 8.a3 dxc4 9.Bxc4 cxd4	
E58	1.d4 Nf6 2.c4 e6 3.Nc3 Bb4 4.e3 0-0 5.Nf3 d5 6.Bd3 c5 7.0-0 Nc6 8.a3 Bxc3 9.bxc3	
E59	1.d4 Nf6 2.c4 e6 3.Nc3 Bb4 4.e3 0-0 5.Nf3 d5 6.Bd3 c5 7.0-0 Nc6 8.a3 Bxc3 9.bxc3 dxc4 10.Bxc4	
E60	1.d4 Nf6 2.c4 g6	King's Indian Defence
E61	1.d4 Nf6 2.c4 g6 3.Nc3	
E62	1.d4 Nf6 2.c4 g6 3.Nc3 Bg7 4.Nf3 d6 5.g3 1.d4 Nf6 2.c4 g6 3.Nc3 Bg7 4.Nf3 0-0 5.g3	
E63	1.d4 Nf6 2.c4 g6 3.Nc3 Bg7 4.Nf3 d6 5.g3 0-0 6.Bg2 Nc6 7.0-0 a6 1.d4 Nf6 2.c4 g6 3.Nc3 Bg7 4.Nf3 0-0 5.g3 d6 6.Bg2 Nc6	
E64	1.d4 Nf6 2.c4 g6 3.Nc3 Bg7 4.Nf3 d6 5.g3 0-0 6.Bg2 c5 1.d4 Nf6 2.c4 g6 3.Nc3 Bg7 4.Nf3 0-0 5.g3 d6 6.Bg2 c5	
E65	1.d4 Nf6 2.c4 g6 3.Nc3 Bg7 4.Nf3 d6 5.g3 0-0 6.Bg2 c5 7.0-0; 1.d4 Nf6 2.c4 g6 3.Nc3 Bg7 4.Nf3 0-0 5.g3 d6 6.Bg2 c5 7.0-0	
E66	1.d4 Nf6 2.c4 g6 3.Nc3 Bg7 4.Nf3 d6 5.g3 0-0 6.Bg2 c5 7.0-0 Nc6 8.d5 1.d4 Nf6 2.c4 g6 3.Nc3 Bg7 4.Nf3 0-0 5.g3 d6 6.Bg2 c5 7.0-0 Nc6 8.d5	
E67	1.d4 Nf6 2.c4 g6 3.Nc3 Bg7 4.Nf3 d6 5.g3 0-0 6.Bg2 Nbd7; 1.d4 Nf6 2.c4 g6 3.Nc3 Bg7 4.Nf3 0-0 5.g3 d6 6.Bg2 Nbd7	
E68	1.d4 Nf6 2.c4 g6 3.Nc3 Bg7 4.Nf3 d6 5.g3 0-0 6.Bg2 Nbd7 7.0-0 e5 8.e4 1.d4 Nf6 2.c4 g6 3.Nc3 Bg7 4.Nf3 0-0 5.g3 d6 6.Bg2 Nbd7 7.0-0 e5 8.e4	
E69	1.d4 Nf6 2.c4 g6 3.Nc3 Bg7 4.Nf3 d6 5.g3 0-0 6.Bg2 Nbd7 7.0-0 e5 8.e4 c6 9.h3 1.d4 Nf6 2.c4 g6 3.Nc3 Bg7 4.Nf3 0-0 5.g3 d6 6.Bg2 Nbd7 7.0-0 e5 8.e4 c6 9.h3	
E70	1.d4 Nf6 2.c4 g6 3.Nc3 Bg7 4.e4	
E71	1.d4 Nf6 2.c4 g6 3.Nc3 Bg7 4.e4 d6 5.h3	
E72	1.d4 Nf6 2.c4 g6 3.Nc3 Bg7 4.e4 d6 5.g3	
E73	1.d4 Nf6 2.c4 g6 3.Nc3 Bg7 4.e4 d6 5.Be2	
E74	1.d4 Nf6 2.c4 g6 3.Nc3 Bg7 4.e4 d6 5.Be2 0-0 6.Bg5 c5	
E75	1.d4 Nf6 2.c4 g6 3.Nc3 Bg7 4.e4 d6 5.Be2 0-0 6.Bg5 c5 7.d5 e6	
E76	1.d4 Nf6 2.c4 g6 3.Nc3 Bg7 4.e4 d6 5.f4	King's Indian Defence, Four Pawns Attack
E77	1.d4 Nf6 2.c4 g6 3.Nc3 Bg7 4.e4 d6 5.f4 0-0 6.Be2	
E78	1.d4 Nf6 2.c4 g6 3.Nc3 Bg7 4.e4 d6 5.f4 0-0 6.Be2 c5 7.Nf3	
E79	1.d4 Nf6 2.c4 g6 3.Nc3 Bg7 4.e4 d6 5.f4 0-0 6.Be2 c5 7.Nf3 cxd4 8.Nxd4 Nc6 9.Be3; 1.d4 Nf6 2.c4 g6 3.Nc3 Bg7 4.e4 d6 5.f4 0-0 6.Be2 c5 7.Nf3 cxd4 8.Nxd4 Nc6	
E80	1.d4 Nf6 2.c4 g6 3.Nc3 Bg7 4.e4 d6 5.f3	King's Indian Defence, Sämisch Variation
E81	1.d4 Nf6 2.c4 g6 3.Nc3 Bg7 4.e4 d6 5.f3 0-0	
E82	1.d4 Nf6 2.c4 g6 3.Nc3 Bg7 4.e4 d6 5.f3 0-0 6.Be3 b6	
E83	1.d4 Nf6 2.c4 g6 3.Nc3 Bg7 4.e4 d6 5.f3 0-0 6.Be3 Nc6	
E84	1.d4 Nf6 2.c4 g6 3.Nc3 Bg7 4.e4 d6 5.f3 0-0 6.Be3 Nc6 7.Nge2 a6 8.Qd2 Rb8	
E85	1.d4 Nf6 2.c4 g6 3.Nc3 Bg7 4.e4 d6 5.f3 0-0 6.Be3 e5	
E86	1.d4 Nf6 2.c4 g6 3.Nc3 Bg7 4.e4 d6 5.f3 0-0 6.Be3 e5 7.Nge2 c6	
E87	1.d4 Nf6 2.c4 g6 3.Nc3 Bg7 4.e4 d6 5.f3 0-0 6.Be3 e5 7.d5	
E88	1.d4 Nf6 2.c4 g6 3.Nc3 Bg7 4.e4 d6 5.f3 0-0 6.Be3 e5 7.d5 c6	
E89	1.d4 Nf6 2.c4 g6 3.Nc3 Bg7 4.e4 d6 5.f3 0-0 6.Be3 e5 7.d5 c6 8.Nge2 cxd5 1.d4 Nf6 2.c4 g6 3.Nc3 Bg7 4.e4 d6 5.f3 0-0 6.Be3 e5 7.d5 c6 8.Nge2	
E90	1.d4 Nf6 2.c4 g6 3.Nc3 Bg7 4.e4 d6 5.Nf3	
E91	1.d4 Nf6 2.c4 g6 3.Nc3 Bg7 4.e4 d6 5.Nf3 0-0 6.Be2	
E92	1.d4 Nf6 2.c4 g6 3.Nc3 Bg7 4.e4 d6 5.Nf3 0-0 6.Be2 e5	
E93	1.d4 Nf6 2.c4 g6 3.Nc3 Bg7 4.e4 d6 5.Nf3 0-0 6.Be2 e5 7.d5 Nbd7	
E94	1.d4 Nf6 2.c4 g6 3.Nc3 Bg7 4.e4 d6 5.Nf3 0-0 6.Be2 e5 7.0-0	
E95	1.d4 Nf6 2.c4 g6 3.Nc3 Bg7 4.e4 d6 5.Nf3 0-0 6.Be2 e5 7.0-0 Nbd7 8.Re1; 1.d4 Nf6 2.c4 g6 3.Nc3 Bg7 4.e4 d6 5.Nf3 0-0 6.Be2 e5 7.0-0 Nbd7	
E96	1.d4 Nf6 2.c4 g6 3.Nc3 Bg7 4.e4 d6 5.Nf3 0-0 6.Be2 e5 7.0-0 Nbd7 8.Re1 c6 9.Bf1 a5 1.d4 Nf6 2.c4 g6 3.Nc3 Bg7 4.e4 d6 5.Nf3 0-0 6.Be2 e5 7.0-0 Nbd7 8.Re1	
E97	1.d4 Nf6 2.c4 g6 3.Nc3 Bg7 4.e4 d6 5.Nf3 0-0 6.Be2 e5 7.0-0 Nc6	
E98	1.d4 Nf6 2.c4 g6 3.Nc3 Bg7 4.e4 d6 5.Nf3 0-0 6.Be2 e5 7.0-0 Nc6 8.d5 Ne7 9.Ne1	
E99	1.d4 Nf6 2.c4 g6 3.Nc3 Bg7 4.e4 d6 5.Nf3 0-0 6.Be2 e5 7.0-0 Nc6 8.d5 Ne7 9.Ne1 Nd7 10.f3 f5 1.d4 Nf6 2.c4 g6 3.Nc3 Bg7 4.e4 d6 5.Nf3 0-0 6.Be2 e5 7.0-0 Nc6 8.d5 Ne7 9.Ne1 Nd7 10.f3	
