= Sicilian Defence, Chekhover Variation =

Position: a8 black rook, b8 black knight, c8 black bishop, d8 black queen, e8 black king, f8 black bishop, g8 black knight, h8 black rook, a7 black pawn, b7 black pawn, e7 black pawn, f7 black pawn, g7 black pawn, h7 black pawn, d6 black pawn, d4 white queen, e4 white pawn, f3 white knight, a2 white pawn, b2 white pawn, c2 white pawn, f2 white pawn, g2 white pawn, h2 white pawn, a1 white rook, b1 white knight, c1 white bishop, e1 white king, f1 white bishop, h1 white rook
- Moves: 1.e4 c5 2.Nf3 d6 3.d4 cxd4 4.Qxd4
- ECO: B53
- Named after: Vitaly Chekhover
- Parent: Open Sicilian
- Synonyms: Szily Variation; Hungarian Variation

The Sicilian Defence, Chekhover Variation (also sometimes called the Szily Variation or Hungarian Variation) is a chess opening named after Vitaly Chekhover, from the game Chekhover–Lisitsin, Leningrad 1938. It is defined by the moves:

1. e4 c5
2. Nf3 d6
3. d4 cxd4
4. Qxd4

On move four White ignores the standard opening principle to not develop the queen too early in the game. Although the Chekhover Variation is somewhat rare at grandmaster level, it is not uncommon among amateurs.

The Encyclopaedia of Chess Openings assigns code B53 to this opening.

== Main line: 4...Nc6 ==
Black's main response to the Chekhover Variation is 4...Nc6 immediately attacking White's queen, leading to:

- 5.Bb5 pinning the knight: 5...Bd7 6.Bxc6 Bxc6.
- 5.Qa4?! avoiding an exchange and keeping the light-square bishop.
- 5.Qe3 a non-ambitious reply, often played in conjunction with Be2, 0-0, Nc3 (with or without c4), and Bd2. This system has been coined the Harikrishna System by IM Alexandru-Bogdan Banzea, as it has recently been used by super grandmaster Pentala Harikrishna in over-the-board games with positive results as White.

== Other continuations ==
- 4...a6 prevents a future pin: 5.c4 Nc6 6.Qd1.
- 4...Bd7 prepares 5...Nc6.
- 4...Nf6 avoids exchanges and continues with development.

== Example games ==
- Evgeni Vasiukov vs. Loek van Wely, 2002
  1.e4 c5 2.Nf3 d6 3.d4 cxd4 4.Qxd4 Nc6 5.Bb5 Bd7 6.Bxc6 Bxc6 7.Nc3 Nf6 8.Bg5 e6 9.0-0-0 Be7 10.Rhe1 0-0 11.Kb1 Qa5 12.Qd2 Qa6 13.Nd4 Rfc8 14.f4 h6 15.h4 Qc4 16.g4 Kf8 17.f5 hxg5 18.hxg5 Nd7 19.fxe6 Ne5 20.Rh1 fxe6 21.b3 Qb4 22.Rh8 Kf7 23.Qf4 Bf6 24.Rh7 Kg8 25.gxf6 Kxh7 26.Qg5 Rc7 27.Nxe6 Rac8 28.fxg7 Kg8 29.Rh1 Bxe4 30.Rh8 Kf7 31.Nxc7 Qxc3 32.g8=Q
- Mikhail Tal vs. Robert Eugene Byrne, 1976
  1.e4 c5 2.Nf3 d6 3.d4 cxd4 4. Qxd4 Nc6 5.Bb5 Bd7 6.Bxc6 Bxc6 7.Nc3 Nf6 8.Bg5 e6 9.0-0-0 Be7 10.Rhe1 0-0 11.Qd2 Qa5 12.Nd4 Rac8 13.Kb1 Kh8 14.f4 h6 15.h4 hxg5 16.hxg5 Nxe4 17.Qd3 Bxg5 18.Nxe4 Bxe4 19.Rxe4 Bh6 20.g4 f5 21.Rxe6 Bxf4 22.Nxf5

== See also ==
- List of chess openings
- List of chess openings named after people
