= Jaenisch Gambit =

Chess opening

Position: a8 black rook, c8 black bishop, d8 black queen, e8 black king, f8 black bishop, g8 black knight, h8 black rook, a7 black pawn, b7 black pawn, c7 black pawn, d7 black pawn, g7 black pawn, h7 black pawn, c6 black knight, b5 white bishop, e5 black pawn, f5 black pawn, e4 white pawn, f3 white knight, a2 white pawn, b2 white pawn, c2 white pawn, d2 white pawn, f2 white pawn, g2 white pawn, h2 white pawn, a1 white rook, b1 white knight, c1 white bishop, d1 white queen, e1 white king, h1 white rook
- Moves: 1.e4 e5 2.Nf3 Nc6 3.Bb5 f5
- ECO: C63
- Parent: Ruy Lopez
- Synonym: Schliemann Defence

The Jaenisch Gambit, also known as the Schliemann Defence, is a chess opening that begins with the moves:

1. e4 e5
2. Nf3 Nc6
3. Bb5 f5

It is a sharp variation of the Ruy Lopez where Black frequently sacrifices one or two pawns. The most common replies are 4.Nc3 and 4.d3. The Jaenisch Gambit is considered to be a good practical weapon, but it is positionally risky, especially against a strong and prepared opponent. It is considered one of Black's most combative lines against the Ruy Lopez.

The variation was originated by Carl Jaenisch, who analysed it in the December 1847 issue of Le Palamède. In English-speaking countries, it is often known as the Schliemann Defence after Adolph Schliemann, who analyzed a different gambit in the Ruy Lopez, 3...Bc5 4.c3 f5.

The opening is assigned code C63 in the Encyclopaedia of Chess Openings.

== History ==
The Ruy Lopez did not gain widespread popularity until the mid-19th century, when Finnish-Russian theoretician Carl Jaenisch published a detailed article on 1.e4 e5 in the December 1847 issue of Le Palamède, where the Jaenisch Gambit was one of the lines discussed. The name "Schliemann Defence" has been common in English-language sources ever since the Handbuch des Schachspiels named this line after German lawyer Adolph Schliemann (1817–1872), even though the line Schliemann actually advocated for in the 1860s was a gambit variation of the Cordel Defence (3...Bc5 4.c3 f5). Thus several authors note that the line is more accurately attributed to Jaenisch, and the gambit is named after Jaenisch in Russian and German. Nevertheless, many English-language works continue to use the term "Schliemann Defence" instead of or alongside "Jaenisch Gambit".

In the 1970s, Jozef Boey employed the Jaenisch Gambit against the Ruy Lopez in his games in the ICCF Correspondence Chess World Championship final. He co-authored a survey on the Jaenisch Gambit in the New In Chess Yearbook, volume 116.

Teimour Radjabov is currently the only top player who regularly employs the line, with mixed results.

== 4.Nc3 ==
4.Nc3 is a more aggressive move than 4.d3. However, White needs to learn a lot of theory in order to get the advantage. Play usually continues 4...fxe4 5.Nxe4 and then either 5...d5 or 5...Nf6.

=== 4...fxe4 5.Nxe4 d5 ===
4...fxe4 5.Nxe4 d5 leads to the most heavily analysed variations of the gambit, though it has become less common with the rise of 5...Nf6.

==== 6.Nxe5 dxe4 7.Nxc6 Qg5 ====
Position: a8 black rook, c8 black bishop, e8 black king, f8 black bishop, g8 black knight, h8 black rook, a7 black pawn, b7 black pawn, c7 black pawn, g7 black pawn, h7 black pawn, c6 white knight, b5 white bishop, g5 black queen, e4 black pawn, a2 white pawn, b2 white pawn, c2 white pawn, d2 white pawn, f2 white pawn, g2 white pawn, h2 white pawn, a1 white rook, c1 white bishop, d1 white queen, e1 white king, h1 white rook

4.Nc3 fxe4 5.Nxe4 d5 6.Nxe5 dxe4 7.Nxc6 Qg5

Position: c8 black king, d8 black rook, h8 black rook, a7 black pawn, b7 black pawn, g7 black pawn, h7 black pawn, c6 black pawn, d6 black bishop, e6 black bishop, f6 black knight, e5 white knight, g5 white bishop, c4 white bishop, d4 white pawn, e4 black pawn, g3 white pawn, h3 black queen, a2 white pawn, b2 white pawn, c2 white pawn, e2 white queen, h2 white pawn, c1 white king, d1 white rook, h1 white rook

8.Qe2 Nf6 9.f4 Qxf4 10.Ne5+ c6 11.d4 Qh4+ 12.g3 Qh3 13.Bc4 Be6 14.Bg5 0-0-0 15.0-0-0 Bd6

After 7...Qg5, the main line continues 8.Qe2 Nf6 9.f4 Qxf4 10.Ne5+ (discovered check) c6 11.d4 Qh4+ 12.g3 Qh3, which was played in the game Timman vs Speelman, Candidates semi-final in London in 1989. The line can be reached with several move orders. For example, 9.Ne5+ transposes to the main line after 9...c6 10.f4 Qxf4.

White's alternatives include 10.d4, which often transposes to the main line but gives Black the option of 10...Qd6; 9.Nxa7+, which has been played by Peter Svidler; 10.Nxa7+, a similar but distinct line to 9.Nxa7+; and retreating with 8.Nd4+ c6 9.Bf1.

==== Möhring Variation: 7...Qd5 ====
7...Qd5 attacks White's bishop while also pressuring White's knight. The usual response is 8.c4, defending the bishop and attacking the queen, followed by 8...Qd6 and then 9.Nxa7+ or 9.Qh5+.

=== 4...fxe4 5.Nxe4 Nf6 ===
After 4.Nc3 fxe4 5.Nxe4, 5...Nf6 has increased in popularity to the point that is now often considered the main line. Black commits to a pawn sacrifice after 6.Nxf6 Qxf6 7.Qe2 Be7 8.Bxc6 bxc6 (or 8...dxc6) 9.Nxe5.

== 4.d3 ==
Position: a8 black rook, c8 black bishop, d8 black queen, e8 black king, f8 black bishop, h8 black rook, a7 black pawn, b7 black pawn, c7 black pawn, d7 black pawn, g7 black pawn, h7 black pawn, c6 black knight, f6 black knight, b5 white bishop, e5 black pawn, e4 white pawn, f3 white knight, a2 white pawn, b2 white pawn, c2 white pawn, f2 white pawn, g2 white pawn, h2 white pawn, a1 white rook, b1 white knight, c1 white bishop, d1 white queen, f1 white rook, g1 white king

4.d3 fxe4 5.dxe4 Nf6 6.0-0

4.d3 simply defends the e-pawn while avoiding the complications of the 4.Nc3 line, and has surpassed 4.Nc3 in popularity in recent years. The main continuation is 4...fxe4 5.dxe4 Nf6. White then usually plays 6.0-0, preventing the pin (if 6.Nc3 is played) or check 6...Bb4. Black has a major choice between 6...Bc5, an aggressive continuation, and 6...d6, which simply prevents White from capturing the e-pawn.

=== 4...fxe4 5.dxe4 Nf6 6.0-0 Bc5 ===
After 6...Bc5, White has a choice between 7.Bxc6, 7.Qd3, 7.Nc3, 7.Qe2, 7.Bg5, and 7.Bc4.

After 7.Bxc6, a line that has been played many times is 7...bxc6 8.Nxe5 0-0 9.Nc3 d6, followed by 10.Na4 or 10.Nd3 (10.Nxc6 is inferior). White gains a pawn, but Black gains the bishop pair and activity in return. It seems to be the most critical option for White.

==== 7.Bxc6 bxc6 8.Nxe5 0-0 9.Nc3 d6 10.Na4 ====
After 10.Na4, Black's most common reply is 10...Qe8, after which the knight must retreat with 11.Nd3. Black can then play 11...Bg4, leading to the relatively forcing continuation 12.Qe1 Bd4 13.c3 Bb6, after which 14.Nxb6 is the most popular choice, though 14.h3 is a popular alternative.

==== 10.Nd3 ====
10.Nd3 is an alternative for White. It tends to continue 10...Bd4 and then 11.Qe1 Qe8 12.Be3 Bxc3 13.Qxc3 Qxe4, returning the pawn, or alternatively 11.Ne2 Bb6 12.Bg5 Qe8 13.Bxf6 Rxf6 14.Ng3.

==== 9...Ba6 ====
9...Ba6 is Black's main alternative to the main line with 9...d6 following 6...Bc5. White usually replies with 10.Nd3, blocking the bishop's line of attack on White's rook and threatening Black's other bishop. Play then tends to continue with 10...Bb6, most often followed by 11.Bg5, or 10...Bd4, usually followed by 11.e5.

==== Other lines ====
- After 7.Nc3, a promising continuation for Black is 7...0-0 8.Bg5 d6 9.Nd5 Kh8.

=== 4...fxe4 5.dxe4 Nf6 6.0-0 d6 ===
After 6...d6, the best regarded response for White is 7.Bc4, where Black has some difficulties in development and usually ends up castling queenside. 7.Nc3 is also popular and most natural, but not as challenging for Black.

The main continuation after 7.Bc4 is 7...Bg4, preventing 8.Ng5. 7...Na5 and 7...h6 are also possible; 7...Be7?? is a blunder.

=== Black's fourth-move alternatives ===
- 4...Nf6 is the main alternative to 4...fxe4. Transposition to the main line is frequent after 5.0-0 fxe4 5.dxe4.

== White's fourth-move alternatives ==
- Accepting the gambit with 4.exf5 is inferior to 4.Nc3 and 4.d3. After 4...e4 5.Qe2 Qe7 6.Bxc6 dxc6 7.Nd4 Nh6, Black has the better game.
- Though 5.d4 is the main move against the Deferred Jaenisch Gambit (3...a6 4.Ba4 f5), 4.d4 is not as effective against the standard Jaenisch Gambit. After the usual 4...fxe4, play may continue 5.Nxe5 Nxe5 6.dxe5 and then 6...c6, kicking White's bishop and preparing for a potential 7...Qa5+. Another possibility for White is 5.Bxc6.
- 4.Bxc6 and 4.Qe2 are two more rarely seen moves.
