= Marshall Attack =

Position: a8 black rook, c8 black bishop, d8 black queen, f8 black rook, g8 black king, c7 black pawn, e7 black bishop, f7 black pawn, g7 black pawn, h7 black pawn, a6 black pawn, c6 black knight, f6 black knight, b5 black pawn, d5 black pawn, e5 black pawn, e4 white pawn, b3 white bishop, c3 white pawn, f3 white knight, a2 white pawn, b2 white pawn, d2 white pawn, f2 white pawn, g2 white pawn, h2 white pawn, a1 white rook, b1 white knight, c1 white bishop, d1 white queen, e1 white rook, g1 white king
- Moves: 1.e4 e5 2.Nf3 Nc6 3.Bb5 a6 4.Ba4 Nf6 5.0-0 Be7 6.Re1 b5 7.Bb3 0-0 8.c3 d5
- ECO: C89
- Parent: Ruy Lopez
- Synonyms: Marshall Counterattack; Marshall Gambit

The Marshall Attack (also called Marshall Counterattack, and Marshall Gambit) is a chess opening characterised by the moves:

1. e4 e5
2. Nf3 Nc6
3. Bb5 a6
4. Ba4 Nf6
5. 0-0 Be7
6. Re1 b5
7. Bb3 0-0
8. c3 d5

The Marshall Attack is an aggressive line in the Ruy Lopez, Closed Defence, where Black sacrifices a pawn by playing d5 to gain initiative and a kingside attack. Frank Marshall famously debuted it in his game against José Raúl Capablanca in 1918. Although Marshall lost the game, the opening gained popularity and was adopted by many top players, still seeing use today at the top level by players such as Levon Aronian and Ding Liren. It is of particular theoretical importance as a way for Black to play actively and avoid the so-called "Spanish Torture" of the Closed Ruy Lopez. Moreover, it has led to the development of several "Anti-Marshall" lines designed to avoid it.

== History ==
The Marshall Attack had been played before 1918 by lesser-known players and possibly by Marshall himself in 1917. Its most famous game, called "one of the most famous games in history" by Chessbase Chess News, is Capablanca vs. Marshall, played in 1918 at the Manhattan Chess Club in New York. It is often said that Marshall had secretly prepared the gambit for use against Capablanca since his defeat in their 1909 match, though this is unproven. The most common counterclaim is that Marshall had used a similar approach in 1917, playing the Steiner Variation against Walter Frere. However, chess historian Edward Winter found no clear evidence of the date for the Frere game; there are several games between 1910 and 1918 where Marshall passed up opportunities to use the Marshall Attack against Capablanca. In a game played in Havana in 1893, four Cuban amateurs in consultation played the Marshall against the visiting Carl Walbrodt, following up with the dubious 9...e4?!.

Since its debut, many top players have adopted the opening and further developed its theory, notably Boris Spassky in his 1965 match against Mikhail Tal. An important improvement over Marshall's game against Capablanca was 11...c6 instead of 11...Nf6. The theory of the Marshall has continued to evolve, some lines having been analysed to move 30 or more. The Marshall requires considerable preparation and theoretical knowledge. Between two well-prepared players, the usual result is a draw. Many top players avoid the Marshall as White because of this drawing tendency, rather than to avoid complications.

== Theory ==
Position after 14...Qh3

Position: a8 black rook, c8 black bishop, f8 black rook, g8 black king, f7 black pawn, g7 black pawn, h7 black pawn, a6 black pawn, c6 black pawn, d6 black bishop, b5 black pawn, d5 black knight, d4 white pawn, b3 white bishop, c3 white pawn, g3 white pawn, h3 black queen, a2 white pawn, b2 white pawn, f2 white pawn, h2 white pawn, a1 white rook, b1 white knight, c1 white bishop, d1 white queen, e1 white rook, g1 white king

Main continuation in the Marshall Attack, illustrating Black's kingside attack

The main line of the Marshall extends to move 14, though multiple variations exist for both White and Black.

9.exd5

9.d3 is harmless – Black can easily equalise with 9...dxe4 10.dxe4 Qxd1 11.Bxd1. If 9.d4, 9...exd4 10.e5 Ne4 11.cxd4 Bf5 is also satisfactory for Black.

9...Nxd5

9...e4!?, the Herman Steiner Variation, is not considered sound. After 10.dxc6 exf3 the principled move 11.d4! leads to an advantage for White.

10.Nxe5

Alternatives include:

- 10.d3 Bg4 11.Qe2 Rb8, setting the trap 12.Qe4? Nf6! 13.Qxc6? Rb6 14.Nxe5 Bd6−+ (Yudovich)
- 10.d4 exd4 11.cxd4 Bg4 12.Nc3 Nf6 =/+ (Simagin–Lilienthal, Parnu 1947)
- 10.a4 Bb7 11.axb5 axb5 12.Rxa8 Bxa8 13.Na3 Na5 with a complicated position (Balashov–Tseitlin, USSR ch 1970)

10...Nxe5 11.Rxe5 c6

This move was found independently by Marshall and by Stuart Milner-Barry in the late 1930s. Marshall originally played 11...Nf6 in the famous 1918 game against Capablanca, who defended accurately to win. Later, Marshall experimented with 11...Bb7 before coming to the conclusion that 11...c6 is best, and since at least the late 1940s it has been regarded as the main line.

- 11...Bb7 is the main alternative to 11...c6 and is still occasionally played at grandmaster level. The main line continues 12.d4 Bf6 13.Re1 Re8 (Mukhin–Romanishin, Vilnius 1971). White is generally able to finish development and consolidate, though Black retains some positional compensation for the pawn in the form of the bishop pair and open lines. A sharp alternative is 12.Qf3!? Bd6! 13.Bxd5 (not 13.Rxd5? Re8 −/+) c6 14.Re2 cxd5 15.d4 Qc7 and again Black has reasonable compensation for the pawn (Tukmakov–Tseitlin, USSR Armed Forces Team Championship 1973).
- 11...Nf6 is not considered fully adequate after 12.d4 Bd6 13.Re1 (13.Re2 is also good) Ng4 (not 13...Bxh2+? 14.Kxh2 Ng4+ 15.Kg1 Qh4 16.Qf3 and Black has nothing for the piece) 14.h3 Qh4 15.Qf3 (not 15.hxg4?? Qh2+ 16.Kf1 Qh1+ 17.Ke2 Bxg4+ −+) and now Black's best chance is 15...h5, although White still has the advantage with correct play. In the Capablanca–Marshall game, which reached this position by transposition, Marshall played the tempting knight sacrifice 15...Nxf2?, which proved to be incorrect after 16.Re2 Bg4 17.hxg4 Bh2+ 18.Kf1 Bg3 19.Rxf2 Qh1+ 20.Ke2 Bxf2 (no better is 20...Qxc1 21.Qxg3 Qxb2+ 22.Kd3! Qxa1 23.Kc2+− [Tartakover]) 21.Bd2! Bh4 22.Qh3 Rae8+ 23.Kd3 Qf1+ 24.Kc2 and Black's attack has run out of steam, leaving White with an overwhelming material advantage. The game concluded 24...Bf2 25.Qf3 Qg1 26.Bd5 c5 27.dxc5 Bxc5 28.b4 Bd6 29.a4 a5 30.axb5 axb4 31.Ra6 bxc3 32.Nxc3 Bb4 33.b6 Bxc3 34.Bxc3 h6 35.b7 Re3 36.Bxf7+ 1–0
- 11...Nf4 (Balogh Variation) with the idea of 12.d4 Ng6. This costs a tempo compared to the main line, and White is better after either 13.Rh5 Bb7 14.Qg4 Re8 15.Be3 Nf8 16.Nd2 Bf6 (Suta–Dalko, correspondence Olympiad 1969–70) or 13.Re1 Bb7 14.Nd2 c5 15.Nf3 c4 16.Bc2 f5 17.Ne5 Qd5 18.f3 (Bondarevsky–Balogh, correspondence 1962–63).
- 11...Nb6 seeks to discourage a2–a4. It is less active than the alternatives but is probably sufficient to draw. After 12.d4 Bd6 13.Bg5 Qd7 14.Re1 Bb7 15.Nd2 Rae8 16.Bh4 Rxe1+ 17.Qxe1 Re8 Black was able to hold in Bertok–Stein, Stockholm 1962.

12.d4 Bd6 13.Re1 Qh4 14.g3 Qh3 (see diagram)

White's kingside has lost an important defender in the f3-knight and Black gets the initiative with threats against the white king (see diagram). Black's ideas are playing 15...Bg4 with tempo, developing with ...Rae8 (and possibly playing ...Re6–h6) and playing ...f5 followed by ...f4 to activate the dark-square bishop on d6.

Position: a8 black rook, c8 black bishop, f8 black rook, g8 black king, f7 black pawn, g7 black pawn, h7 black pawn, a6 black pawn, c6 black pawn, d6 black bishop, b5 black pawn, d5 black knight, d4 white pawn, b3 white bishop, c3 white pawn, e3 white bishop, g3 white pawn, h3 black queen, a2 white pawn, b2 white pawn, f2 white pawn, h2 white pawn, a1 white rook, b1 white knight, d1 white queen, e1 white rook, g1 white king

15.Be3, White's older and more common response, has the idea of 15...Bg4 16.Qd3 with the idea of developing the knight to d2 and from there to either f3 or f1 to aid the defence.

Position: a8 black rook, c8 black bishop, f8 black rook, g8 black king, f7 black pawn, h7 black pawn, a6 black pawn, c6 black pawn, d6 black bishop, b5 black pawn, d5 black knight, g5 black pawn, d4 white pawn, e4 white rook, b3 white bishop, c3 white pawn, g3 white pawn, h3 black queen, a2 white pawn, b2 white pawn, f2 white pawn, h2 white pawn, a1 white rook, b1 white knight, c1 white bishop, d1 white queen, g1 white king

In this unclear position following 15.Re4 g5!?, White's best move is 16.Qf1, and after 16...Qh5 17.Nd2 Bf5, the sacrificial 18.f3! complicates the position.

White's two primary lines are the older, more principled 15.Be3 (first diagram), developing and cutting off the e-file, and the newer, sharper line 15.Re4 g5!? (second diagram), inviting Black into a risky middlegame where White often sacrifices the exchange to build up defences.

White suffers from an under-developed queenside and faces some difficulties developing their remaining knight since the pawn on c3 blocks its most natural development square. However, White may reach an endgame with a pawn advantage if they are able to neutralise Black's initiative and stabilise. To this end, White often plays a4 to break up Black's pawn structure and get their a1-rook into the game.

In top-level games, the Marshall Attack has a very high draw rate, however, as Black's compensation for the pawn is excellent, and with precise play, White can avoid the initiative and trade down into an equal endgame where neither side has winning chances. In amateur play, Black has excellent chances if the opponent is unprepared or plays imprecisely, as Black's attack is very natural and easy to play.

== Anti-Marshalls ==
The name "anti-Marshall" is commonly associated with the move 8.a4, or more generally with any move other than 8.c3. 8.a4 was the most popular anti-Marshall for many years owing to Garry Kasparov's victory over Nigel Short in the 1993 World Chess Championship. Since then, however, the viability of 8...b4 in response to 8.a4 has been demonstrated, leading to an increase in popularity for 8.h3. Other "anti-Marshall" moves include 8.d4, 8.d3, 8.Bd5, 8.Nc3 and 8.a3.
