= Sicilian Defence, Najdorf Variation =

Chess opening

Najdorf Variation
Position: a8 black rook, b8 black knight, c8 black bishop, d8 black queen, e8 black king, f8 black bishop, h8 black rook, b7 black pawn, e7 black pawn, f7 black pawn, g7 black pawn, h7 black pawn, a6 black pawn, d6 black pawn, f6 black knight, d4 white knight, e4 white pawn, c3 white knight, a2 white pawn, b2 white pawn, c2 white pawn, f2 white pawn, g2 white pawn, h2 white pawn, a1 white rook, c1 white bishop, d1 white queen, e1 white king, f1 white bishop, h1 white rook
- Moves: 1.e4 c5 2.Nf3 d6 3.d4 cxd4 4.Nxd4 Nf6 5.Nc3 a6
- ECO: B90–B99
- Named after: Miguel Najdorf
- Parent: Open Sicilian

The Najdorf Variation (/ˈnaɪdɔːrf/ NY-dorf) is a variation of the Sicilian Defence that begins with the moves:

1. e4 c5
2. Nf3 d6
3. d4 cxd4
4. Nxd4 Nf6
5. Nc3 a6

Black's 5...a6 aims to deny the b5-square to White's knights and light-square bishop while maintaining flexible development. Games in the Najdorf frequently feature opposite-side castling, where White castles long and both sides launch simultaneous attacks on their opponents' kings, with Black often planning a queenside minority attack. This is often carried out by means of ...b5, ...Bb7, and placing a knight on d5, or c4 via b6.

The Najdorf is one of the most popular, reputable, and deeply studied of all chess openings. Modern Chess Openings calls it the "Cadillac" or "Rolls-Royce" of chess openings. The opening is named after the Polish-Argentine grandmaster Miguel Najdorf, although he was not the first strong player to play the variation. Many top players have relied on the Najdorf, including Bobby Fischer, Garry Kasparov, and Maxime Vachier-Lagrave.

== History and development ==
Players began experimenting with 5...a6 in the 1920s, often transposing to the Scheveningen after a subsequent ...e6. If Black plays 5...e5?! immediately, then after 6.Bb5+! Bd7 (or 6...Nbd7 7.Nf5) 7.Bxd7+ Nbxd7 (or Qxd7) 8.Nf5, the knight on f5 is difficult to dislodge without concessions, which motivated the development of the Najdorf. The Czech chess master Karel Opočenský was among the first to combine 5...a6 with ...e5, and in an attempt to have the variation named after him, claimed to have shown it to Miguel Najdorf himself. However, Najdorf was a stronger player and, with the help of other strong Argentine players in the 1950s, deepened the analysis of the opening. He played it as early as 1937.

it was Miguel who realized that in this position the move 5...a6 was always useful for Black. If it is not played on the fifth move it will be played on the seventh or the fourteenth. So then, being a practical person, he thought 'if you have to do something at 7:00AM or at 9:00 or at 10:00, better do it as soon as you get up, and get it over with'.

Ironically, Najdorf would abandon the variation later when the theory developed to become very sophisticated:

"Here comes some kid who's memorized the moves and he kills me. He arrives with his books, he gets me into something I don't know and Najdorf dies at the hands of the Najdorf Variation." So from then on he played something else. A Ruy Lopez as Black, something classic in which the other had to know how to play chess to beat him.

6.Bg5 is an aggressive attempt by White to refute the opening and was regarded as the main line until the 1980s when its use began to decline. Bobby Fischer, who called the Najdorf "one of the greatest creations in chess theory", favoured the Lipnitzky/Fischer Attack (6.Bc4) for much of his career. He won numerous games with it as White, though in the following years counterattacking approaches were found for Black that led to its decline, though a modern variation (7...Nbd7) caused a resurgence and it appeared in the 1993 PCA World Championship match between Garry Kasparov and Nigel Short. Anatoly Karpov faced the Najdorf many times with the white pieces, and frequently opted for the Classical/Opočenský Variation (6.Be2) (inspired by Efim Geller, who acted as Karpov’s second). The Classical Variation aims to castle kingside for a more positional game, which suited Karpov's style. He contributed both to the theory and the popularity of the variation while at his peak, finding ways to exploit the weakness of the d5-square created by the Black's move 6...e5. Garry Kasparov would often transpose to the Scheveningen (6...e6) to avoid this problem when the two competed for the World Championships. In the 1980s and 1990s, a number of English players (John Nunn, Nigel Short, and Murray Chandler) began using an approach previously tried against other Sicilian variations, such as the Dragon. The English Attack, named for them, involves 6.Be3, and often leads to opposite-side castling with both sides launching a simultaneous pawn storm on opposite sides of the board. This approach has become the modern mainline and is seen regularly at the highest level.

== Variations ==
=== 6.Bg5 ===
==== Classical Main line: 6...e6 ====
Position: a8 black rook, b8 black knight, c8 black bishop, d8 black queen, e8 black king, f8 black bishop, h8 black rook, b7 black pawn, f7 black pawn, g7 black pawn, h7 black pawn, a6 black pawn, d6 black pawn, e6 black pawn, f6 black knight, g5 white bishop, d4 white knight, e4 white pawn, f4 white pawn, c3 white knight, a2 white pawn, b2 white pawn, c2 white pawn, g2 white pawn, h2 white pawn, a1 white rook, d1 white queen, e1 white king, f1 white bishop, h1 white rook

Classical Main line after 6...e6 7.f4

The main move. In the early days of the Najdorf 7.Qf3 was popular, but the reply 7...h6 did not allow White to obtain any advantage. Nowadays, White players almost universally respond with the move: 7.f4. White threatens 8.e5, but Black has several options:

- 7...Be7 8.Qf3 and now:
  - 8...Qc7 9.0-0-0 Nbd7, this is called the old main line. At this point White usually responds with 10.g4 or 10.Bd3. After each of these moves there is a huge body of opening theory.
  - 8...h6 9.Bh4 g5. This is known as the Argentine/Goteborg Variation. It was first played in round 14 of 1955 Goteborg Interzonal simultaneously by Argentine players Panno, Pilnik, and Najdorf who were facing the Soviet grandmasters Geller, Spassky, and Keres. The games in question proceeded as follows: 10.fxg5 Nfd7 (Black aims to route a knight to e5, and then back it up by a knight at d7 or c6) 11.Nxe6!? (Efim Geller's discovery) 11...fxe6 12.Qh5+ Kf8 13.Bb5. Here Panno played 13...Ne5, while Pilnik and Najdorf chose 13...Kg7; however, all three Argentine players lost in very short order and the line was, for a while, considered refuted. In 1958 Bobby Fischer played 13...Rh7!, versus Svetozar Gligorić at the Portorož Interzonal, in a critical last-round game. According to modern opening theory, this position is a draw at best for White.
- 7...Qb6 one of the most popular choices at master level.
  - 8.Qd2 the extremely complicated Poisoned Pawn Variation: 8...Qxb2 9.Rb1 (9.Nb3 is the other less common option) 9...Qa3 and here White has played both 10.f5 and 10.e5. Both lead to extremely sharp play where the slightest inaccuracy is fatal for either side. Since 2006, when it was played in several high-level games, 10.e5 has become very popular. From the standpoint of the theory, it is regarded as White's only attempt to play for a win against the Poisoned Pawn Variation since all other variations (and that includes the other pawn move, 10.f5) have been analysed to a draw with the best play. An example is a game Vallejo Pons–Kasparov, Moscow 2004, which was called "a model modern grandmaster draw!" by Kasparov himself in Revolution in the 70s (page 164).
  - 8.Nb3 White opts for a quiet game, but Black has nothing to worry about: 8...Be7 9.Qf3 Nbd7 10.0-0-0 Qc7 where we have reached a set-up very similar to that of the old main line mentioned above. Without the d4-knight, however, White will find it very hard to organize an attack.
  - 8.Qd3 is a modified version of the Poisoned Pawn Variation, often played to pose different challenges from what an opponent might be used to after Qd2. After 8...Qxb2 9.Rb1 Qa3, a key point is that the queen on d3 allows for future potential discovered attacks on Black's queen. It is less popular than Qd2, however, as the queen covers more useful squares on d2.
  - 8.a3 is a more challenging reply for White. It protects the pawn indirectly as 8...Qxb2?? is met by 9.Na4! trapping the queen. Black usually plays 8...Nc6, although 8...Nbd7 is also playable. The 8.a3 line has been seen several times at the grandmaster level recently.
- 7...b5 the ultra-sharp Polugaevsky Variation. Black ignores White's threat and expands on the queenside. 8.e5 dxe5 9.fxe5 Qc7 here White either plays 10.exf6 Qe5+ 11.Be2 Qxg5 or 10.Qe2 Nfd7 11.0-0-0 Bb7.
- 7...Qc7 championed by Garry Kasparov before he switched to playing 7...Qb6 exclusively.
- 7...Nbd7 popularised by Boris Gelfand.
- 7...Nc6?! is risky and of a dubious theoretical reputation due to the response: 8.e5!
- 7...h6!? leads to the Poisoned Pawn Deferred following 8.Bh4 Qb6. The most popular move then is 9.a3, which was played twice in the 2016 London Chess Classic (Caruana–Nakamura and Nakamura–Vachier-Lagrave), though White won both games.

==== 6...Nbd7 ====
Position: a8 black rook, c8 black bishop, d8 black queen, e8 black king, f8 black bishop, h8 black rook, b7 black pawn, d7 black knight, e7 black pawn, f7 black pawn, g7 black pawn, h7 black pawn, a6 black pawn, d6 black pawn, f6 black knight, g5 white bishop, c4 white bishop, d4 white knight, e4 white pawn, c3 white knight, a2 white pawn, b2 white pawn, c2 white pawn, f2 white pawn, g2 white pawn, h2 white pawn, a1 white rook, d1 white queen, e1 white king, h1 white rook

6...Nbd7 7.Bc4

Historically speaking, this was the usual reply until the mid-1960s, when the rejoinder 7.Bc4 put the move "out of business". Recently, however, the line has seen a resurgence in high-level play. The idea for Black is to postpone ...e6 to retain more dynamic options (for example, to play ...e7–e5 in one move). The most important developments include:

- 7.Bc4 Qb6 This is a move introduced by Leinier Dominguez. The idea is to win a tempo by attacking b2, after which Black can finish his development beginning 8...e6. The last word on the line has not yet been given. The whole variation with 6...Nbd7 is covered in the book by Ľubomír Ftáčnik in the chapter "Blood Diamond".
- 7.f4 Qc7 8.Qf3:
  - 8...h6 9.Bh4 e5. The idea is to gain time over ...e6 by playing ...e7–e5 in one move. Later on it turned out that 9...g5! is even better. (This variation is covered by Ufuk Tuncer and Twan Burg in New In Chess, Yearbook 102.)
  - 8...b5. With the idea of fianchettoing the bishop to b7. (The variation is covered by Ufuk Tuncer in New In Chess, Yearbook 101.)
- A modern way to meet 7.f4 or 7.Qe2 is 7...g6. Black’s idea is to castle kingside quickly and start attacking with ...b5–b4, wasting no time with the e-pawn.

=== English Attack: 6.Be3 ===
Position: a8 black rook, b8 black knight, c8 black bishop, d8 black queen, e8 black king, f8 black bishop, h8 black rook, b7 black pawn, e7 black pawn, f7 black pawn, g7 black pawn, h7 black pawn, a6 black pawn, d6 black pawn, f6 black knight, d4 white knight, e4 white pawn, c3 white knight, e3 white bishop, a2 white pawn, b2 white pawn, c2 white pawn, f2 white pawn, g2 white pawn, h2 white pawn, a1 white rook, d1 white queen, e1 white king, f1 white bishop, h1 white rook

English Attack: 6.Be3

This has become the modern main line. Since the early 1990s, the English Attack, 6.Be3 followed by f3, g4, Qd2 and 0-0-0 in some order, has become extremely popular and has been intensively analysed. Four lines are then usual for Black:

- The classical 6...e5:
  - If White plays 7.Nb3, then Black usually continues 7...Be6, trying to control the d5-square. The most common move is then 8.f3, allowing White to play Qd2 next move. If White had tried to play 8.Qd2, then Black could respond with 8...Ng4.
  - But if White plays 7.Nf3, then Black's main choices are 7...Be7 and 7...Qc7.
- Trying to transpose to the Scheveningen by playing 6...e6. White can either opt for the standard English Attack by playing 7.f3 or try the even sharper Hungarian Attack (also known as Perenyi Attack) by playing 7.g4. Black can revert to 7...e5, attempting to show that moving the g-pawn has created an overextension for White. After 8.Nf5 g6 9.g5 the game is dynamically balanced.
- The knight move: 6...Ng4. White continues: 7.Bg5 h6 8.Bh4 g5 9.Bg3 Bg7, but the nature of this position is quite different from the ones arising after 6...e6 and 6...e5, so sometimes White tries to avoid the knight jump by playing 6.f3 instead of 6.Be3. However, aside from eliminating the option to play the Hungarian Attack mentioned above, it gives Black other possibilities such as 6...Qb6 and 6...b5.
- 6...Nbd7. The objective of this move is to get into the English Attack while avoiding the Perenyi Attack. 7.g4 is less dangerous now because with 6...Nbd7 Black is more flexible as the bishop on c8 can attack g4 now and the knight on d7 can jump to interesting squares.

=== Fischer–Sozin/Lipnitzky Attack: 6.Bc4 ===
Introduced by Veniamin Sozin in the 1930s, this received little attention until Fischer regularly adopted it, and it was a frequent guest at the top level through the 1970s. White plays 6.Bc4 with the idea of playing against f7, so Black usually counters with 6...e6 7.Bb3 b5. The Sozin has become less popular because of 7...Nbd7 where Black intends to follow up with ...Nc5 later. It is possible to avoid the 7...Nbd7 option with 7.0-0, but this cuts out the aggressive possibility of castling long.

=== Classical/Opočenský Variation: 6.Be2 ===
Because of the success of various players with these variations, White often plays 6.Be2 and goes for a quieter, more positional game, whereupon Black has the option of transposing into a Scheveningen Variation by playing 6...e6 or keeping the game in Najdorf lines by playing 6...e5. Another option is to play 6...Nbd7.

=== Amsterdam Variation: 6.f4 ===
Position: a8 black rook, b8 black knight, c8 black bishop, d8 black queen, e8 black king, f8 black bishop, h8 black rook, b7 black pawn, e7 black pawn, f7 black pawn, g7 black pawn, h7 black pawn, a6 black pawn, d6 black pawn, f6 black knight, d4 white knight, e4 white pawn, f4 white pawn, c3 white knight, a2 white pawn, b2 white pawn, c2 white pawn, g2 white pawn, h2 white pawn, a1 white rook, c1 white bishop, d1 white queen, e1 white king, f1 white bishop, h1 white rook

Amsterdam Variation: 6.f4

Some lines include:

- 6...e5 7.Nf3 Nbd7 8.a4 Be7 9.Bd3 0-0
- 6...Qc7 7.Bd3
- 6...e6 7.Be2

GM Daniel King recommends 6...g6 against the Amsterdam Variation, leading to a more defensive kingside pawn structure. The idea is to eventually counterattack on the g1–a7 diagonal with a move like ...Qb6, preventing White from castling. An example line would be 6...g6 7.Nf3 Bg7 8.a4 Nc6 (note 8...Nc6 as opposed to the usual Najdorf ...Nbd7, as c6 is a more flexible square for the knight with a queen on b6) 9.Bd3 Qb6.

=== Adams Attack: 6.h3 ===
Introduced by Weaver Adams during the middle of the twentieth century, this odd-looking pawn move has mostly been used as a surprise weapon to combat the Najdorf. Should Black continue with 6...e5 anyway, White can respond with 7.Nde2 following up with g4 and Ng3, fighting for the weak light squares by playing g5. It is thus recommended that Black prevents g4 altogether with 7...h5.

Black can also employ a Scheveningen set-up with 6...e6 followed by 7.g4 b5 8.Bg2 Bb7, forcing White to lose more time by defending the e4-pawn, since ...b4 is a threat. It was not until early 2008 that an answer to Black was finally found. After 9.0-0 b4, White has the positional sacrifice 10.Nd5!, which gives Black long-term weaknesses and an open e-file for White to play on. Since then, it has been popular on all levels of play.

=== Other sixth moves for White ===
A notable feature of the Najdorf is the sheer amount of potential white replies – Grandmasters have played 22 different responses to 5...a6. Beside the main lines mentioned above, 6.f3, 6.g3, and 6.a4 are also respected responses to the Najdorf. Moves such as 6.Bd3, 6.Qf3, 6.Rg1 (the Freak Attack), 6.Nb3, 6.a3, 6.h4, 6.Qe2, 6.Qf3, and 6.Qd3 are rarely played, but are not considered bad and may be used for surprise value. Other very rare moves include 6.g4, 6.Nf3, 6.b3, 6.Qd2, and 6.Bd2.

== Notable games ==
- Wolfgang Unzicker vs. Bobby Fischer. 0–1. Varna Olympiad Final-A (1962). Classical/Opočenský Variation. A nineteen-year-old Fischer outplays his opponent in a more positional line.
- Michael Adams vs. Garry Kasparov. 0–1. Linares (2005). English Attack. Both players attack simultaneously and Kasparov claimed later that it was important to let his opponent think he was winning.
- Sergey Karjakin vs. Viswanathan Anand. 0–1. Corus Group A (2006), Wijk aan Zee. English Attack. Anand sacrifices a knight and a bishop and Karjakin resigns with checkmate unstoppable.
- Morezevich vs Vachier-Lagrave. 0-1. Biel (2009). 6. f3. Facing a dangerous attack, MVL's "zombie rook" is hopelessly entombed and en prise on h7, but it comes back to life later to win the game for Black.
- Shakhriyar Mamedyarov vs. Boris Gelfand. 0–1. Candidates (2011), Kazan. Fischer-Sozin Attack: Flank Variation. After various sacrifices, Gelfand has six extra pawns for a rook.

== ECO codes ==
The Encyclopaedia of Chess Openings classifies the Najdorf Sicilian under codes B90 to B99 according to the below scheme.

- B90: 1.e4 c5 2.Nf3 d6 3.d4 cxd4 4.Nxd4 Nf6 5.Nc3 a6
- B91: 1.e4 c5 2.Nf3 d6 3.d4 cxd4 4.Nxd4 Nf6 5.Nc3 a6 6.g3 (Zagreb Variation)
- B92: 1.e4 c5 2.Nf3 d6 3.d4 cxd4 4.Nxd4 Nf6 5.Nc3 a6 6.Be2 (Classical/Opočenský Variation)
- B93: 1.e4 c5 2.Nf3 d6 3.d4 cxd4 4.Nxd4 Nf6 5.Nc3 a6 6.f4 (Amsterdam Variation)
- B94: 1.e4 c5 2.Nf3 d6 3.d4 cxd4 4.Nxd4 Nf6 5.Nc3 a6 6.Bg5
- B95: 1.e4 c5 2.Nf3 d6 3.d4 cxd4 4.Nxd4 Nf6 5.Nc3 a6 6.Bg5 e6
- B96: 1.e4 c5 2.Nf3 d6 3.d4 cxd4 4.Nxd4 Nf6 5.Nc3 a6 6.Bg5 e6 7.f4
- B97: 1.e4 c5 2.Nf3 d6 3.d4 cxd4 4.Nxd4 Nf6 5.Nc3 a6 6.Bg5 e6 7.f4 Qb6
- B98: 1.e4 c5 2.Nf3 d6 3.d4 cxd4 4.Nxd4 Nf6 5.Nc3 a6 6.Bg5 e6 7.f4 Be7
- B99: 1.e4 c5 2.Nf3 d6 3.d4 cxd4 4.Nxd4 Nf6 5.Nc3 a6 6.Bg5 e6 7.f4 Be7 8.Qf3 Qc7 9.0-0-0 Nbd7

== See also ==
- List of chess openings
- List of chess openings named after people
