= Trapping the queen =

Tactical motif in chess

Trapping the queen is a rare tactical motif in chess where a queen, the most powerful piece, is en prise and cannot move to safety or be rescued by another piece. The tactic is similar to a mating net, with the only difference being that the queen is the target, rather than the king.

Trapping a queen almost always occurs when the queen is deep in enemy territory, has limited movement due to being surrounded by many pieces, or both. When a player's queen is successfully trapped, it usually results in their immediate resignation, as losing the queen without significant compensation is almost invariably fatal in high levels of play.

== Examples ==
Position: a8 black rook, c8 black bishop, d8 black queen, e8 black rook, g8 black king, b7 black pawn, d7 black knight, e7 black bishop, g7 black pawn, h7 black pawn, a6 black pawn, c6 black pawn, d5 black pawn, f5 black pawn, d4 white pawn, e4 black knight, f4 white bishop, c3 white knight, d3 white bishop, e3 white pawn, f3 white knight, a2 white pawn, b2 white pawn, c2 white queen, f2 white pawn, g2 white pawn, h2 white pawn, c1 white rook, f1 white rook, g1 white king

The diagram on the right shows a position from the game Alekhine-Rubinstein, San Remo 1930. White plays for trapping the queen, as after the moves (1.Nxd5! cxd5?? 2.Bc7!), Black's queen is lost. In the game, Black did not take the knight and after the sequence (1. Nxd5 Bd6 2.Bxd6 Nxd6 3.Nf4), simply lost a pawn without compensation.

Position: a8 black rook, e8 black king, h8 black rook, a7 black pawn, b7 black pawn, d7 black bishop, e7 black pawn, f7 black pawn, g7 black bishop, h7 black pawn, c6 black knight, d6 black pawn, f6 black pawn, a5 black queen, b5 white bishop, h5 white queen, a4 white knight, d4 white knight, e4 white pawn, f4 white pawn, c3 white pawn, g3 white pawn, a2 white pawn, b2 white pawn, h2 white pawn, a1 white rook, g1 white king

A more complex position, shown in the second diagram originates from the game Liberman-Ioffe, URS, 1961. After the move 1.Ne6 Bf8 (forced, since 1...Bxe6 loses the queen to 2.Bxc6+ bxc6 3.Qxa5). After the moves (1.Ne6 Bf8 2.b4 Nxb4 (forced, otherwise the queen is trapped) 3.Bxd7+Kxd7 4.Qxa5 (and the Black queen is lost anyway)

Position: a8 black rook, c8 black bishop, e8 black king, h8 black rook, b7 black pawn, e7 black knight, f7 black pawn, g7 black pawn, h7 black pawn, a6 black pawn, e6 black pawn, d5 black pawn, e5 white pawn, d4 white knight, f4 white pawn, a3 white knight, c3 black queen, d3 white bishop, a2 white pawn, d2 white queen, g2 white pawn, h2 white pawn, a1 white rook, c1 white bishop, e1 white king, h1 white rook

The position shown in the third diagram on the right originates from the game Nezhmetdinov-Konstantinov, Rostov, 1936, after the moves (1.e4 e6 2.d4 d5 3.e5 c5 4.dxc5 Bxc5 5.Bd3 Nc6 6.Qe2 Qc7 7.Nf3 Nd4 8.Nxd4 Bxd4 9.f4 Ne7 10.Na3 a6 11.c3 Bxc3+ 12.bxc3 Qxc3+ 13.Qd2). When one of the strongest tactical geniuses of all time, Rashid Nezhmetdinov leaves a rook hanging, it may be advisable to proceed with caution. However, in the game Black took the rook (13...Qxa1??) and after 14.Bb1! he resigned, since the Black queen is trapped and will be lost after 15.Bb2.
