= Sicilian Defence, Scheveningen Variation =

Scheveningen Variation
Position: a8 black rook, b8 black knight, c8 black bishop, d8 black queen, e8 black king, f8 black bishop, h8 black rook, a7 black pawn, b7 black pawn, f7 black pawn, g7 black pawn, h7 black pawn, d6 black pawn, e6 black pawn, f6 black knight, d4 white knight, e4 white pawn, c3 white knight, a2 white pawn, b2 white pawn, c2 white pawn, f2 white pawn, g2 white pawn, h2 white pawn, a1 white rook, c1 white bishop, d1 white queen, e1 white king, f1 white bishop, h1 white rook
- Moves: 1.e4 c5 2.Nf3 d6 3.d4 cxd4 4.Nxd4 Nf6 5.Nc3 e6
- ECO: B80–B89
- Named after: Scheveningen
- Parent: Open Sicilian

The Scheveningen Variation is a variation of the Sicilian Defence. There are numerous move orders that reach the Scheveningen; a common one is:

1. e4 c5
2. Nf3 d6
3. d4 cxd4
4. Nxd4 Nf6
5. Nc3 e6

The opening is a line of the Open Sicilian characterised by Black setting up a "small centre" with pawns on d6 and e6. The seemingly modest pawn centre affords Black a solid defensive barrier, control of the critical d5 and e5 squares, and retains flexibility to break in the centre with a later ...e5 or ...d5. Black can proceed with rapid development, and the opening provides sound chances for Black and considerable scope for creativity.

The line became popular in the 1920s. It has been advocated by many distinguished grandmasters, such as Garry Kasparov.

== Origin ==
The variation first came to international attention during the 1923 chess tournament in the village Scheveningen at the North Sea coast near The Hague. During the tournament the variation was played several times by several players, including Max Euwe playing it against Géza Maróczy.

== Keres Attack: 6.g4 ==
Position: a8 black rook, c8 black bishop, d8 black queen, e8 black king, f8 black bishop, h8 black rook, a7 black pawn, b7 black pawn, f7 black pawn, g7 black pawn, c6 black knight, d6 black pawn, e6 black pawn, f6 black knight, h6 black pawn, d4 white knight, e4 white pawn, g4 white pawn, h4 white pawn, c3 white knight, a2 white pawn, b2 white pawn, c2 white pawn, f2 white pawn, a1 white rook, c1 white bishop, d1 white queen, e1 white king, f1 white bishop, g1 white rook

Keres Attack after 8.Rg1

White has several different attacking schemes available, but the one considered most dangerous is the Keres Attack, named after GM Paul Keres, which continues 6.g4. This move takes advantage of the fact that 5...e6 cuts off the black’s light squared bishop's control of g4, and plans to force the knight on f6, Black's only developed piece, to retreat. This also launches White into a kingside attack. Black usually continues with 6...h6 to stop White's expansion. Previously moves like 6...Nc6 or 6...a6 were also recommended for Black but practical tests have shown that White's offensive is too dangerous to be ignored. 7.h4 is strongest and the most popular. 7.g5 hxg5 8.Bxg5 Nc6 9.Qd2 Qb6 10.Nb3 a6 11.0-0-0 Bd7 12.h4 gives White an equal game at best. 7...Nc6 8.Rg1 (diagram) and here Black has two main lines to choose from:

- 8...d5 9.Bb5 Bd7 10.exd5 Nxd5 11.Nxd5 exd5 12.Qe2+ Be7 13.Nf5 Bxf5 14.gxf5 Kf8 15.Be3 Qa5+
- 8...h5 9.gxh5 Nxh5 10.Bg5 Nf6 11.Qd2

both of which may give White a slight edge.

== Classical Variation: 6.Be2 ==
Position: a8 black rook, c8 black bishop, e8 black rook, g8 black king, b7 black pawn, c7 black queen, e7 black bishop, f7 black pawn, g7 black pawn, h7 black pawn, a6 black pawn, c6 black knight, d6 black pawn, e6 black pawn, f6 black knight, a4 white pawn, d4 white knight, e4 white pawn, f4 white pawn, c3 white knight, e3 white bishop, f3 white bishop, b2 white pawn, c2 white pawn, g2 white pawn, h2 white pawn, a1 white rook, d1 white queen, f1 white rook, h1 white king

Classical Variation after 12.Bf3

Another very popular line is the Classical Variation (also known as Maroczy Variation, not to be confused with the Maroczy Bind) which is initiated by 6.Be2. Used to great effect by Anatoly Karpov, among other distinguished grandmasters, this methodical approach has gained many followers. The main line continues 6...a6 7.0-0 Be7 8.Be3 0-0 9.f4 Qc7 10.a4 Nc6 11.Kh1 Re8 12.Bf3 (diagram) reaching one of the main tabiyas of the Classical Scheveningen. White's plans here are to build up a kingside attack, typically by means of g2–g4–g5, Qd1–e1–h4, Bg2, Qh5, Rf3–h3, etc. Black will aim for a diversion on the queenside via the semi-open c-file, or strike in the centre. Positional pawn sacrifices abound for both sides and the theory is very highly developed, thanks to decades of research by the most elite players such as Garry Kasparov, Vasily Smyslov, Anatoly Karpov, Viswanathan Anand, Veselin Topalov, Boris Gelfand and many others.

== English Attack: 6.Be3 ==
Position: a8 black rook, d8 black queen, e8 black king, f8 black bishop, h8 black rook, b7 black bishop, d7 black knight, f7 black pawn, g7 black pawn, a6 black pawn, d6 black pawn, e6 black pawn, f6 black knight, h6 black pawn, b5 black pawn, d4 white knight, e4 white pawn, g4 white pawn, c3 white knight, e3 white bishop, f3 white pawn, a2 white pawn, b2 white pawn, c2 white pawn, d2 white queen, h2 white pawn, c1 white king, d1 white rook, f1 white bishop, h1 white rook

English Attack after 10.0-0-0 Bb7

The combative English Attack is modeled after the Yugoslav (Rauzer) Attack in the Sicilian Dragon. White starts an aggressive pawn storm on the kingside with f2–f3, g2–g4, h2–h4, and often g4–g5. White castles long and a very sharp game is often the result. Black, however, does not have to acquiesce to passive defence and has at least as many attacking threats. The main line continues 6.Be3 a6 7.f3 b5 8.g4 h6 9.Qd2 Nbd7 10.0-0-0 Bb7 (diagram). White's plans are to force g4–g5 and open the kingside files to his advantage. The first player may also exert considerable pressure on the d-file. Black will often consider an exchange sacrifice or at least a pawn sacrifice to open the queenside files for the heavy pieces. Time is of the essence and new ideas are discovered each year. Many elite players including Alexander Morozevich, Peter Leko, and Alexei Shirov have poured many hours of study into this critical variation.

== Other variations ==
=== Fischer–Sozin Attack: 6.Bc4 ===
Position: a8 black rook, b8 black knight, c8 black bishop, d8 black queen, e8 black king, f8 black bishop, h8 black rook, a7 black pawn, b7 black pawn, f7 black pawn, g7 black pawn, h7 black pawn, d6 black pawn, e6 black pawn, f6 black knight, c4 white bishop, d4 white knight, e4 white pawn, c3 white knight, a2 white pawn, b2 white pawn, c2 white pawn, f2 white pawn, g2 white pawn, h2 white pawn, a1 white rook, c1 white bishop, d1 white queen, e1 white king, h1 white rook

Fischer–Sozin Attack: 6.Bc4

With the Fischer–Sozin Attack 6.Bc4, White tries to pressure the d5-square directly. Viable Black responses in the centre include variations of Nb8–c6–a5 or Nb8–d7–c5, supplemented by a7–a6 and b7–b5–b4 on the queenside. A possible line is 6...Be7 7.Bb3 0-0 8.Be3 Na6 (aiming for the c5-square; note that in case 8...Nbd7, then 9.Bxe6!? fxe6 10.Nxe6 Qa5 11.Nxf8 Bxf8, and White sacrifices two pieces for a rook) 9.Qe2 Nc5 10.f3. The ensuing position is balanced, with Black ready to counter White's g2–g4–g5 with a7–a6 and b7–b5–b4 on the other flank.

=== Tal Variation: 6.f4 ===
After 6.f4, in one of the main lines, 6...Nc6 7.Be3 Be7 8.Qf3, White seeks to castle queenside placing his rook on the half-open d-file, and support the g-pawn's advance with the queen.

=== Minor lines ===
6.g3; 6.Bb5, etc. These moves are less difficult to meet and are not theoretically challenging to Black.

== Question of move orders and the Najdorf Variation ==
The Keres Attack puts Black into a rather defensive and potentially dangerous position. For this reason, many advocates of this defense tend to play the Najdorf Variation move order and then play 6...e6, transposing into the Scheveningen. The most prominent example of such a preference for the Najdorf move order was seen in World Chess Championship 1984, where after game one when Kasparov had difficulties in the opening, he never allowed the Keres Attack and finally switched to the Najdorf move order. The Najdorf move order, while eliminating 6.g4, allows White additional options such as 6.Bg5, and g4 is still a possible move after. Basically, the Najdorf move order delays g4 by one move making the attack vastly less powerful, and meanwhile the Scheveningen move order speeds up kingside development making 6.Bg5 much less powerful. As the Keres Attack is feared more than 6.Bg5, the Najdorf move order is seen more at the highest level today. Because Najdorf's original intention was to play ...e5 all in one go and the history of the move order, openings beginning with 5...a6 are often put in the Scheveningen category if ...e6 is played immediately after.

Much modern analysis of the Scheveningen is under the rubric of the Najdorf. In fact, many books exploring the Scheveningen today have Najdorf in the title. This, continuing the line of thinking in the English section above, is technically the Najdorf Variation of the Sicilian Defense with the very popular English Attack. Note that the "Modern" Scheveningen only covers lines without an early ...a6 from Black. The "Classical" Scheveningen includes the early ...a6. This distinction is important in choosing books to study, as titles covering recent games will often leave out the ...a6 early line, which can still become quite interesting and complex, and still advantageous for Black, even with the powerful English Attack. Many modern chess software programs, such as HIARCS, still play ...a6 early on, despite the fact that "modern" often precludes the line in definitive analysis, depending on the book. Vlastimil Jansa has advocated this variation.

== See also ==
- List of chess openings
- List of chess openings named after places
