= Italian Game =

Chess opening

Position: a8 black rook, c8 black bishop, d8 black queen, e8 black king, f8 black bishop, g8 black knight, h8 black rook, a7 black pawn, b7 black pawn, c7 black pawn, d7 black pawn, f7 black pawn, g7 black pawn, h7 black pawn, c6 black knight, e5 black pawn, c4 white bishop, e4 white pawn, f3 white knight, a2 white pawn, b2 white pawn, c2 white pawn, d2 white pawn, f2 white pawn, g2 white pawn, h2 white pawn, a1 white rook, b1 white knight, c1 white bishop, d1 white queen, e1 white king, h1 white rook
- Moves: 1.e4 e5 2.Nf3 Nc6 3.Bc4
- ECO: C50–C59
- Origin: 15th or 16th century
- Parent: King's Knight Opening
- Synonym: Italian Opening

The Italian Game is a chess opening beginning with the moves:

1. e4 e5
2. Nf3 Nc6
3. Bc4

White develops the bishop to the active square c4 (the so-called "Italian bishop"), where it attacks Black's pawn on f7, protected only by the king. Black usually responds with 3...Bc5 (the Giuoco Piano) or 3...Nf6 (the Two Knights Defense).

One of the oldest recorded chess openings, the Italian Game was developed in the 16th century by players such as Pedro Damiano and Giulio Polerio. It featured prominently in the game collections of Gioachino Greco, dating to between 1620 and 1625. It has been extensively analyzed and is frequently taught to beginners.

== Terminology ==
The term Italian Game was not commonly used in English until the late 20th century. Originally, it was synonymous with the more common term Giuoco Piano. "Giuoco Piano", traditionally translated as "quiet game", originally referred to non-gambit openings and reflected a general philosophy among early Italian writers such as Alessandro Salvio and the later Modenese school of preferring rapid development to premature sacrifices. Their works included a lot of analysis of 1.e4 e5 2.Nf3 Nc6 3.Bc4 Bc5 albeit with different castling rules, and in the early 19th century the name "Giuoco Piano" was attached to this specific opening by early English chess writers such as George Walker and William Lewis. Black's main third-move alternative 3...Nf6 (the Two Knights Defense) has usually been treated as a separate opening. For about the next 150 years opening manuals such as Reuben Fine's Practical Chess Openings (1948) did not use the term "Italian Game" or include a name for 3.Bc4 in general.

The name "Italian Game" was advocated in preference to "Giuoco Piano" by Tim Harding and George Botterill in their 1977 book, on the grounds that the name "Giuoco Piano" did not reflect the sharp tactics present in many lines. Subsequently the name "Italian Game" saw an increase in usage as the slower Ruy Lopez-style variations with c2–c3 and d2–d3 became popular during the 1980s.

Gradually a convention emerged of treating all lines stemming from 3.Bc4 under the umbrella term "Italian Game". Dutch Grandmaster Paul van der Sterren wrote in Fundamental Chess Openings (2009):

For centuries, 3.Bc4 was so self-evident a move that it was not thought necessary to give it a name, like 1.e4 also has no name. Names were only given after 3.Bc4, in order to distinguish between Black's major replies. 3...Bc5 was called the Giuoco Piano and 3...Nf6 the Two Knights Defence. The mere fact that in this book I follow the modern trend by lumping them together and calling 3.Bc4 the Italian Game, is sadly illustrative of the diminished importance of this opening.

A few authors have adopted differing definitions of Giuoco Piano, such as including all 3.Bc4 lines, including only lines with 4.c3, or including only lines with 4.c3 Nf6 5.d4. The term "Giuoco Pianissimo" is sometimes used to describe lines in which White plays d2–d3, especially the line 4.d3 Nf6 5.Nc3; depending on the author, this term may also include the above-mentioned d2–d3 and c2–c3 lines.

Other terms used to describe these lines include Slow Italian for lines with d2–d3 and Classical Italian for lines with d2–d4.

== History ==
The Italian Game has a very long history of play. It is one of the openings analyzed in the Göttingen manuscript, the earliest known work on modern chess. According to recorded games from around 1620, Gioachino Greco met 3...Nf6 with 4.Ng5 and 3...Bc5 with 4.c3; consistently playing 4.c3 while other players tended to play 4.0-0. He developed the old main line 4.c3 Nf6 5.d4 exd4 6.cxd4 Bb4+, and particularly the sharp variation 7.Nc3, which is still occasionally seen today.

The early 19th century saw the introduction of the Evans Gambit (4.b4), which was played several times by both players in the La Bourdonnais-McDonnell matches of 1834 and by many of the leading masters of the 19th century.

In the 1880s, Henry Bird had already written that 3.Bc4 was "not quite so much in favor with the leading players as it formerly was", and in the 20th century the Ruy Lopez (3.Bb5) overtook it in popularity, though a few masters such as Rudolf Spielmann continued to employ it regularly. Paul Keres wrote that the move 3.Bc4 was "too calm to give White advantage".

In the late 20th century, the opening's popularity recovered somewhat as the Giuoco Pianissimo (the lines where White plays 4.d3 or 5.d3) became more played, especially by younger players, as well as by Anatoly Karpov, who played it twice in the World Chess Championship 1981. The recovery continued in the 21st century due to the emergence of the Berlin Defense (3.Bb5 Nf6) to the Ruy Lopez after the Classical World Chess Championship 2000 between Vladimir Kramnik and Garry Kasparov, which led White players to search for new ideas in the Italian, which avoids the Berlin.

== Giuoco Piano: 3...Bc5 ==
Position: a8 black rook, c8 black bishop, d8 black queen, e8 black king, g8 black knight, h8 black rook, a7 black pawn, b7 black pawn, c7 black pawn, d7 black pawn, f7 black pawn, g7 black pawn, h7 black pawn, c6 black knight, c5 black bishop, e5 black pawn, c4 white bishop, e4 white pawn, f3 white knight, a2 white pawn, b2 white pawn, c2 white pawn, d2 white pawn, f2 white pawn, g2 white pawn, h2 white pawn, a1 white rook, b1 white knight, c1 white bishop, d1 white queen, e1 white king, h1 white rook

Giuoco Piano: 3...Bc5

3...Bc5 is the Giuoco Piano, conventionally translated as "Quiet Game" although it is not always quiet. The name was originally applied to non-gambit openings in general.

The main move for White is 4.c3, which was mentioned by Pedro Damiano in his 1512 book. After 4...Nf6, Greco's move 5.d4 was the main line for centuries. Alternatively, White may play an early d2–d3, the Giuoco Pianissimo ("Very Quiet Game"), a more positional line in which White delays or forgoes playing d4. After 4.d3, White also has the option of 5.Nc3, a line which may also be reached via 4.Nc3 Nf6 5.d3.

Alternative continuations for White include the aggressive Evans Gambit (4.b4), a popular opening in the 19th century which is still occasionally played. 4.0-0 will usually transpose into the Giuoco Pianissimo after 4...Nf6 5.d3, or White can play a gambit with 5.d4. The Italian Gambit (4.d4) may transpose into the Scotch Gambit after 4...exd4; however, Black's best reply is 4...Bxd4!, so if White wants a Scotch Gambit, 3.d4 is usually preferred. The Jerome Gambit (4.Bxf7+) is unsound.

=== Classical Variation: 4.c3 Nf6 5.d4 exd4 ===
Classical Italian

Position: a8 black rook, c8 black bishop, d8 black queen, e8 black king, h8 black rook, a7 black pawn, b7 black pawn, c7 black pawn, d7 black pawn, f7 black pawn, g7 black pawn, h7 black pawn, c6 black knight, f6 black knight, c5 black bishop, e5 black pawn, c4 white bishop, d4 white pawn, e4 white pawn, c3 white pawn, f3 white knight, a2 white pawn, b2 white pawn, f2 white pawn, g2 white pawn, h2 white pawn, a1 white rook, b1 white knight, c1 white bishop, d1 white queen, e1 white king, h1 white rook

After 4.c3 Nf6 5.d4

Position: a8 black rook, c8 black bishop, d8 black queen, e8 black king, h8 black rook, a7 black pawn, b7 black pawn, c7 black pawn, d7 black pawn, f7 black pawn, g7 black pawn, h7 black pawn, c6 black knight, f6 black knight, b4 black bishop, c4 white bishop, d4 white pawn, e4 white pawn, f3 white knight, a2 white pawn, b2 white pawn, f2 white pawn, g2 white pawn, h2 white pawn, a1 white rook, b1 white knight, c1 white bishop, d1 white queen, e1 white king, h1 white rook

After 5...exd4 6.cxd4 Bb4+

Position: a8 black rook, c8 black bishop, d8 black queen, e8 black king, h8 black rook, a7 black pawn, b7 black pawn, c7 black pawn, f7 black pawn, g7 black pawn, h7 black pawn, c6 black knight, f6 black knight, c5 black bishop, d5 black pawn, e5 white pawn, c4 white bishop, d4 black pawn, c3 white pawn, f3 white knight, a2 white pawn, b2 white pawn, f2 white pawn, g2 white pawn, h2 white pawn, a1 white rook, b1 white knight, c1 white bishop, d1 white queen, e1 white king, h1 white rook

After 5...exd4 6.e5 d5

For centuries, the central strike 5.d4 was the dominant move. The line remained common into the 20th century, being played by Wilhelm Steinitz in the World Chess Championship 1894 and World Chess Championship 1896-1897, and experiencing a burst of popularity after the discovery of the Møller Attack around the turn of the century, however the Møller Attack is now considered refuted.

After 5...exd4 6.cxd4, 6...Bb4+ is Black's only good reply. White's responses include 7.Nc3, gambiting a pawn and possibly leading to the Møller Attack, and 7.Bd2. In the 21st century, 7.Nbd2 emerged as a viable alternative, while the Kraków Chess Club's early 20th century experiment 7.Kf1 has been largely abandoned.

In the 21st century, 5.d4 exd4 6.e5, a line popularized by Evgeny Sveshnikov, saw an upsurge in popularity. 6...d5! is Black's only good reply, typically continuing 7.Bb5 Ne4 8.cxd4 Bb6. 8...Bb4+, frequently played by Adolf Anderssen, and 7.Be2, advocated by Baadur Jobava, are also possible. Also occasionally seen are the gambit lines 6.b4, sometimes called the Dubov Italian, and 6.0-0.

=== Modern Variation: 4.c3 Nf6 5.d3 ===
Modern Italian

Position: a8 black rook, c8 black bishop, d8 black queen, e8 black king, h8 black rook, a7 black pawn, b7 black pawn, c7 black pawn, d7 black pawn, f7 black pawn, g7 black pawn, h7 black pawn, c6 black knight, f6 black knight, c5 black bishop, e5 black pawn, c4 white bishop, e4 white pawn, c3 white pawn, d3 white pawn, f3 white knight, a2 white pawn, b2 white pawn, f2 white pawn, g2 white pawn, h2 white pawn, a1 white rook, b1 white knight, c1 white bishop, d1 white queen, e1 white king, h1 white rook

After 4.c3 Nf6 5.d3

Position: a8 black rook, c8 black bishop, d8 black queen, e8 black king, h8 black rook, b7 black pawn, c7 black pawn, f7 black pawn, g7 black pawn, h7 black pawn, a6 black pawn, c6 black knight, d6 black pawn, f6 black knight, c5 black bishop, e5 black pawn, c4 white bishop, e4 white pawn, c3 white pawn, d3 white pawn, f3 white knight, a2 white pawn, b2 white pawn, f2 white pawn, g2 white pawn, h2 white pawn, a1 white rook, b1 white knight, c1 white bishop, d1 white queen, f1 white rook, g1 white king

After 5...d6 6.0-0 a6

Position: a8 black rook, c8 black bishop, d8 black queen, f8 black rook, g8 black king, a7 black pawn, b7 black pawn, c7 black pawn, f7 black pawn, g7 black pawn, h7 black pawn, c6 black knight, f6 black knight, c5 black bishop, d5 black pawn, e5 black pawn, c4 white bishop, e4 white pawn, c3 white pawn, d3 white pawn, f3 white knight, a2 white pawn, b2 white pawn, f2 white pawn, g2 white pawn, h2 white pawn, a1 white rook, b1 white knight, c1 white bishop, d1 white queen, f1 white rook, g1 white king

After 5...0-0 6.0-0 d5

White playing both 4.c3 and 5.d3 comprises the modern main line of the Italian, which appeared in many top-level games in the 21st century. A more positional alternative to the old main line, White has many move orders and possible plans which reduces the value of computer-assisted preparation when compared to more tactical lines like those following 5.d4. It is also frequently reached via 4.d3 Nf6 5.c3 or from the Two Knights Defense via 3...Nf6 4.d3 Bc5 5.c3.

Black most often plays d7-d6, typically planning ...a6 or ...a5. A frequent alternative is for Black to castle, preparing d7-d5, opening the game.

=== Black's fourth-move alternatives ===
Black has several more passive alternatives to 4...Nf6:

- 4...d6
- 4...Qe7
- 4...Bb6 (typically transposing to the 4...d6 or 4...Qe7 line)

=== Four Knights Variation: 4.Nc3 Nf6 5.d3 ===
Position: a8 black rook, c8 black bishop, d8 black queen, e8 black king, h8 black rook, a7 black pawn, b7 black pawn, c7 black pawn, d7 black pawn, f7 black pawn, g7 black pawn, h7 black pawn, c6 black knight, f6 black knight, c5 black bishop, e5 black pawn, c4 white bishop, e4 white pawn, c3 white knight, d3 white pawn, f3 white knight, a2 white pawn, b2 white pawn, c2 white pawn, f2 white pawn, g2 white pawn, h2 white pawn, a1 white rook, c1 white bishop, d1 white queen, e1 white king, h1 white rook

After 4.Nc3 Nf6 5.d3

4.Nc3 is usually met with 4...Nf6, after which play tends to continue 5.d3 d6, a perfectly symmetrical position. It is also often reached via 4.d3 Nf6 5.Nc3 or 3...Nf6 4.d3 Bc5 5.Nc3. The line can be considered to transpose to the Four Knights Game (3.Nc3 Nf6), but because 4.Bc4 can be met with 4...Nxe4 in that move order, it is more reliably reached via 3.Bc4.

=== Evans Gambit: 4.b4 ===
Position: a8 black rook, c8 black bishop, d8 black queen, e8 black king, g8 black knight, h8 black rook, a7 black pawn, b7 black pawn, c7 black pawn, d7 black pawn, f7 black pawn, g7 black pawn, h7 black pawn, c6 black knight, c5 black bishop, e5 black pawn, b4 white pawn, c4 white bishop, e4 white pawn, f3 white knight, a2 white pawn, c2 white pawn, d2 white pawn, f2 white pawn, g2 white pawn, h2 white pawn, a1 white rook, b1 white knight, c1 white bishop, d1 white queen, e1 white king, h1 white rook

Evans Gambit: 4.b4

In the Evans Gambit (4.b4), White sacrifices a pawn for quick development and attacking chances. The main line continues 4...Bxb4 5.c3 Ba5 (5...Be7 is a sound alternative) 6.d4, and now Black's main options are 6...d6 and 6...exd4. After achieving widespread popularity in the 1830s, the gambit remained very popular until the end of the era of Romantic chess. Perhaps the most famous game in the Evans Gambit is the Evergreen Game, which Adolf Anderssen won against Jean Dufresne, probably played in Berlin in 1852.

=== Italian Gambit: 4.d4 ===
Position: a8 black rook, c8 black bishop, d8 black queen, e8 black king, g8 black knight, h8 black rook, a7 black pawn, b7 black pawn, c7 black pawn, d7 black pawn, f7 black pawn, g7 black pawn, h7 black pawn, c6 black knight, c5 black bishop, e5 black pawn, c4 white bishop, d4 white pawn, e4 white pawn, f3 white knight, a2 white pawn, b2 white pawn, c2 white pawn, f2 white pawn, g2 white pawn, h2 white pawn, a1 white rook, b1 white knight, c1 white bishop, d1 white queen, e1 white king, h1 white rook

Italian Gambit: 4.d4

4.d4 is the Italian Gambit or Rosentreter Gambit. 4...exd4 transposes into the Scotch Gambit. 4...Nxd4 is well met by 5.Nxe5. 4...Bxd4 is generally considered the best reply.

=== 4.0-0 Nf6 5.d4 ===
Position: a8 black rook, c8 black bishop, d8 black queen, e8 black king, h8 black rook, a7 black pawn, b7 black pawn, c7 black pawn, d7 black pawn, f7 black pawn, g7 black pawn, h7 black pawn, c6 black knight, f6 black knight, c5 black bishop, e5 black pawn, c4 white bishop, d4 white pawn, e4 white pawn, f3 white knight, a2 white pawn, b2 white pawn, c2 white pawn, f2 white pawn, g2 white pawn, h2 white pawn, a1 white rook, b1 white knight, c1 white bishop, d1 white queen, f1 white rook, g1 white king

4.0-0 Nf6 5.d4

The line 4.0-0 Nf6 5.d4 has no standard name, though it has been called the Max Lange Gambit and the Deutz Gambit. Black can reply 5...exd4, which allows White to play the Max Lange Attack (6.e5). Instead, the most common continuation is 5...Bxd4 6.Nxd4 Nxd4, followed by 7.f4 or 7.Bg5.

== Two Knights Defense: 3...Nf6 ==
Position: a8 black rook, c8 black bishop, d8 black queen, e8 black king, f8 black bishop, h8 black rook, a7 black pawn, b7 black pawn, c7 black pawn, d7 black pawn, f7 black pawn, g7 black pawn, h7 black pawn, c6 black knight, f6 black knight, e5 black pawn, c4 white bishop, e4 white pawn, f3 white knight, a2 white pawn, b2 white pawn, c2 white pawn, d2 white pawn, f2 white pawn, g2 white pawn, h2 white pawn, a1 white rook, b1 white knight, c1 white bishop, d1 white queen, e1 white king, h1 white rook

Two Knights Defense: 3...Nf6

3...Nf6, the Two Knights Defense is a more aggressive option for Black. David Bronstein even went so far as to propose that "Chigorin Counterattack" would be a more appropriate name. White's three common replies are 4.Ng5, 4.d4, and 4.d3.

=== 4.Ng5 ===
If White attempts to exploit the weakness of Black's f-pawn with 4.Ng5, Black may try the knife-edged Traxler Counterattack (4...Bc5!?). After the more common 4...d5 5.exd5, Black generally avoids 5...Nxd5 allowing 6.Nxf7, the Fegatello or Fried Liver Attack, or 6.d4, the Lolli Variation, both of which are difficult to defend under practical conditions. Most common is 5...Na5, sacrificing a pawn for an active position. The very sharp Fritz Variation (5...Nd4) and the closely related Ulvestad Variation (5...b5) lead to wild positions with little margin for error for either side.

=== 4.d4 ===
4.d4, which can be considered to transpose to Scotch Gambit after the usual reply 4...exd4, has the classical sacrificial continuation 5.0-0. Black's best move is to accept the offered pawn with 5...Nxe4. The main alternative is 5...Bc5, which allows the Max Lange Attack (6.e5). The modern main continuation is instead 5.e5, which can be met with 5...d5, 5...Ne4, or 5...Ng4.

=== 4.d3 ===
A quieter option for White is 4.d3, when Black's main options are 4...Bc5, transposing into the Giuoco Pianissimo; 4...Be7, a solid move; 4...h6, which may intend a kingside attack with ...g5; and the risky 4...d5.

== Other replies to 3.Bc4 ==
- 3...Be7 (Hungarian Defense). A solid, drawish defense which is occasionally seen in tournament play to avoid the complexities and risks of the other lines.
- 3...d6 (Semi-Italian Opening). Another solid positional line, popular in the late 19th and early 20th centuries, but rarely seen today. Transposition to the Hungarian Defense (e.g. after 4.0-0 Be7) or Scotch Game (after 4.d4 exd4) is common. The main independent lines begin 4.d4 Bg4 and 4.c3. 4.c3 f5 is a delayed Rousseau Gambit.
- 3...g6. This allows White to attack with 4.d4 (4.d3 has also been tried) 4...exd4 5.c3! (5.Nxd4 and 5.Bg5 are also possible) 5...dxc3 6.Nxc3 Bg7 and now 7.Qb3 (Unzicker) or 7.Bg5 (O'Kelly).
- 3...Nd4 (Blackburne Shilling Gambit). This ostensibly weak third move is a false gambit expectant upon White falling into the trap of capturing Black's undefended pawn (4.Nxe5?! Qg5). While generally considered time-wasting against more experienced players due to 4.Nxd4! exd4 5.c3, it has ensnared many chess novices and can provide a quick and easy mate against players unfamiliar with the line.
- 3...f5 (Rousseau Gambit). White does best to avoid the pawn offer with 4.d3 or 4.d4.
- 3...Qf6. After 3...Qf6?! 4.Nc3 Nge7 5.Nb5 White has a clear advantage (Unzicker).
- 3...h6. Neglects Black's development and is generally considered a waste of time; however, the move has no immediate refutation and has been tried by Czech grandmaster Pavel Blatny.

== See also ==
- Encyclopaedia of Chess Openings
- List of chess openings
- List of chess openings named after places
