= Scotch Game =

Chess opening

Position: a8 black rook, c8 black bishop, d8 black queen, e8 black king, f8 black bishop, g8 black knight, h8 black rook, a7 black pawn, b7 black pawn, c7 black pawn, d7 black pawn, f7 black pawn, g7 black pawn, h7 black pawn, c6 black knight, e5 black pawn, d4 white pawn, e4 white pawn, f3 white knight, a2 white pawn, b2 white pawn, c2 white pawn, f2 white pawn, g2 white pawn, h2 white pawn, a1 white rook, b1 white knight, c1 white bishop, d1 white queen, e1 white king, f1 white bishop, h1 white rook
- Moves: 1.e4 e5 2.Nf3 Nc6 3.d4
- ECO: C44–C45
- Origin: 1750
- Named after: Scotland
- Parent: King's Knight Opening
- Synonym: Scotch Opening

The Scotch Game, or Scotch Opening, is a chess opening that begins with the moves:

1. e4 e5
2. Nf3 Nc6
3. d4

White strikes in the centre early with 3.d4. Black almost always responds with 3...exd4. White's most common reply is 4.Nxd4, with the notable alternatives 4.Bc4 (the Scotch Gambit) and 4.c3 (the Göring Gambit).

Ercole del Rio, in his 1750 treatise Sopra il giuoco degli Scacchi, Osservazioni pratiche d’anonimo Autore Modenese ("On the game of Chess, practical Observations by an anonymous Modenese Author"), was the first author to mention what is now called the Scotch Game. The opening received its name from a correspondence match in 1824 between Edinburgh and London.

Common in the 19th century, by 1900 the Scotch had declined in popularity because it was thought to release the central tension too early and allow Black to equalise without difficulty. Garry Kasparov led a revival of the Scotch in the late 20th century, however, arguing it caused Black lasting strategic problems while avoiding the extensively analysed Ruy Lopez. It has also been advocated by Jan Timman and Sergei Rublevsky.

== Analysis ==
White aims to dominate the centre by exchanging the d-pawn for Black's e-pawn. Black usually plays 3...exd4, as there is no good way to maintain the pawn on e5. After the usual 3...exd4, the main line is 4.Nxd4. A common pattern is an exchange with Nxc6 bxc6, inflicting doubled pawns on Black. In the main line after 4.Nxd4, Black has two major options. 4...Bc5 and 4...Nf6 are best regarded, seen as offering Black good chances for an equal game.

Alternatively, White can play a gambit by offering Black one or two pawns in exchange for rapid development, either by playing 4.Bc4, the Scotch Gambit, or 4.c3, the Göring Gambit, which has similar themes to the Danish Gambit.

Examined in this article are the following common variations:

- 3...exd4 4.Nxd4 (main line)
  - 4...Bc5 (Classical Variation)
    - 5.Be3 Qf6 (traditional line)
      - 6.c3 Nge7
        - 7.Bc4 (main line)
        - 7.g3 (fianchetto line)
        - 7.Nc2 (Meitner Variation)
        - 7.Qd2 (Blackburne Attack)
        - 7.Bb5 (Paulsen Attack)
      - 6.c3 Qg6 (Millennium Variation)
      - 6.Nb5 Bxe3 7.fxe3 (Blumenfeld Attack)
    - 5.Nxc6 Qf6 (Intermezzo Variation)
    - 5.Nb3 Bb6 (Potter Variation)
    - 5.Nb3 Bb4 (Romanishin Variation)
  - 4...Nf6 5.Nxc6 bxc6 (Schmidt Variation)
    - 6.e5 (Mieses Variation)
    - 6.Bd3 (traditional line)
    - 6.Nd2 (Tartakower Variation)
    - 6.Qe2 (modern line)
  - 4...Nf6 5.Nc3 (Four Knights Game, Scotch Variation, by transposition)
  - 4...Bb4 (Malaniuk Variation)
  - 4...Qf6
  - 4...Qh4 (Steinitz Variation)
    - 5.Nc3 Bb4 6.Be2 Qxe4 7.Nb5 Bxc3+ 8.bxc3 Kd8 9.0-0 (main line)
    - 5.Nb5 (Horwitz Attack)
  - 4...Nxd4 5.Qxd4 (Lolli Variation, by transposition)
- 3...exd4 4.Bc4 (Scotch Gambit)
  - 4...Nf6 (Two Knights Defense, Open Variation, by transposition)
  - 4...Bc5
    - 5.c3 Nf6 (Giuoco Piano, Classical Variation, by transposition)
    - 5.0-0 Nf6 6.e5 (Max Lange Attack)
    - 5.0-0 d6 6.c3 Bg4 (Cochrane-Anderssen Variation)
    - 5.Ng5 Nh6 6.Nxf7 Nxf7 7.Bxf7+ Kxf7 8.Qh5+ g6 9.Qxc5
  - 4...Bb4+ (London Defence)
  - 4...Be7 (Hungarian Defence, by transposition)
- 3...exd4 4.c3 (Göring Gambit)
  - 4...dxc3 5.Nxc3 (Göring Gambit Accepted, single pawn gambit)
    - 5...Bb4 6.Bc4 d6 7.0-0 Bxc3 8.bxc3 (main line)
    - 5...Bb4 6.Bc4 d6 7.Qb3 (old main line)
    - 5...Bb4 6.Bc4 Nf6 (Bardeleben Variation)
  - 4...dxc3 5.Bc4 (Göring Gambit Accepted, double pawn gambit)
    - 5...d6 6.Nxc3 Nf6 7.Qb3 Qd7 8.Ng5 Ne5 9.Bb5 c6 10.f4 (main line)
    - 5...d6 6.Nxc3 Be6 7.Bxe6 fxe6 8.Qb3 (exchange line)
    - 5...cxb2 6.Bxb2 (Göring Gambit Fully Accepted)
    - 5...Bb4 (Scotch Gambit, London Defence, by transposition)
  - 4...d5 5.exd5 Qxd5 6.cxd4 Bg4 7.Be2 (Göring Gambit Declined, main line)
  - 4...Nf6 (Ponziani Opening, by transposition)
- 3...exd4 4.Bb5 (Relfsson Gambit)
- 3...Nxd4 (Lolli Variation)
  - 4.Nxd4 exd4 5.Qxd4 (main line)
  - 4.Nxd4 exd4 5.Bc4 (Napoleon Gambit)
  - 4.Nxe5
- 3...d6

== Classical Variation: 4.Nxd4 Bc5 ==
Position: a8 black rook, c8 black bishop, d8 black queen, e8 black king, g8 black knight, h8 black rook, a7 black pawn, b7 black pawn, c7 black pawn, d7 black pawn, f7 black pawn, g7 black pawn, h7 black pawn, c6 black knight, c5 black bishop, d4 white knight, e4 white pawn, a2 white pawn, b2 white pawn, c2 white pawn, f2 white pawn, g2 white pawn, h2 white pawn, a1 white rook, b1 white knight, c1 white bishop, d1 white queen, e1 white king, f1 white bishop, h1 white rook

Classical Variation: 4.Nxd4 Bc5

This move puts additional pressure on White's central knight (initially defended only by the queen), which must be exchanged (with 5.Nxc6), reinforced (usually with 5.Be3), or moved (usually with 5.Nb3) to avoid a loss of material.

=== Traditional line: 5.Be3 Qf6 6.c3 Nge7 ===
5.Be3 reinforces the knight on d4, and threatens to win a piece with Nxc6 (attacking Black's queen and uncorking a discovered attack on Black's bishop). Black almost always responds 5...Qf6, adding a third attacker against d4. White's usual response 6.c3 adds a third defender. Play usually continues 6...Nge7. Several seventh-move alternatives for White are possible here, most notably 7.Bc4, as well as 7.g3 (intending a kingside fianchetto), 7.Nc2, 7.Be2, 7.Qd2, and 7.Bb5.

After 7.Bc4, which develops and aims to keep control over d5, 7...Ne5 seems Black's strongest reply. Play usually continues 8.Be2 (White allows Ne5 with tempo to enable a potential f4 counter) Qg6 (8...d5 is also possible) 9.0-0. Here, White allows Black the option of taking the unprotected pawn on e4, but it is considered "poisoned".) If 8.0-0 Bb6 and the position is roughly equal. Also common are 7...0-0 (often continuing 8.0-0 Bb6 and then 9.Na3 or 9.Nc2, among others) and 7...b6 (often continuing 8.0-0 Bb7 and then 9.Nb5, 9.f4, or 9.Nb3). It was claimed in an analysis by Alexey Sokolsky in the 1940s that 7...Ne5 followed by 8...Qg6 led to equality, and for this reason 7.Bc4 fell out of popularity until it was revived in the 1990s by Garry Kasparov, among others.

Black usually replies to 7.g3 with 7...d5, followed by 8.Bg2 dxe4 9.Nd2 Bxd4 10.cxd4 0-0 11.Nxe4 Qg6 12.0-0.

Alternative sixth moves for Black include 6...Qg6, the Millennium Variation, as well as 6...d6. White also has the option of 6.Nb5, the Blumenfeld Attack, which often continues 6...Bxe3 7.fxe3 Qh4+ 8.g3 Qxe4 9.Nxc7+ Kd8 10.Nxa8 Qxh1 (or 10...Nf6 11.Nc3 Qxh1), or Black may opt for 8...Qd8.

Alternative fifth moves for Black are uncommon but include 5...Bb6, 5...Nxd4, and 5...Bxd4. Black must avoid 5...Nf6?? as 6.Nxc6 followed by 7.Bxc5 wins the bishop. Also weak is 5...d6?, as 6.Nxc6 bxc6 7.Bxc5 dxc5 leaves Black with tripled pawns on the c-file.

=== Potter Variation: 5.Nb3 Bb6 ===
White simultaneously moves the knight to a safer square and threatens Black's bishop, which must be moved (unless Black wishes to give up the bishop pair with 5...Qe7 6.Nxc5 Qxc5). The usual response 5...Bb6 accomplishes this without impeding the development of Black's other pieces.

After 5...Bb6, White's most common response is 6.Nc3, usually intending Qe2, Be3 or Bg5, and 0-0-0. Black's most common replies are 6...Nf6, often continuing 7.Qe2 0-0 or 7.Bg5 h6 8.Bh4; 6...d6, often continuing 7.Qe2 Nge7 8.Be3 0-0 9.0-0-0 f5; 6...Qf6, commonly continuing 7.Qe2 Nge7 8.Be3 0-0 9.0-0-0 d6; and 6...Nge7, which typically continues similarly to the 6...d6 line.

Other options for White include 6.a4, which usually continues 6...a6 7.Nc3, with similar continuations to the lines with 6.Nc3, as well as the modern try 6.Qe2, which often ends up transposing to lines beginning with 6.Nc3 (such as after 6...d6 7.Be3 Qf6 8.Nc3), but also permits independent lines. For example, after 6...Nf6 7.e5 Nd5 8.c4 Ndb4 9.c5 Bxc5 10.Nxc5 Nd4 11.Qg4 Ndc2+, Black has given up a bishop in order to fork White's king and rook, while White seeks to counterattack with Qxg7.

The line is named after William Norwood Potter. It was revived in the 2000s with success by Vassily Ivanchuk and Magnus Carlsen.

=== Intermezzo Variation: 5.Nxc6 Qf6 ===
Although the immediate recapture 5...bxc6 (5...dxc6 permits 6.Qxd8+ Kxd8) is playable, Black almost always continues 5...Qf6, a zwischenzug (also known as an "in-between move" or "intermezzo", hence the name of the variation). White is not able to retreat the knight from the threat of recapture on c6 because of the threat of checkmate with 6...Qxf2, allowing Black to then recapture with 6...dxc6 (or 6...Qxc6, though this is rare) rather than 6...bxc6, preventing White from inflicting an isolated pawn on Black. 6.Qd2 and 6.Qf3 (offering an exchange of queens) are the most common methods for White to prevent the checkmate before Black recaptures; 6.Qe2 and 6.f4 are occasionally seen.

After 6.Qd2, play usually continues 6...dxc6 7.Nc3 (or 7.Bd3). Black commonly replies with 7...Be6, often continuing 8.Na4 Rd8 9.Bd3 Bd4 10.0-0; 7...Ne7, often continuing 8.Qf4; or 7...Bd4, often continuing 8.Bd3 Ne7 9.0-0 Ng6. After 6.Qf3, Black often recaptures with the b-pawn anyway, either immediately with 6...bxc6, or after 6...Qxf3 7.gxf3 bxc6, though 6...dxc6 is still common.

=== Other lines ===
- Another option for relocating the knight is 5.Nf5. The most common continuation is 5...d5 6.Nxg7+ Kf8 7.Nh5 Qh4 8.Ng3 Nf6 9.Be2, leaving Black with a large lead in development, but at the cost of losing castling rights and receiving isolated pawns. The pawn can be regained with 9...dxe4 or 9...Nxe4, or Black may elect to continue development instead, such as with 9...Rg8. Other common fifth moves for Black include 5...d6, which has a similar common continuation, and 5...Qf6 and 5...g6, which prevent 6.Nxg7+.
- White may also retreat the knight to its original square with 5.Nf3. This leaves Black with an advantage in development, as unlike in the Potter Variation, no tempo is won on Black's bishop.
- Reinforcing the knight with 5.c3 is weak. For example, after 5...Qh4, 6.Bd3 (protecting the pawn on e4) lets Black gain material via 6...Nxd4 7.cxd4 Bxd4, as the bishop blocks White's queen's protection of the knight.
- After 5.Nb3, the most notable alternative move is 5...Bb4+, the Romanishin Variation. It most often continues 6.c3 Be7.

== Schmidt Variation: 4.Nxd4 Nf6 ==
Position: a8 black rook, c8 black bishop, d8 black queen, e8 black king, f8 black bishop, h8 black rook, a7 black pawn, b7 black pawn, c7 black pawn, d7 black pawn, f7 black pawn, g7 black pawn, h7 black pawn, c6 black knight, f6 black knight, d4 white knight, e4 white pawn, a2 white pawn, b2 white pawn, c2 white pawn, f2 white pawn, g2 white pawn, h2 white pawn, a1 white rook, b1 white knight, c1 white bishop, d1 white queen, e1 white king, f1 white bishop, h1 white rook

Schmidt Variation: 4.Nxd4 Nf6

The move 4...Nf6, the Schmidt Variation, was first recorded in an article by Eugen von Schmidt in the January 1865 issue of 'Schachzeitung'. Play usually continues 5.Nxc6 bxc6 (5...dxc6 allows 6.Qxd8+ Kxd8). The only notable alternative for White is 5.Nc3, which transposes to the Scotch Variation of the Four Knights Game, with the usual continuation 5...Bb4 6.Nxc6 bxc6 7.Bd3 d5 8.exd5 cxd5 9.0-0 0-0 10.Bg5 c6 (or other move orders).

After 5.Nxc6 bxc6, the most common move is 6.e5, known as the Mieses Variation. In Schmidt's original analysis, he instead recommended 6.Bd3, defending the pawn on e4, which remains the second most common response today, and most often continues 6...d5, followed by either 7.exd5 cxd5 8.0-0 Be7 or 7.e5 Ng4 8.0-0 Bc5. Alternative sixth moves for White involve other methods of defending the pawn, such as 6.Nd2, the Tartakower Variation, most often continuing 6...d5 (or 6...Bc5) 7.exd5 cxd5 8.Bb5+ Bd7 9.Bxd7+ Qxd7 10.0-0 Be7 11.c3; or 6.Qe2, a modern try, which has many possible replies.

=== Mieses Variation: 6.e5 ===
Position: a8 black rook, c8 black bishop, e8 black king, f8 black bishop, h8 black rook, a7 black pawn, c7 black pawn, d7 black pawn, e7 black queen, f7 black pawn, g7 black pawn, h7 black pawn, c6 black pawn, d5 black knight, e5 white pawn, c4 white pawn, a2 white pawn, b2 white pawn, e2 white queen, f2 white pawn, g2 white pawn, h2 white pawn, a1 white rook, b1 white knight, c1 white bishop, e1 white king, f1 white bishop, h1 white rook

Mieses Variation, main line: 4.Nxd4 Nf6 5.Nxc6 bxc6 6.e5 Qe7 7.Qe2 Nd5 8.c4

This is a sharp variation, considered arguably the most testing line of the Scotch Game. It has frequently been played by Garry Kasparov. After the main line 6.e5 Qe7 7.Qe2 Nd5 8.c4, Black has the options of 8...Nb6, retreating the knight, and 8...Ba6, pinning White's pawn on c4 to the white queen. Black can also opt out of the forcing lines following 6...Qe7 with the more solid 6...Ne4 or 6...Nd5.

Jacques Mieses employed the line repeatedly at the Hastings 1895 chess tournament, including in a first-round win over Joseph Henry Blackburne; these games contributed to the variation being named after him.

Schmidt did not prefer this line, arguing that after 8...Nb6 9.Bf4 Ba6 10.Nd2 Qb4 11.0-0-0 Rb8, Black was better, apparently assuming White would attempt to castle as soon as possible by developing the bishop to f4. The alternatives 9.Nc3, 9.Nd2, and 9.b3 (intending a queenside fianchetto) are typically played today instead.

== Steinitz Variation: 4.Nxd4 Qh4 ==
Position: a8 black rook, c8 black bishop, d8 black king, h8 black rook, a7 black pawn, b7 black pawn, c7 black pawn, d7 black pawn, f7 black pawn, g7 black pawn, h7 black pawn, c6 black knight, f6 black knight, b5 white knight, e4 black queen, c3 white pawn, a2 white pawn, c2 white pawn, e2 white bishop, f2 white pawn, g2 white pawn, h2 white pawn, a1 white rook, c1 white bishop, d1 white queen, f1 white rook, g1 white king

Steinitz Variation, main line: 4.Nxd4 Qh4 5.Nc3 Bb4 6.Be2 Qxe4 7.Nb5 Bxc3+ 8.bxc3 Kd8 9.0-0 Nf6

Popularised by Wilhelm Steinitz, 4...Qh4 almost wins a pawn by force, but White gets a lead in development and attacking chances as compensation. The most successful line for White has been 5.Nc3 Bb4 6.Be2 Qxe4 7.Nb5 Bxc3+ 8.bxc3 Kd8 9.0-0, from which Black's awkwardly placed king has generally proven more significant than the extra pawn.

The main alternative for White is 5.Nb5, known as the Horwitz Attack. Black usually responds with 5...Qxe4+, most often transposing to the main line outlined above, 5...Bc5, which continues 6.Qe2 or 6.Qf3, or 5...Bb4+, which usually continues with 6.Bd2 or 6.c3. A common line is 6.Bd2 Qxe4+ 7.Be2 Kd8 8.0-0 Bxd2.

Lesser played alternatives include 5.Nf3 (the Fraser Variation), usually continuing 5...Qxe4+ 6.Be2 Bb4+ 7.c3 Be7 8.0-0, 5.Qd3, and 5.Be3 (the Braune Variation).

== Black's fourth-move alternatives ==
- 4...Qf6 most often transposes to the Classical Variation following 5.Be3 Bc5 or 5.Nxc6 Bc5. 5.Nb3 and 5.c3 often result in later transposition. 5.Nf3 and 5.Nb5 (threatening 6.Nxc7+) are also common.
- 4...Bb4+!?, the Malaniuk Variation, is "not as silly as it looks" according to John Emms. Although 5.c3 "gains a tempo", it has a downside in that it deprives the queen's knight of its natural development square. The main line continues 5...Bc5 6.Be3 (6.Nxc6 bxc6 is another option) Bb6. White can now play the quiet 7.Bc4, while 7.Nf5 and Kasparov's 7.Qg4 are more aggressive tries. Although it is debatable whether the extra move c3 is really a hindrance for White, the line has the advantage for Black of side-stepping mainstream Scotch theory.
- 4...Nxd4?! transposes to the dubious Lolli Variation.

== Scotch Gambit: 4.Bc4 ==
Position: a8 black rook, c8 black bishop, d8 black queen, e8 black king, f8 black bishop, g8 black knight, h8 black rook, a7 black pawn, b7 black pawn, c7 black pawn, d7 black pawn, f7 black pawn, g7 black pawn, h7 black pawn, c6 black knight, c4 white bishop, d4 black pawn, e4 white pawn, f3 white knight, a2 white pawn, b2 white pawn, c2 white pawn, f2 white pawn, g2 white pawn, h2 white pawn, a1 white rook, b1 white knight, c1 white bishop, d1 white queen, e1 white king, h1 white rook

Scotch Gambit: 4.Bc4

An aggressive try by White, this move prioritises development over immediately recapturing the pawn on d4. The c4-bishop eyes Black's pawn on f7, and White may later play Ng5, adding further pressure. The line may also be reached via the Italian Gambit by 1.e4 e5 2.Nf3 Nc6 3.Bc4 Bc5 4.d4 exd4; however, this move order gives Black the option of avoiding the Scotch with 4...Bxd4. After 4.Bc4, Black most often continues with either 4...Nf6, attacking White's pawn on e4, or 4...Bc5, defending Black's own pawn on d4.

=== 4...Nf6 ===
Position: a8 black rook, d8 black queen, e8 black king, h8 black rook, a7 black pawn, c7 black pawn, d7 black bishop, f7 black pawn, g7 black pawn, h7 black pawn, c6 black pawn, c5 black bishop, d5 black pawn, e5 white pawn, g5 black knight, d4 white knight, f3 white pawn, a2 white pawn, b2 white pawn, c2 white pawn, g2 white pawn, h2 white pawn, a1 white rook, b1 white knight, c1 white bishop, d1 white queen, f1 white rook, g1 white king

4...Nf6, main line: 5.e5 d5 6.Bb5 Ne4 7.Nxd4 Bd7 8.Bxc6 bxc6 9.0-0 Bc5 10.f3 Ng5

This is the most common continuation. It is identical to the Open Variation of the Two Knights Defence, to which it is considered a transposition. White's most common reply is 5.e5. The main line continues 5...d5 6.Bb5 Ne4 7.Nxd4 Bd7 8.Bxc6 bxc6 9.0-0 Bc5 10.f3 Ng5. There are several common deviations, most notably 5...Ne4, 5...Ng4, 6...Nd7, 7...Bc5, 9...Be7, and 10.Be3.

5.0-0 is also very common. It most often continues 5...Nxe4 6.Re1 d5 7.Bxd5 Qxd5 8.Nc3, dubbed the Anderssen Attack.

Another notable alternative is the riskier 5.Ng5, known as the Perreux Variation. It usually continues 5...Ne5 6.Qxd4 (or 6.Bb3) or 5...d5 6.exd5.

=== 4...Bc5 5.c3 ===
This move has little independent significance. The most common and arguably best response is 5...Nf6, transposing into the Classical Variation of the Giuoco Piano, a line in which Black is known to have a satisfactory game. Black can instead accept the gambit with 5...dxc3, but this is riskier because White gains a lead in development after 6.Bxf7+ Kxf7 7.Qd5+ and Qxc5. Alternatively, Black may decline the gambit with 5...d3, opening the diagonal for the bishop on c5 and depriving White's knight of its most natural square, c3. White usually responds with 6.b4 or 6.0-0.

=== 4...Bc5 5.Ng5 ===
This attack on the f-pawn is generally considered premature. Black's best response is 5...Nh6, most often continuing 6.Nxf7 Nxf7 7.Bxf7+ Kxf7 8.Qh5+ g6 9.Qxc5, regaining the material. This line violates normal opening principles by moving a piece twice, attacking before development is complete, and placing the queen where it is exposed to attack. For this reason it has traditionally been considered inferior, perhaps influenced by the well-known game Meek–Morphy, Mobile 1855.

The line has more recently appeared in grandmaster play, however, and seems to offer both sides approximately equal chances. Black's main options are 9...d5 and 9...d6. After 9...d5 Black's latent threats of Nb4 and Re8+ prevent capturing the pawn on d5; if 10.Bf4 dxe4 11.Nd2 Re8 12.0-0-0 Bf5, Black is seen as having the upper hand [Parma] The alternative is 9...d6, as played by Morphy, taking advantage of White's exposed queen to gain a tempo.

=== Other lines ===
- After 4...Bc5, 5.0-0 is the second most common response. It usually either transposes to the Max Lange Attack after 5...Nf6 6.e5 or leads to the Cochrane-Anderssen Variation after 5...d6 6.c3 Bg4.
- 4...Bb4+ is known as the London Defence. It usually continues 5.c3 dxc3, followed by 6.0-0 (inviting 6...cxb2 7.Bxb2, although Black usually plays 6...d6 or 6...Nf6 instead) or 6.bxc3.
- 4...d6 usually ends up transposing into another line. The most common continuation is 5.Nxd4, followed by 5...Nf6 or 5...g6.
- 4...Be7 transposes to the Hungarian Defence of the Italian Game.

== Göring Gambit: 4.c3 ==
Position: a8 black rook, c8 black bishop, d8 black queen, e8 black king, f8 black bishop, g8 black knight, h8 black rook, a7 black pawn, b7 black pawn, c7 black pawn, d7 black pawn, f7 black pawn, g7 black pawn, h7 black pawn, c6 black knight, d4 black pawn, e4 white pawn, c3 white pawn, f3 white knight, a2 white pawn, b2 white pawn, f2 white pawn, g2 white pawn, h2 white pawn, a1 white rook, b1 white knight, c1 white bishop, d1 white queen, e1 white king, f1 white bishop, h1 white rook

Göring Gambit: 4.c3

The Göring Gambit is a delayed version of the Danish Gambit (2.d4 exd4 3.c3), from which it may be reached by transposition. White sacrifices one or two pawns in return for a lead in development, and typically follows up by putting pressure on f7 with Bc4 and Qb3, and sometimes Ng5, while Nc3–d5 is another common motif. The gambit was first played at high levels by Howard Staunton in the 1840s, and the earliest game with it was probably played in 1843. The first game with the gambit accepted may be Meek–Morphy, New York 1857. Carl Theodor Göring introduced it into master play in 1872. The gambit has been played by Alexander Alekhine, Ljubomir Ljubojević, David Bronstein, Frank Marshall, and Jonathan Penrose.

=== Single pawn gambit: 4...dxc3 5.Nxc3 ===
If Black accepts the gambit with 4...dxc3, White can commit to sacrificing only one pawn with 5.Nxc3. Black's most critical response is generally considered to be 5...Bb4, when White does not get enough compensation after 6.Bc4 d6 7.0-0 Bxc3 8.bxc3 Nf6!, when 9.Ba3 Bg4 is insufficient and 9.e5 Nxe5 10.Nxe5 dxe5 11.Qb3 (11.Qxd8+ Kxd8 12.Bxf7 Ke7 is also good for Black) 11...Qe7 12.Ba3 c5 does not give enough compensation for two pawns.

White can deviate with 7.Qb3, where the old main line runs 7...Qe7 8.0-0 Bxc3, and here 9.Qxc3 gives White good compensation. Thus both John Watson and USCF master Mark Morss recommend 7...Bxc3+, in order to meet 8.Qxc3 with 8...Qf6! when White loses too much time with the queen. Thus White often continues 8.bxc3 when 8...Qe7 9.0-0 Nf6 can be met by 10.e5 (transposing back to lines arising from 7.0-0 Bxc3 8.bxc3 Nf6 9.e5, though these are insufficient for White) or the relatively unexplored 10.Bg5. Other deviations for White include 7.Ng5 and 6.Bg5.

Black can deviate with 6...Nf6, known as the Bardeleben Variation. Without Black having played ...d6, White may opt to play 7.e5 instead of 7.0-0. Play most often continues 8.exf6 dxc4 9.Qxd8+ Nxd8 10.fxg7 Rg8 11.Bh6.

Black's main alternative to 5...Bb4 is 5...d6, which usually leads to complications and approximately equal chances after 6.Bc4 Nf6 7.Qb3 Qd7 8.Ng5 Ne5 9.Bb5 c6 10.f4, or 7.Ng5 Ne5 8.Bb3 h6 9.f4. Black can also play 6...Be6, usually leading to the exchange 7.Bxe6 fxe6, followed by 8.Qb3. 5...Nf6 is weak due to 6.e5 Ng4 7.Qe2, where the threat of 8.h3 (kicking the knight) leaves Black with little better than 7...d6 (or 7...d5) 8.exd6+ Bxe6 9.dxc7. 5...Bc5 is also playable, transposing to the Scotch Gambit after 6.Bc4.

=== Double pawn gambit: 4...dxc3 5.Bc4 ===
Alternatively, White can offer a second pawn with 5.Bc4. If Black does not accept the second pawn with 5...cxb2, then White can avoid Black's most critical response to 5.Nxc3 (5...Bb4 6.Bc4 d6). Black's most common replies are 5...d6, usually transposing to the 5.Nxc3 d6 line, as well as 5...Nf6, usually transposing to either the Bardeleben Variation after 6.Nxc3 Bb4 or the 5.Nxc3 d6 line. 5.Nxc3 Bb4 6.Bc4 Nf6 line. 5...Bb4 transposes to the London Defence of the Scotch Gambit and is well met by 6.0-0 or 6.bxc3.

If Black accepts the second pawn with 5...cxb2 6.Bxb2, Unlike in the Danish proper, having committed the queen's knight to c6, Black cannot safely meet 6.Bxb2 with 6...d5. Instead, play often continues 6...d6 7.0-0 Be6 8.Bxe6 fxe6 9.Qb3 Qd7 or 7.Qb3 Qd7 8.Bc3 Nh6. 6...Bb4+ is the main alternative for Black, whereupon an approach with queenside castling is considered dangerous for Black, e.g. 7.Nc3 Nf6 8.Qc2 d6 9.0-0-0.

=== Göring Gambit Declined, main line: 4...d5 ===
This line is seen as a strong option for Black to equalise. The critical line runs 5.exd5 Qxd5 6.cxd4 Bg4 7.Be2 Bb4+ 8.Nc3 Bxf3 9.Bxf3 Qc4 (or 6...Bb4+ 7.Nc3 Bg4 8.Be2 Bxf3 9.Bxf3 Qc4, leading to the same position), often referred to as the Capablanca Variation in view of the strength of Black's concept in the game Marshall–Capablanca, Lake Hopatcong 1926. This line (which can also arise from the Chigorin Defence to the Queen's Gambit), forcing White to either exchange queens or forgo the right to castle with the risky 10.Be3, deters many players from employing this gambit. Equal endgames result after either 10.Qb3 Qxb3 11.axb3 Nge7 or 10.Bxc6+ bxc6 11.Qe2+ Qxe2+ 12.Kxe2 Ne7. If Black avoids steering for Capablanca's ending, e.g. with 6...Nf6 or 7...0-0-0 in the above lines, then White obtains good piece play in return for the isolated d-pawn. White can deviate with 6...Bg4 7.Nc3, with the idea of meeting 7...Bb4 with 8.a3 (or 6...Bb4+ 7.Nc3 Bg4 8.a3) or the rare 5.Bd3, neither of which promise an advantage but which avoid those endings.

=== Other lines ===
- 4...Nf6 transposes to a line of the Ponziani Opening. The continuation 5.e5 Ne4 was endorsed by Dangerous Weapons, 1.e4 e5 (Everyman Chess, 2008), but Tim Harding considers 5...Nd5 a better try for equality, when White can continue 6.Bb5 a6 7.Ba4 Nb6 8.Bb3, 6.Qb3, 6.Bc4 or 6.cxd4.
- 4...d3 is another option for Black to decline the gambit, denying the square c3 from White's knight, but White has a strong lead in development after 5.Bxd3.
- 4...Nge7, intending 5...d5, is another possibility. Black has been argued to be equalizing after 5.Bc4 d5 6.exd5 Nxd5 7.0-0 Be7. White also has the alternatives of 5.cxd4, usually continuing 5...d5 6.e5 Bg4 7.Be2, and 5.Nxd4.

== Other lines ==
- 3...exd4 4.Bb5 is known as the Relfsson Gambit. Black most often responds with 4...a6 or 4...Bc5. In the former, the usual continuation is 5.Ba4, after which 5...Nf6 transposes to the Mackenzie Variation of the Ruy Lopez (3.Bb5); 5...Bc5 is a common alternative. After 4...Bc5, White can regain the pawn after 5.Nbd2 a6 6.Bxc6 dxc6 7.Nb3 Ba7 8.Nbxd4, but permits 8...c5 9.Ne2 Qxd1+ 10.Kxd1, leaving the king unable to castle. 5.0-0 is a more common alternative.
- 3...Nxd4, the Lolli Variation, was popular in the 19th century and received five columns of analysis in Freeborough and Ranken's 1896 opening manual Chess Openings Ancient and Modern. It is often described today as a strategic error, since after 4.Nxd4 exd4 5.Qxd4 (5.Bc4 is known as the Napoleon Gambit) White's queen stands on a central square and cannot be chased away very effectively (5...c5? is a seriously weakening move that blocks Black's king's bishop). Nonetheless, the Encyclopaedia of Chess Openings (ECO) concludes that Black equalises with 5...Ne7 6.Bc4 Nc6 7.Qd5 Qf6 8.0-0 Ne5 9.Be2 c6 10.Qb3 Ng6 11.f4 Bc5+ 12.Kh1 d6 (I. Sokolov). Similarly, Harald Keilhack concludes in Knight on the Left: 1.Nc3 (p. 21) that although ...Nxd4 is a "non-line" these days, if Black continues perfectly it is not clear that White gets even a small advantage. Keilhack analyses 5.Qxd4 d6 6.Nc3 Nf6 7.Bc4 Be7 8.0-0 0-0 9.Bg5 c6 10.a4 Qa5 11.Bh4 and now after 11...Qe5 or 11...Be6, "White has at most this indescribable nothingness which is the advantage of the first move." (Id. p. 25) The ECO also concludes that Black equalises after the alternative 4.Nxe5 Ne6 5.Bc4 Nf6 6.Nc3 Be7 7.0-0 0-0 8.Be3 d6 9.Nd3 Nxe4 10.Nxe4 d5 (Parma). The main line 3...exd4 4.Nxd4 may transpose into this position if Black chooses to play 4...Nxd4.
- 3...d6?! is regarded as playable but inferior for Black. White can respond with 4.d5 and kick the knight. The usual continuation is 4...Nce7 5.c4, a position also frequently reached by transposition. Black then usually continues with 5...f5, 5...g6 (often transposing to the Modern Defence), or 5...Nf6 6.Nc3 Ng6 or 5...Ng6 6.Nc3 Nf6, which transpose to the Black Knights' Tango. Alternatives for White include 4.dxe5, commonly continuing 4...dxe5 5.Qxd8+ Kxd8 or 4...Nxe5 5.Nxe5 dxe5 5.Qxd8+ Kxd8; 4.Bb5, transposing to the Old Steinitz Defence of the Ruy Lopez; 4.Nc3, entering a line of the Three Knights Game; as well as 4.Bc4, entering a line of the Italian Game, or the Scotch Gambit if Black plays 4...exd4.
- 3...f5?! 4.Nxe5 transposes into a line of the dubious Latvian Gambit.

== See also ==
- List of chess openings
- List of chess openings named after places
