= Hungarian Defense =

Position: a8 black rook, c8 black bishop, d8 black queen, e8 black king, g8 black knight, h8 black rook, a7 black pawn, b7 black pawn, c7 black pawn, d7 black pawn, e7 black bishop, f7 black pawn, g7 black pawn, h7 black pawn, c6 black knight, e5 black pawn, c4 white bishop, e4 white pawn, f3 white knight, a2 white pawn, b2 white pawn, c2 white pawn, d2 white pawn, f2 white pawn, g2 white pawn, h2 white pawn, a1 white rook, b1 white knight, c1 white bishop, d1 white queen, e1 white king, h1 white rook
- Moves: 1.e4 e5 2.Nf3 Nc6 3.Bc4 Be7
- ECO: C50
- Origin: 18th century
- Named after: Paris Chess Club vs. City of Budapest, corr. 1843
- Parent: Italian Game

The Hungarian Defense is a chess opening that begins with the moves:

1. e4 e5
2. Nf3 Nc6
3. Bc4 Be7

The Hungarian Defense is a line in the Italian Game typically chosen as a quiet response to the White's aggressive move 3.Bc4. With the move 3...Be7, Black avoids the complexities of the Two Knights Defense (3...Nf6) and Giuoco Piano (3...Bc5).

White has an advantage in space and freer development, so Black must be prepared to defend a cramped position. According to Harding and Botterill, "The Hungarian Defence can only be played for a draw. White should have an edge in most lines."

The opening is seldom seen in modern play. It has been played on occasion by some grandmasters with strong defensive-positional styles, including Reshevsky, Hort, and former world champions Petrosian and Smyslov.

The variation takes its name from a correspondence game between Paris and Pest, Hungary, played from 1842 to 1845, but was first analyzed by Cozio in the 18th century.

== Main Line: 4.d4 ==
White's best response is 4.d4 (4.d3 Nf6 transposes to the Two Knights Defense), seeking advantage in the center. There are several alternatives that are less well regarded, including 4.c3 Nf6 (Steinitz), and 4.0-0 Nf6 5.Nc3 d6 6.d4 Bg4. After 4.d4, Black continues either 4...exd4 or 4...d6. Eventual transposition to the Scotch Game or the Philidor Defence is not uncommon.

=== 4...exd4 ===
After 4...exd4, 5.Nxd4 transposes into a variation of the Scotch Game that gives White a spatial advantage. Weaker is 5.c3, hoping for 5...dxc3?! 6.Qd5!, after which Black resigned in the game Midjord–Scharf, Nice Olympiad 1974 (though Black could have tried 6...Nh6 7.Bxh6 0-0 when 8.Bc1? Nb4 9.Qd1 c2 wins back the piece, so White should play 8.Bxg7 Kxg7 9.Nxc3 with advantage). Instead of 5...dxc3, however, Black can play 5...Na5 (recommended by Chigorin), forcing White to give up the bishop pair with 6.Qxd4 or sacrifice a pawn. Also playable is 5...Nf6 6.e5 Ne4 (the Tartakower Variation) 7.Bd5 Nc5 8.cxd4 Ne6 (Evans), but after 9.Bb3 White has the upper hand (Unzicker).

=== 4...d6 ===
Alternatively, Black generally tries to hold the center with 4...d6, when White has a choice of plans, each of which should be enough to secure a slight advantage. White can simplify to a slightly better queenless middlegame with 5.dxe5 dxe5 (5...Nxe5? 6.Nxe5 dxe5 7.Qh5! and White's double attack on e5 and f7 wins a pawn) 6.Qxd8+ (6.Bd5!? is also possible) Bxd8 7.Nc3 Nf6, or 7...f6. Or White can close the center with 5.d5 Nb8, followed by Bd3 and expansion on the queenside with c4, resulting in positions resembling those from the Old Indian Defense. Finally, with 5.Nc3 White can retain tension in the center and obtain active piece play.

== See also ==
- List of chess openings
- List of chess openings named after places
