= Alexander Fritz =

German chess player

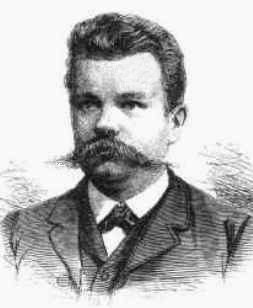

Personal information
- Born: January 15, 1857 Kirchlotheim, Vöhl
- Died: April 22, 1932 (aged 75) Alsfeld

Alexander Fritz (15 January 1857 – 22 April 1932) was a German chess master.

He tied for fifth/sixth with Wilfried Paulsen at Frankfurt 1878 (the 12th WDSB-Congress, Louis Paulsen won), took 9th at Braunschweig 1880 (the 13th WDSB-Congress, L. Paulsen won), took 13th at Wiesbaden 1880 (Joseph Henry Blackburne, Adolf Schwarz, and Berthold Englisch won).

He participated in the DSB Congress five times and took 16th at Nuremberg 1883 (the third DSB-Congress, Szymon Winawer won), took 20th place at Frankfurt 1887 (the fifth DSB-Congress, George Henry Mackenzie won), tied for 13-14th at Breslau 1889 (the sixth DSB-Congress, Siegbert Tarrasch won), took 15th at Cologne 1898 (the 11th DSB-Congress, Amos Burn won), and took 16th at Düsseldorf 1908 (the 16th DSB-Congress, Frank James Marshall won).

He often put on blindfold exhibitions. In one he scored eight wins, two draws and two losses including this game: G. Deurer – Alexander Fritz 1.e4 e5 2.Nf3 Nc6 3.Bc4 Bc5 4.0-0 d6 5.c3 Bg4 6.Qb3 Bxf3 7.Bxf7+ Kf8 8.Bxg8 Rxg8 9.gxf3 Qc8 10.Kh1 g5!? 11.d3 g4! 12.f4 g3!! 13.fxg3 Qh3 14.Rf3 Rxg3!! 0-1

His name is attached to the Fritz Variation in the Two Knights Defense or Prussian Game (1.e4 e5 2.Nf3 Nc6 3.Bc4 Nf6 4.Ng5 d5 5.exd5 Nd4).
