= Gambit =

Sacrificial chess opening

Position: a8 black rook, b8 black knight, c8 black bishop, d8 black queen, e8 black king, f8 black bishop, g8 black knight, h8 black rook, a7 black pawn, b7 black pawn, c7 black pawn, d7 black pawn, f7 black pawn, g7 black pawn, h7 black pawn, e5 black pawn, e4 white pawn, f4 white pawn, a2 white pawn, b2 white pawn, c2 white pawn, d2 white pawn, g2 white pawn, h2 white pawn, a1 white rook, b1 white knight, c1 white bishop, d1 white queen, e1 white king, f1 white bishop, g1 white knight, h1 white rook

King's Gambit: 1.e4 e5 2.f4. If Black takes the pawn (...exf4), White has a stronger attack in the opening.

A gambit (from Italian gambetto, the act of tripping someone with the leg to make them fall) is a chess opening in which a player sacrifices material with the aim of achieving a subsequent positional advantage.

== Terminology ==
The Spanish word gambito was originally applied to chess openings in 1561 by Ruy López de Segura, from an Italian expression dare il gambetto (to put a leg forward in order to trip someone). In English, the word first appeared in Francis Beale's 1656 translation of a Gioachino Greco manuscript, The Royall Game of Chesse-play ("illustrated with almost one hundred Gambetts"). The Spanish gambito led to French gambit, which has influenced the English spelling of the word. The metaphorical sense of the word as "opening move meant to gain advantage" was first recorded in English in 1855.

Gambits are more commonly played by White. Some well-known examples of a gambit are the King's Gambit (1.e4 e5 2.f4) and Evans Gambit (1.e4 e5 2.Nf3 Nc6 3.Bc4 Bc5 4.b4). A gambit employed by Black may also be named a gambit, e.g. the Latvian Gambit (1.e4 e5 2.Nf3 f5), or Englund Gambit (1.d4 e5); but is sometimes named a "countergambit", e.g. the Albin Countergambit (1.d4 d5 2.c4 e5) and Greco Countergambit (the original name for the Latvian Gambit). The term "countergambit" may also be instead defined as a gambit offered by Black in response to a gambit by White, such as the Albin and the Falkbeer Countergambit, but not the Latvian. Not all opening lines involving the sacrifice of material are named as gambits, for example the main line of the Two Knights Defense (1.e4 e5 2.Nf3 Nc6 3.Bc4 Nf6 4.Ng5 d5 5.exd5 Na5) in which Black sacrifices a pawn for active play is known as the "Knorre Variation", though it may be described as a "gambit". On the other hand, the Queen's Gambit (1.d4 d5 2.c4) is not a true gambit as Black cannot hold the pawn without incurring a disadvantage. As is often the case with chess openings, nomenclature is inconsistent.

== Strategy ==
Position: a8 black rook, b8 black knight, c8 black bishop, d8 black queen, e8 black king, f8 black bishop, g8 black knight, h8 black rook, a7 black pawn, b7 black pawn, c7 black pawn, e7 black pawn, f7 black pawn, g7 black pawn, h7 black pawn, c4 black pawn, d4 white pawn, a2 white pawn, b2 white pawn, e2 white pawn, f2 white pawn, g2 white pawn, h2 white pawn, a1 white rook, b1 white knight, c1 white bishop, d1 white queen, e1 white king, f1 white bishop, g1 white knight, h1 white rook

Queen's Gambit Accepted

Position: a8 black rook, b8 black knight, c8 black bishop, d8 black queen, e8 black king, f8 black bishop, g8 black knight, h8 black rook, a7 black pawn, b7 black pawn, c7 black pawn, f7 black pawn, g7 black pawn, h7 black pawn, e6 black pawn, d5 black pawn, c4 white pawn, d4 white pawn, a2 white pawn, b2 white pawn, e2 white pawn, f2 white pawn, g2 white pawn, h2 white pawn, a1 white rook, b1 white knight, c1 white bishop, d1 white queen, e1 white king, f1 white bishop, g1 white knight, h1 white rook

Queen's Gambit Declined

Gambits are described as being "offered" to an opponent, and that offer is then said to be either "accepted" or "declined".

In modern chess, the typical response to a moderately sound gambit is to accept the material and give the material back at an advantageous time. For gambits that are less sound, the accepting player is more likely to try to hold on to their extra material. A rule of thumb often found in various primers on chess suggests that a player should get three moves (see tempo) of development for a sacrificed pawn, but it is unclear how useful this general maxim is since the "free moves" part of the compensation is almost never the entirety of what the gambiteer gains. Often, a gambit can be declined with no disadvantage.

== Soundness ==
A gambit is said to be 'sound' if it is capable of procuring adequate concessions from the opponent. There are three general criteria in which a gambit is often said to be sound:

1. Time gain: the player accepting the gambit must take time to procure the sacrificed material and possibly must use more time to reorganize their pieces after the material is taken.
2. Generation of differential activity: often a player accepting a gambit will decentralize their pieces or pawns and their poorly placed pieces will allow the gambiteer to place their own pieces and pawns on squares that might otherwise have been inaccessible. In addition, bishops and rooks can become more active simply because the loss of pawns often gives rise to open files and diagonals. Former world champion Mikhail Tal once reportedly told Mikhail Botvinnik that he had sacrificed a pawn because it was simply in the way.
3. Generation of positional weaknesses: finally, accepting a gambit may lead to a compromised pawn structure, holes or other positional deficiencies.

An example of a sound gambit is the Scotch Gambit: 1.e4 e5 2.Nf3 Nc6 3.d4 exd4 4.Bc4. Here Black can force White to sacrifice a pawn speculatively with 4...Bb4+, but White gets very good compensation for one pawn after 5.c3 dxc3 6.bxc3, or for two pawns after 6.0-0 inviting 6...cxb2 7.Bxb2, due to the development advantage and attacking chances against the black king. As a result, Black is often advised not to try to hold on to the extra pawn. A more dubious gambit is the so-called Halloween Gambit: 1.e4 e5 2.Nf3 Nc6 3.Nc3 Nf6 4.Nxe5?! Nxe5 5.d4. Here the investment (a knight for just one pawn) is too large for the moderate advantage of having a strong center.

== Examples ==
- King's Gambit: 1.e4 e5 2.f4
- Queen's Gambit: 1.d4 d5 2.c4
- Evans Gambit: 1.e4 e5 2.Nf3 Nc6 3.Bc4 Bc5 4.b4
- Jaenisch Gambit: 1.e4 e5 2.Nf3 Nc6 3.Bb5 f5
- Rousseau Gambit: 1.e4 e5 2.Nf3 Nc6 3.Bc4 f5
- Smith–Morra Gambit: 1.e4 c5 2.d4 intending 2...cxd4 3.c3 dxc3 4.Nxc3
- Two Knights Defense: 1.e4 e5 2.Nf3 Nc6 3.Bc4 Nf6 4.Ng5 d5 with 5.exd5 Na5 6.Bb5+ c6 7.dxc6 bxc6 likely to follow
- Blackmar–Diemer Gambit (BDG): 1.d4 d5 2.e4 dxe4 3.Nc3 followed by 4.f3
- From's Gambit: 1.f4 e5
- Staunton Gambit: 1.d4 f5 2.e4
- Budapest Gambit: 1.d4 Nf6 2.c4 e5
- Scotch Gambit: 1.e4 e5 2.Nf3 Nc6 3.d4 exd4 4.Bc4
- Latvian Gambit: 1.e4 e5 2.Nf3 f5
- Danish Gambit: 1.e4 e5 2.d4 exd4 3. c3
- Blackburne Shilling Gambit: 1.e4 e5 2.Nf3 Nc6 3.Bc4 Nd4?!
- Elephant Gambit: 1.e4 e5 2.Nf3 d5!?
- Englund Gambit: 1.d4 e5?!
- Italian Gambit: 1.e4 e5 2.Nf3 Nc6 3.Bc4 Bc5 4.d4
- Fried Liver Attack: 1.e4 e5 2.Nf3 Nc6 3.Bc4 Nf6 4.Ng5 d5 5.exd5 Nxd5 6.Nxf7 Kxf7
- Albin Countergambit: 1.d4 d5 2.c4 e5
- Benko Gambit: 1.d4 Nf6 2.c4 c5 3.d5 b5
- Milner Barry Gambit: 1.e4 e6 2.d4 d5 3.e5 c5 4.c3 Nc6 5.Nf3 Qb6 6.Bd3 cxd4 7.cxd4 Bd7 8.Nc3 Nxd4 9.Nxd4 Qxd4
- Vienna Gambit: 1.e4 e5 2.Nc3 Nf6 3.f4
