= Two Knights Defense =

Chess opening

Position: a8 black rook, c8 black bishop, d8 black queen, e8 black king, f8 black bishop, h8 black rook, a7 black pawn, b7 black pawn, c7 black pawn, d7 black pawn, f7 black pawn, g7 black pawn, h7 black pawn, c6 black knight, f6 black knight, e5 black pawn, c4 white bishop, e4 white pawn, f3 white knight, a2 white pawn, b2 white pawn, c2 white pawn, d2 white pawn, f2 white pawn, g2 white pawn, h2 white pawn, a1 white rook, b1 white knight, c1 white bishop, d1 white queen, e1 white king, h1 white rook
- Moves: 1.e4 e5 2.Nf3 Nc6 3.Bc4 Nf6
- ECO: C55–C59
- Origin: Late 16th century
- Parent: Italian Game
- Synonym: Prussian Defense

The Two Knights Defense (also called the Prussian Defense) is a chess opening that begins with the moves:

1. e4 e5
2. Nf3 Nc6
3. Bc4 Nf6

Black's third move threatens to capture White's pawn on e4. First recorded by Giulio Cesare Polerio in c. 1580, White’s traditional and most direct approach is 4.Ng5, threatening Black’s f-pawn, defended only by the king. The theory of this opening was extensively developed in the 19th century, when Mikhail Chigorin demonstrated Black's compensation in the line 4.Ng5 d5 5.exd5 Na5 6.Bb5+ c6 7.dxc6 bxc6, where Black gambits a pawn for a lead in development. White also frequently plays 4.d3, a more positional continuation often transposing to the Giuoco Pianissimo, or 4.d4, usually transposing to the Scotch Gambit.

The Two Knights is a more aggressive continuation than the Giuoco Piano (3...Bc5), which avoids the 4.Ng5 line. David Bronstein argued that the term "defense" doesn't capture the opening's true character and suggested "Chigorin Counterattack" as a more appropriate name. The Two Knights Defense has been played and analyzed by many aggressive players, including Chigorin, Paul Keres, and world champions Mikhail Tal and Boris Spassky.

== Chigorin's line: 4.Ng5 d5 5.exd5 Na5 6.Bb5+ c6 7.dxc6 bxc6 ==
Position: a8 black rook, c8 black bishop, d8 black queen, e8 black king, f8 black bishop, h8 black rook, a7 black pawn, b7 black pawn, c7 black pawn, d7 black pawn, f7 black pawn, g7 black pawn, h7 black pawn, c6 black knight, f6 black knight, e5 black pawn, g5 white knight, c4 white bishop, e4 white pawn, a2 white pawn, b2 white pawn, c2 white pawn, d2 white pawn, f2 white pawn, g2 white pawn, h2 white pawn, a1 white rook, b1 white knight, c1 white bishop, d1 white queen, e1 white king, h1 white rook

4.Ng5

Position: a8 black rook, c8 black bishop, d8 black queen, e8 black king, f8 black bishop, h8 black rook, a7 black pawn, b7 black pawn, c7 black pawn, f7 black pawn, g7 black pawn, h7 black pawn, f6 black knight, a5 black knight, d5 white pawn, e5 black pawn, g5 white knight, c4 white bishop, a2 white pawn, b2 white pawn, c2 white pawn, d2 white pawn, f2 white pawn, g2 white pawn, h2 white pawn, a1 white rook, b1 white knight, c1 white bishop, d1 white queen, e1 white king, h1 white rook

4.Ng5 d5 5.exd5 Na5

Position: a8 black rook, c8 black bishop, d8 black queen, e8 black king, f8 black bishop, h8 black rook, a7 black pawn, f7 black pawn, g7 black pawn, h7 black pawn, c6 black pawn, f6 black knight, a5 black knight, b5 white bishop, e5 black pawn, g5 white knight, a2 white pawn, b2 white pawn, c2 white pawn, d2 white pawn, f2 white pawn, g2 white pawn, h2 white pawn, a1 white rook, b1 white knight, c1 white bishop, d1 white queen, e1 white king, h1 white rook

6.Bb5+ c6 7.dxc6 bxc6

The move 4.Ng5 attacks Black's pawn on f7 in combination with White's bishop on c4. Common during the era of Romantic chess, the move attracted criticism from players of the Classical school who argued that it violates opening principles because it moves a piece twice and attacks before development is complete. The leading German master of the early 20th century, Siegbert Tarrasch, famously called 4.Ng5 "a duffer's move" (ein richtiger Stümperzug), also translated as "a typical example of a bungling move". 4.Ng5 experienced a revival in popularity in the late 20th century after being adopted in the 1990s by Alexander Morozevich and Nigel Short, though it remains less common than 4.d3. It has been employed by world champions Wilhelm Steinitz, Bobby Fischer, Anatoly Karpov, Garry Kasparov, and Viswanathan Anand.

The only good defense for Black is 4...d5, blocking White's bishop's line of attack. After 4...d5, 5.exd5 practically wins a pawn by force, although Black gains compensation with quick development and initiative. The standard reply is 5...Na5, which has been called the Chigorin Gambit, attacking the bishop before White can move the pawn and resume the attack. The main line continues 6.Bb5+ c6 7.dxc6 bxc6, after which 8.Bd3, 8.Be2, and 8.Qf3 (Bogoljubow Variation) are all common continuations. 8.Ba4? is a notable mistake; Black can win material after 8...h6 9.Nf3 (or 9.Nh3 Qd4) e4, as White's knight must either retreat to g1 or move to e5, in which case 10...Qd4 wins material. 6...Bd7 is also possible, as is 6.d3 (Kieseritzky Variation).

Notable alternatives to 5...Na5 are 5...Nd4 (Fritz Variation) and 5...b5 (Ulvestad Variation), which usually transpose into each other. Simply recapturing with 5...Nxd5?! is considered too risky of a move to play at the board, although it has not been definitively refuted.

Black can also ignore the threat to f7 on the fourth move, most notably with 4...Bc5!?, the Traxler Counterattack, which leads to wild complications. In general, the 4.Ng5 variation is known for extensive theoretical analysis and sharp tactical play.

=== Old main line: 8.Be2 h6 9.Nf3 e4 10.Ne5 ===
Position: a8 black rook, c8 black bishop, d8 black queen, e8 black king, f8 black bishop, h8 black rook, a7 black pawn, f7 black pawn, g7 black pawn, c6 black pawn, f6 black knight, h6 black pawn, a5 black knight, e5 white knight, e4 black pawn, a2 white pawn, b2 white pawn, c2 white pawn, d2 white pawn, e2 white bishop, f2 white pawn, g2 white pawn, h2 white pawn, a1 white rook, b1 white knight, c1 white bishop, d1 white queen, e1 white king, h1 white rook

8.Be2 h6 9.Nf3 e4 10.Ne5

8.Be2 is usually followed by 8...h6, where 9.Nf3 almost always continues 9...e4 10.Ne5. This leads to a position where White is behind in development but has an extra pawn as well as a better pawn structure; Black has two isolated pawns. This line was the main line of the 4.Ng5 variation since the 19th century, when Mikhail Chigorin demonstrated Black's compensation, but has been surpassed in popularity by 8.Bd3 and rivaled by 9.Nh3 and 8.Qf3.

After 10.Ne5, Black has four main moves: 10...Bd6, 10...Bc5, 10...Qc7, and 10...Qd4.

==== 10...Bd6 ====
Position: a8 black rook, c8 black bishop, f8 black rook, g8 black king, a7 black pawn, c7 black queen, f7 black pawn, g7 black pawn, c6 black pawn, d6 black bishop, f6 black knight, h6 black pawn, a5 black knight, b3 white pawn, d3 white knight, a2 white pawn, b2 white bishop, c2 white pawn, e2 white bishop, f2 white pawn, g2 white pawn, h2 white pawn, a1 white rook, b1 white knight, d1 white queen, e1 white king, h1 white rook

10...Bd6 11.d4 exd3 12.Nxd3 Qc7 13.b3 0-0 14.Bb2

Position: a8 black rook, c8 black bishop, e8 black king, h8 black rook, a7 black pawn, c7 black queen, f7 black pawn, g7 black pawn, c6 black pawn, d6 black bishop, f6 black knight, h6 black pawn, a5 black knight, e5 white knight, d4 white pawn, e4 black pawn, a2 white pawn, b2 white pawn, c2 white pawn, d2 white bishop, e2 white bishop, f2 white pawn, g2 white pawn, h2 white pawn, a1 white rook, b1 white knight, d1 white queen, e1 white king, h1 white rook

10...Bd6 11.d4 Qc7 12.Bd2

10...Bd6 is Black's most common next move. White's most common reply is 11.d4, though 11.f4 is an alternative. Black's most common reply after 11.d4 is 11...exd3 e.p., though 11...0-0 and 11...Qc7 are also seen, and 11...c5 has been advocated by Alexander Graf.

After 11.d4 exd3, the line continues 12.Nxd3 Qc7 (12...0-0 is also seen), after which White has a major choice on the thirteenth move. 13.b3, 13.h3, and 13.Nd2 are the primary options. 13.b3 is considered the main line, exerting control over c4 and enabling a queenside fianchetto. Play typically continues 13...0-0 14.Bb2, followed by 14...Ne4, 14...Re8, 14...Nd5, or 14...Bf5.

11.f4 is not regarded as not posing Black as many problems after 11...exf3 12.Nxf3 0-0. White may continue with 13.d4 or 13.0-0.

==== 10...Bc5 ====
Position: a8 black rook, c8 black bishop, d8 black queen, e8 black king, h8 black rook, a7 black pawn, f7 black pawn, g7 black pawn, c6 black pawn, f6 black knight, h6 black pawn, a5 black knight, c5 black bishop, e5 white knight, e4 black pawn, c3 white pawn, a2 white pawn, b2 white pawn, d2 white pawn, e2 white bishop, f2 white pawn, g2 white pawn, h2 white pawn, a1 white rook, b1 white knight, c1 white bishop, d1 white queen, e1 white king, h1 white rook

10.Ne5 Bc5 11.c3

10...Bc5 is Black's main alternative move, and prevents an immediate 11.d4. White's typical move is instead either 11.c3, preparing 12.b4 or 12.d4, or 11.0-0.

After 11.c3, Black has a choice between 11...Bd6, 11...Qc7, and 11...0-0. After 11...Qc7 12.d4, the line 12...exd3 13.Nxd3 Bd6 seems to give Black excellent compensation. 11...Bd6 may continue 12.f4 or 12.d4.

After 11.0-0, possible continuations include 11...Qd6, 11...Qd4, and 11...0-0. The 11...Qd6 line often leads to a series of exchanges with 12.d4 Qxd4 13.Qxd4 Bxd4 14.Nc4 Nxc4 15.Bxc4.

==== Other lines ====
Position: a8 black rook, c8 black bishop, e8 black king, h8 black rook, a7 black pawn, f7 black pawn, g7 black pawn, c6 black pawn, f6 black knight, h6 black pawn, a5 black knight, c5 black bishop, e5 white knight, d4 black queen, e4 black pawn, f4 white pawn, a2 white pawn, b2 white pawn, c2 white pawn, d2 white pawn, e2 white bishop, g2 white pawn, h2 white pawn, a1 white rook, b1 white knight, c1 white bishop, d1 white queen, e1 white king, f1 white rook

10.Ne5 Qd4 11.f4 Bc5 12.Rf1
- 10...Qc7, played by Carl Göring, often transposes to lines with 10...Bd6 or 10...Bc5. White's main move is 11.d4; 11.Ng4 is possible but regarded as inferior.
- 10...Qd4 tends to continue with 11.f4 Bc5 and then 12.Rf1, defending against the checkmate threat. White seems to retain an advantage but cannot castle kingside.

=== Steinitz Variation: 8.Be2 h6 9.Nh3 ===
Position: a8 black rook, c8 black bishop, d8 black queen, e8 black king, f8 black bishop, h8 black rook, a7 black pawn, f7 black pawn, g7 black pawn, c6 black pawn, f6 black knight, h6 black pawn, a5 black knight, e5 black pawn, h3 white knight, a2 white pawn, b2 white pawn, c2 white pawn, d2 white pawn, e2 white bishop, f2 white pawn, g2 white pawn, h2 white pawn, a1 white rook, b1 white knight, c1 white bishop, d1 white queen, e1 white king, h1 white rook

Steinitz Variation: 8.Be2 h6 9.Nh6

9.Nh3 is a variation popularized by Wilhelm Steinitz. Although it did not bring Steinitz success in his famous 1891 cable match against Mikhail Chigorin, Bobby Fischer revived it in the 1960s. Nigel Short led a second revival of 9.Nh3 in the 1990s, and today it is thought to be about equal in strength to the more common 9.Nf3.

9.Nh3 became slightly more frequently played than 9.Nf3 in the 21st century, but it has still lost popularity overall due to the rise of 8.Bd3. Black's common replies include 9...Bd6, 9...Bc5, 9...g5, 9...Be7, and 9...Bxh3. Black is regarded as having an easier-to-play game after 9...g5 and 9...Be7, but 9...Bd6 and 9...Bc5 are more frequent.

=== Bogoljubow Variation: 8.Qf3 ===
Position: a8 black rook, c8 black bishop, d8 black queen, e8 black king, f8 black bishop, h8 black rook, a7 black pawn, f7 black pawn, g7 black pawn, h7 black pawn, c6 black pawn, f6 black knight, a5 black knight, b5 white bishop, e5 black pawn, g5 white knight, f3 white queen, a2 white pawn, b2 white pawn, c2 white pawn, d2 white pawn, f2 white pawn, g2 white pawn, h2 white pawn, a1 white rook, b1 white knight, c1 white bishop, e1 white king, h1 white rook

Bogoljubow Variation: 8.Qf3

Position: e8 black king, f8 black bishop, h8 black rook, a7 black pawn, c7 black queen, f7 black pawn, g7 black pawn, h7 black pawn, f6 black knight, b5 black pawn, e5 black pawn, g5 white knight, g4 black bishop, a3 white knight, c3 white pawn, g3 white queen, a2 white pawn, b2 white pawn, d2 white pawn, e2 black knight, f2 white pawn, g2 white pawn, h2 white pawn, a1 white rook, c1 white bishop, e1 white king, h1 white rook

8.Qf3 cxb5 9.Qxa8 Qc7 10.Qf3 Nc6 11.c3 Bg4 12.Qg3 Nd4 13.Na3 Ne2

Named after Efim Bogoljubow, 8.Qf3 pins Black's pawn on c6 to the rook on a8. It is possible to sacrifice the rook with 8...cxb5, a line played by Joseph Henry Blackburne, though more common are 8...Be7 (developing) and 8...Rb8 (unpinning). Another option is 8...h6, recommended by Jan Pinski.

After 8...cxb5 9.Qxa8, a possible continuation is 9...Qc7 10.Qf3 Nc6 11.c3 Bg4 12.Qg3 Nd4 13.Na3 Ne2.

=== New main line: 8.Bd3 ===
Position: a8 black rook, c8 black bishop, d8 black queen, e8 black king, f8 black bishop, h8 black rook, a7 black pawn, f7 black pawn, g7 black pawn, h7 black pawn, c6 black pawn, f6 black knight, a5 black knight, e5 black pawn, g5 white knight, d3 white bishop, a2 white pawn, b2 white pawn, c2 white pawn, d2 white pawn, f2 white pawn, g2 white pawn, h2 white pawn, a1 white rook, b1 white knight, c1 white bishop, d1 white queen, e1 white king, h1 white rook

8.Bd3

Position: a8 black rook, c8 black bishop, f8 black rook, g8 black king, a7 black pawn, h7 black pawn, c6 black pawn, d6 black bishop, e6 black knight, f6 black queen, a5 black knight, f5 black pawn, c4 white pawn, d4 white pawn, f3 white queen, a2 white pawn, b2 white pawn, f2 white pawn, g2 white pawn, h2 white pawn, a1 white rook, b1 white knight, c1 white bishop, e1 white rook, f1 white bishop, g1 white king

8.Bd3 Nd5 9.Nf3 Bd6 10.0-0 0-0 11.Re1 f5 12.Nxe5 Qf6 13.Nf3 g5 14.c4 Nf4 15.Bf1 g4 16.d4 gxf3 17.Qxf3 Ne6

8.Bd3 was still considered a mistake by Jan Pinski in 2004 but is now the main line of the 4.Ng5 variation. The line has some continuations involving White sacrificing a knight for two more pawns, leaving material equal given the pawn captured on the fifth move.

== Deviations from Chigorin's line ==
=== 6...Bd7 ===
Position: a8 black rook, d8 black queen, e8 black king, f8 black bishop, h8 black rook, a7 black pawn, b7 black pawn, c7 black pawn, d7 black bishop, f7 black pawn, g7 black pawn, h7 black pawn, f6 black knight, a5 black knight, b5 white bishop, d5 white pawn, e5 black pawn, g5 white knight, a2 white pawn, b2 white pawn, c2 white pawn, d2 white pawn, e2 white queen, f2 white pawn, g2 white pawn, h2 white pawn, a1 white rook, b1 white knight, c1 white bishop, e1 white king, h1 white rook

5...Na5 6.Bb5+ Bd7 7.Qe2

After 6...Bd7, White usually responds with 7.Qe2, defending the bishop and threatening Black's pawn. Black may reply with either 7...Bd6 or 7...Be7. Tim Harding wrote that 6...Bd7 was known to Polerio, who lived when 4.Ng5 d5 5.exd5 Nxd5?! was common.

=== Morphy Variation: 6.d3 ===
Position: a8 black rook, c8 black bishop, d8 black queen, e8 black king, f8 black bishop, h8 black rook, a7 black pawn, b7 black pawn, c7 black pawn, f7 black pawn, g7 black pawn, h7 black pawn, f6 black knight, a5 black knight, d5 white pawn, e5 black pawn, g5 white knight, c4 white bishop, d3 white pawn, a2 white pawn, b2 white pawn, c2 white pawn, f2 white pawn, g2 white pawn, h2 white pawn, a1 white rook, b1 white knight, c1 white bishop, d1 white queen, e1 white king, h1 white rook

Kieseritzky Variation: 4.Ng5 d5 5.exd5 Na5 6.d3

Instead of retreating the bishop, White may instead play to hold the gambit pawn with this move. Paul Morphy preferred this line, which has been named after Lionel Kieseritzky and is also known as the Morphy Variation. It is relatively unpopular since Black obtains good chances for the pawn with 6...h6 7.Nf3 e4 8.Qe2 Nxc4 9.dxc4 Bc5 and White effectively concedes the bishop pair. David Bronstein once tried the piece sacrifice 8.dxe4!? with success, but its soundness is doubtful.

=== Fritz Variation: 5...Nd4 ===
Position: a8 black rook, c8 black bishop, d8 black queen, e8 black king, f8 black bishop, h8 black rook, a7 black pawn, b7 black pawn, c7 black pawn, f7 black pawn, g7 black pawn, h7 black pawn, f6 black knight, d5 white pawn, e5 black pawn, g5 white knight, c4 white bishop, d4 black knight, a2 white pawn, b2 white pawn, c2 white pawn, d2 white pawn, f2 white pawn, g2 white pawn, h2 white pawn, a1 white rook, b1 white knight, c1 white bishop, d1 white queen, e1 white king, h1 white rook

Fritz Variation: 5...Nd4

German master Alexander Fritz (1857–1932) suggested 5...Nd4 to Carl Schlechter, who published analysis of the move in Deutsche Schachzeitung in 1904, concluding that it is fully viable. In 1907 P. S. Leonhardt disputed this assessment in his column for the Swedish journal Tidskrift för Schack, in which he advocated the now standard move (6.c3 b5) 7.Bf1!

6.d6 now is inferior. After 6...Qxd6 7.Nxf7? Qc6! simultaneously attacks the pawn on g2 and the bishop on c4, and if 8.Nxh8? (relatively best is 8.0-0, giving up the bishop) 8...Qxg2 9.Rf1 Qe4+ 10.Be2 Nf3#. White should instead play 7.Bxf7+ Ke7 8.Bb3 Nxb3 9.axb3 h6 10.Nf3 e4 11.Ng1 Kf7 and Black had good compensation for the pawn in Bogolyubov-Rubinstein, Stockholm 1919.

Instead, White's best reply is 6.c3, after which the game tends to continue 6...b5 7.Bf1! Nxd5, followed by either 8.cxd4, 8.Ne4, or 8.h4. Black also has the option of playing 6...Nf5 or 6...h6 instead of the usual 6...b5.

==== 6.c3 b5 7.Bf1 Nxd5 8.cxd4 ====
Position: a8 black rook, c8 black bishop, d8 black king, f8 black bishop, h8 black rook, a7 black pawn, c7 black pawn, f7 black pawn, g7 black pawn, h7 black pawn, b5 white bishop, d5 black knight, e5 black pawn, g5 black queen, d4 white pawn, a2 white pawn, b2 white pawn, d2 white pawn, f2 white pawn, g2 white pawn, h2 white pawn, a1 white rook, b1 white knight, c1 white bishop, d1 white queen, e1 white king, h1 white rook

6.c3 b5 7.Bf1 Nxd5 8.cxd4 Qxg5 9.Bxb5+ Kd8

After the usual 8...Qxg5 9.Bxb5+ Kd8, this line tends to continue with either 10.0-0 or 10.Qf3.

10.0-0 is typically followed by 10...Bb7 11.Qf3 Rb8 12.dxe5 (not 12.Qxf7? Nf6, which defends against mate on d7 while threatening mate on g2 and 13...Bd5, trapping White's queen) 12...Ne3! 13.Qh3 Qxg2+ 14.Qxg2 Nxg2 15.d4, where White is a pawn up in a sharp position.

10.Qf3 may be followed by 10...Bb7 11.0-0, transposing to the above line, but 10...exd4 is also possible, as in Wei Yi vs. Jan-Krzysztof Duda, 2014 World Junior Chess Championship

==== 6.c3 b5 7.Bf1 Nxd5 8.Ne4 ====
Position: a8 black rook, c8 black bishop, e8 black king, f8 black bishop, h8 black rook, a7 black pawn, c7 black pawn, f7 black pawn, g7 black pawn, h7 black pawn, b5 black pawn, d5 black knight, e5 black pawn, d4 black knight, e4 white knight, h4 black queen, c3 white pawn, a2 white pawn, b2 white pawn, d2 white pawn, f2 white pawn, g2 white pawn, h2 white pawn, a1 white rook, b1 white knight, c1 white bishop, d1 white queen, e1 white king, f1 white bishop, h1 white rook

Berliner Variation: 6.c3 b5 7.Bf1 Nxd5 8.Ne4 Qh4

This often continues with 8...Qh4, the Berliner Variation, named after World Correspondence Chess Champion Hans Berliner. The line was played in the famous game Estrin–Berliner, World Correspondence Championship 1965–68, eventually won by Black; this win was pivotal to Berliner's eventual championship victory. That game, which saw Black embark on a very sharp sacrificial path, continued 9.Ng3 Bg4 10.f3 e4 11.cxd4 Bd6 12.Bxb5+ Kd8 13.0-0 exf3. In 1971, IM / GMC Estrin later published a suggestion of the move 14.Qb3!? as an improvement on the game continuation, and this possibility has continued to interest many players.

8...Ne6 is the main alternative to 8...Qh4. It is a quieter line typically continuing with 9.Bxb5+ Bd7 10.Bxd7 Qxd7.

=== Ulvestad Variation: 5...b5 ===
Position: a8 black rook, c8 black bishop, d8 black queen, e8 black king, f8 black bishop, h8 black rook, a7 black pawn, c7 black pawn, f7 black pawn, g7 black pawn, h7 black pawn, c6 black knight, f6 black knight, b5 black pawn, d5 white pawn, e5 black pawn, g5 white knight, c4 white bishop, a2 white pawn, b2 white pawn, c2 white pawn, d2 white pawn, f2 white pawn, g2 white pawn, h2 white pawn, a1 white rook, b1 white knight, c1 white bishop, d1 white queen, e1 white king, h1 white rook

Ulvestad Variation: 5...b5

This line is related to the Fritz Variation as they share a common subvariation. American master Olav Ulvestad introduced 5...b5 in a 1941 article in Chess Review. White has only one good reply, the counterintuitive 6.Bf1!, protecting the undefended pawn on g2, so White can answer 6...Qxd5? with 7.Nc3. Both replies 6.Bxb5 Qxd5 7.Bxc6+ Qxc6 and 6.dxc6 bxc4 7.Nc3 are weak for White. After 6.Bf1!, Ulvestad's first idea 6...h6? is refuted by 7.Nxf7!. The move 6...Nxd5, Ulvestad's second idea, is considered Black's best response. Black can also transpose to the Fritz Variation with 6...Nd4, making another advantage of 6.Bf1 apparent; the bishop is not attacked as it would be if White had played 6.Be2.

=== 5...Nxd5?! ===
Position: a8 black rook, c8 black bishop, d8 black queen, f8 black bishop, h8 black rook, a7 black pawn, b7 black pawn, c7 black pawn, g7 black pawn, h7 black pawn, c6 black knight, e6 black king, d5 black knight, e5 black pawn, c4 white bishop, c3 white knight, f3 white queen, a2 white pawn, b2 white pawn, c2 white pawn, d2 white pawn, f2 white pawn, g2 white pawn, h2 white pawn, a1 white rook, c1 white bishop, e1 white king, h1 white rook

Fried Liver Attack: 6.Nxf7 Kxf7+ 7.Qf3+ Ke6 8.Nc3

This recapture is extremely risky. Albert Pinkus tried to bolster this move with analysis in 1943 and 1944 issues of Chess Review, but White gets a strong attack with either the Lolli Attack (6.d4), which Bobby Fischer thought to be very strong, or the sacrificial Fried Liver Attack (6.Nxf7), which leaves Black's king in the middle of the board after 6...Kxf7 7.Qf3+ Ke6 8.Nc3. These variations are usually considered too difficult for Black to defend over the board.

=== Traxler Variation: 4...Bc5 ===
Position: a8 black rook, c8 black bishop, d8 black queen, e8 black king, h8 black rook, a7 black pawn, b7 black pawn, c7 black pawn, d7 black pawn, f7 black pawn, g7 black pawn, h7 black pawn, c6 black knight, f6 black knight, c5 black bishop, e5 black pawn, g5 white knight, c4 white bishop, e4 white pawn, a2 white pawn, b2 white pawn, c2 white pawn, d2 white pawn, f2 white pawn, g2 white pawn, h2 white pawn, a1 white rook, b1 white knight, c1 white bishop, d1 white queen, e1 white king, h1 white rook

Traxler Variation: 4.Ng5 Bc5

The Traxler Variation, also known as the Wilkes-Barre Variation, ignores White's attack on f7 with a bold counterattack on f2 and leads to wild play. Its namesake, Czech problemist Karel Traxler, played it against Reinisch in Prague in 1890. Later, Frank Marshall named it after Wilkes-Barre, a town in Pennsylvania, claiming to be the first to analyze and publish it, so 4...Bc5 is also known as the Wilkes-Barre Variation in the United States and the United Kingdom.

No grandmasters have regularly adopted the Traxler as Black, but Alexander Beliavsky and Alexei Shirov have played it occasionally even in top competition. Beliavsky even ventured it twice, holding then-World Champion Karpov to a draw and defeating Anand. No clear refutation is known.

White can respond to the Traxler with 5.d4, 5.Nxf7, or 5.Bxf7+. After 5.d4 d5!, White's best move is 6.Bxd5, reapplying the pressure on f7. 5.Nxf7 is very complicated after 5...Bxf2+. The current main lines all are thought to lead to drawn or equal positions, e.g. after 6.Kxf2 Nxe4+ 7.Kg1, or even 7.Ke3. White may even play 6.Kf1 instead of 6.Kxf2 to avoid these lines.

==== 5.Bxf7+ ====
Black's most common move after 5.Bxf7+ is 5...Ke7. White's best try for an advantage is probably then 6.Bb3, although some writers such as Lawrence Trent recommend 6.Bd5. In either case, Black tends to respond with 6...Rf8.

A tricky variation is 5.Bxf7+ Kf8!?, where Black plays for one last trick with 6.Bb3 d6 7.Nf7 Qe7. If White plays the seemingly standard 8.Nxh8??, Black is now winning after 8...Bg4!! 9.f3 Nxe4, making use of the pinned f3-pawn. This pawn cannot capture the bishop as 10.fxg4?? Qh4+ 11.g3 Bf2+ wins by force for Black.

=== 4...Nxe4?! ===
Position: a8 black rook, c8 black bishop, d8 black queen, e8 black king, f8 black bishop, h8 black rook, a7 black pawn, b7 black pawn, c7 black pawn, d7 black pawn, f7 black pawn, g7 black pawn, h7 black pawn, c6 black knight, e5 black pawn, g5 white knight, c4 white bishop, e4 black knight, a2 white pawn, b2 white pawn, c2 white pawn, d2 white pawn, f2 white pawn, g2 white pawn, h2 white pawn, a1 white rook, b1 white knight, c1 white bishop, d1 white queen, e1 white king, h1 white rook

4...Nxe4

4...Nxe4?! is considered unsound but must be handled carefully. 5.Nxe4 d5 poses no problems for Black. If 5.Nxf7? Qh4! 6.g3 (6.0-0 Bc5!) 6...Qh3 7.Nxh8 Qg2 8.Rf1 Nd4 9.Qh5+ g6 10.Nxg6 hxg6 11.Qxg6+ Kd8 and Black has dangerous threats. (Alternatively, after 5.Nxf7? Qh4! 6.g3, Black could play more aggressively 6...Nxg3! 7.fxg3 Qe4+ 8.Qe2 Qxh1+ 9.Qf1 Qxf1+ 10.Kxf1 d5 11.Bxd5 Bh3+ 12.Ke1 Nb4 13.Bb3 Nxc2+ 14.Bxc2 Kxf7 with a distinct advantage of material for Black.) Correct is 5.Bxf7+! Ke7 6.d4! (6.d3 is also good) and now:

- 6...d5 7.Nc3! (best, discovered by Soviet player Lopukhin; White has a clear advantage) 7...Nxc3 8.bxc3 Qd6 (8...Bf5 9.Qf3±; 8...e4 9.f3!) 9.a4! Kd8 10.Bg8! Ke8 11.Bxh7± (Estrin).
- 6...h6 7.Nxe4 Kxf7 and now 8.dxe5 Qe8 9.f4 d6 10.0-0 (±) Kg8 11.Nbc3 dxe5 12. f5 Qf7 13.Nd5 Bd7 14.f6 g6 15.Ne7+! and White has excellent chances (Estrin).

== Closed Variation: 4.d3 ==
The quiet 4.d3 is White's most common fourth move. It is sometimes called the Modern Bishop's Opening,, being commonly reached from the Bishop's Opening via 2.Bc4 Nf6 3.d3 Nc6 (the most notable alternative being 3...c6) 4.Nf3. By playing d3, White tries to avoid the tactical battles that are common in other lines of the Two Knights and to enter a more positional game. The resulting positions take on some characteristics of the Ruy Lopez if White plays c3 and retreats the bishop to c2 via Bc4–b3–c2. This move became popular in the 1980s and has been used by John Nunn and others.

The most common response for Black is to play 4...Bc5, transposing to the Giuoco Pianissimo. Also common are 4...Be7, 4...h6, and 4...d5.

=== 4...Be7 ===
This line is also commonly reached from the Hungarian Defense when White opts out of the lines with d4.

=== 4...h6 ===
This intends 5...d6. 4...d6?! should not be played due to 5.Ng5, where Black must play 5...d5, transposing to Chigorin's line with White having played the extra move d3. Black often ends up playing ...g5 or ...g6.

=== 4...d5 ===
This is significantly less common than the other three options. It is a dynamic but risky line.

== Open Variation: 4.d4 exd4 ==
Position: a8 black rook, c8 black bishop, d8 black queen, e8 black king, f8 black bishop, h8 black rook, a7 black pawn, b7 black pawn, c7 black pawn, d7 black pawn, f7 black pawn, g7 black pawn, h7 black pawn, c6 black knight, f6 black knight, c4 white bishop, d4 black pawn, e4 white pawn, f3 white knight, a2 white pawn, b2 white pawn, c2 white pawn, f2 white pawn, g2 white pawn, h2 white pawn, a1 white rook, b1 white knight, c1 white bishop, d1 white queen, e1 white king, h1 white rook

Open Variation: 4.d4 exd4

White's move 4.d4 intends rapid development. After the usual response 4...exd4, this leads to a position also commonly reached via the Scotch Gambit (3.d4 exd4 4.Bc4). The transposition occurs with the most common response to the Scotch Gambit, 4...Nf6. White can respond with 5.e5 (the most common move), 5.0-0, or 5.Ng5.

=== Traditional line: 5.0-0 ===
After 5.0-0, Black is considered to equalize by eliminating White's last center pawn with 5...Nxe4, after which White usually plays 6.Re1, though 6.Nc3 (Nakhmanson Gambit) is a notable alternative. After 6.Re1, the usual continuation is 6...d5 7.Bxd5 Qxd5 8.Nc3, the Anderssen Attack. The most notable sideline is 6...d5 7.Nc3, the Canal Variation.

==== Anderssen Attack: 5...Nxe4 6.Re1 d5 7.Bxd5 Qxd5 8.Nc3 ====
Position: a8 black rook, c8 black bishop, e8 black king, f8 black bishop, h8 black rook, a7 black pawn, b7 black pawn, c7 black pawn, f7 black pawn, g7 black pawn, h7 black pawn, c6 black knight, d5 black queen, d4 black pawn, e4 black knight, c3 white knight, f3 white knight, a2 white pawn, b2 white pawn, c2 white pawn, f2 white pawn, g2 white pawn, h2 white pawn, a1 white rook, c1 white bishop, d1 white queen, e1 white rook, g1 white king

Anderssen Attack: 5.0-0 Nxe4 6.Re1 d5 7.Bxd5 Qxd5 8.Nc3

In this line, White will regain the material, but Black is judged as having a comfortable position after 8...Qa5 or 8...Qh5.

==== Nakhmanson Gambit: 5...Nxe4 6.Nc3 ====
Position: a8 black rook, c8 black bishop, d8 black queen, e8 black king, f8 black bishop, h8 black rook, a7 black pawn, b7 black pawn, c7 black pawn, d7 black pawn, f7 black pawn, g7 black pawn, h7 black pawn, c6 black knight, c4 white bishop, e4 black knight, c3 black pawn, f3 white knight, a2 white pawn, b2 white pawn, c2 white pawn, f2 white pawn, g2 white pawn, h2 white pawn, a1 white rook, c1 white bishop, d1 white queen, f1 white rook, g1 white king

Nakhmanson Gambit Accepted: 5.0-0 Nxe4 6.Nc3 dxc3

Position: a8 black rook, c8 black bishop, d8 black queen, e8 black king, f8 black bishop, h8 black rook, a7 black pawn, b7 black pawn, c7 black pawn, d7 black pawn, f7 black pawn, g7 black pawn, h7 black pawn, c6 black knight, c4 white bishop, d4 black pawn, c3 white pawn, f3 white knight, a2 white pawn, c2 white pawn, f2 white pawn, g2 white pawn, h2 white pawn, a1 white rook, c1 white bishop, d1 white queen, f1 white rook, g1 white king

Nakhmanson Gambit Declined: 5.0-0 Nxe4 6.Nc3 Nxc3 7.bxc3

If Black accepts the piece with 6...dxc3 and then after the usual continuation 7.Bxf7+ Kxf7 8.Qd5+ makes the intuitive move 8...Ke8?!, White is seen as receiving adequate compensation. Instead, 8...Kf6! has been analyzed to offer Black a substantial edge with best play.

A common alternative is to return the knight with 6...Nxc3 7.bxc3 d5 8.Bb5 Be7, leading to a better position for Black.

==== Max Lange Attack: 5...Bc5 6.e5 ====
Position: a8 black rook, c8 black bishop, d8 black queen, e8 black king, h8 black rook, a7 black pawn, b7 black pawn, c7 black pawn, f7 black pawn, g7 black pawn, h7 black pawn, c6 black knight, f6 black knight, c5 black bishop, d5 black pawn, e5 white pawn, c4 white bishop, d4 black pawn, f3 white knight, a2 white pawn, b2 white pawn, c2 white pawn, f2 white pawn, g2 white pawn, h2 white pawn, a1 white rook, b1 white knight, c1 white bishop, d1 white queen, f1 white rook, g1 white king

5.0-0 Bc5 6.e5 d5

Alternatively, Black can invite White to enter the extensively analyzed Max Lange Attack after 5...Bc5, with White accepting via the usual continuation 6.e5 d5. It can also arise by transposition from the Giuoco Piano or Scotch Gambit.

=== Advance Variation: 5.e5 ===
Position: a8 black rook, c8 black bishop, d8 black queen, e8 black king, f8 black bishop, h8 black rook, a7 black pawn, b7 black pawn, c7 black pawn, d7 black pawn, f7 black pawn, g7 black pawn, h7 black pawn, c6 black knight, f6 black knight, e5 white pawn, c4 white bishop, d4 black pawn, f3 white knight, a2 white pawn, b2 white pawn, c2 white pawn, f2 white pawn, g2 white pawn, h2 white pawn, a1 white rook, b1 white knight, c1 white bishop, d1 white queen, e1 white king, h1 white rook

Advance Variation: 5.e5

Position: a8 black rook, d8 black queen, e8 black king, h8 black rook, a7 black pawn, c7 black pawn, d7 black bishop, f7 black pawn, g7 black pawn, h7 black pawn, c6 black pawn, c5 black bishop, d5 black pawn, e5 white pawn, g5 black knight, d4 white knight, f3 white pawn, a2 white pawn, b2 white pawn, c2 white pawn, g2 white pawn, h2 white pawn, a1 white rook, b1 white knight, c1 white bishop, d1 white queen, f1 white rook, g1 white king

Main line: 5.e5 d5 6.Bb5 Ne4 7.Nxd4 Bd7 8.Bxc6 bxc6 9.0-0 Bc5 10.f3 Ng5

White can choose to avoid these lines by playing 5.e5, a line often adopted by Evgeny Sveshnikov, which has gradually become the main line of the Open Variation. After 5.e5, either 5...Ne4 or 5...Ng4 is a playable reply, but most common and natural is 5...d5 6.Bb5 Ne4 7.Nxd4 Bc5, with sharp play.

=== Perreux Variation: 5.Ng5 ===
Position: a8 black rook, c8 black bishop, d8 black queen, e8 black king, f8 black bishop, h8 black rook, a7 black pawn, b7 black pawn, c7 black pawn, d7 black pawn, f7 black pawn, g7 black pawn, h7 black pawn, c6 black knight, f6 black knight, g5 white knight, c4 white bishop, d4 black pawn, e4 white pawn, a2 white pawn, b2 white pawn, c2 white pawn, f2 white pawn, g2 white pawn, h2 white pawn, a1 white rook, b1 white knight, c1 white bishop, d1 white queen, e1 white king, h1 white rook

5.Ng5

The tricky 5.Ng5 is best met by 5...d5 6.exd5 Qe7+, where White will most often concede to playing 7.Kf1. Another option is 5...Ne5, with the typical continuations 6.Qxd4 Nxc4 7.Qxc4 d5 8.exd5 Qxd5 9.Qe2+ and 6.Bb3 h6 7.f4 hxg5 8.fxe5 Nxe4.

=== Other lines ===
- 5.0-0 Bc5 6.c3 (Mason Gambit)
- 5.0-0 d6 (Janowski Variation)
- 5.0-0 Be7 (de Rivière Variation)

== Four Knights Variation: 4.Nc3 ==
The attempt to defend the pawn with 4.Nc3 does not work well since Black can take the pawn anyway and use a fork trick to regain the piece, 4.Nc3?! Nxe4! 5.Nxe4 d5. The try 5.Bxf7+? does not help, as Black has the bishop pair and a better position after 5...Kxf7 6.Nxe4 d5. Instead, 4.Nc3 is usually played with the intent to gambit the e-pawn with the Boden–Kieseritzky Gambit, 4.Nc3 Nxe4 5.0-0. This gambit is not commonly seen in tournament play as it is not well regarded by opening theory, but it can offer White good practical chances, especially in blitz chess.

== Other lines ==
- After 4.d4, Black may also avoid the Scotch Gambit lines, such as with 4...d6, typically continuing with either 5.d5 or entering an endgame with 5.dxe5 dxe5 6.Qxd8+ Kxd8 7.Nxe5 Bd6, or 4...Nxe4?!, typically continuing 5.dxe5 Nc5 (or 5...d6). However, these are rare compared to 4...exd4.
- 4.0-0 is playable but leaves the e-pawn undefended. Black usually responds with 4...Nxe4.
- 4.Qe2 is occasionally seen. Black usually replies 4...Bc5 or 4...Be7.
- 4.c3?!, also allowing 4...Nxe4, transposes to a rarely seen gambit line in the Ponziani Opening.

=== References ===
- Bologan, Victor (2014). Bologan's Black Weapons in the Open Games. New in Chess. ISBN 978-9056915438.
- Bronstein, David (1991) [1973]. 200 Open Games. Dover Publications. ISBN 0-486-26857-8.
- de Firmian, Nick (1999). Modern Chess Openings: MCO-14. Random House Puzzles & Games. ISBN 0-8129-3084-3.
- Estrin, Yakov (1971). The Two Knights' Defence (English ed.). Chess Ltd.
- Harding, Tim (April 2001). "Two Knights Defence without Tears: Part Two" (PDF). The Kibitzer. chesscafe.com. Archived from the original (PDF) on 17 February 2012.
- Harding, Tim; Botterill, G. S. (1977). The Italian Game. B. T. Batsford Ltd. ISBN 0-7134-3261-6.
- Hooper, David; Whyld, Kenneth (1996) [First pub. 1992]. The Oxford Companion to Chess (2nd ed.). Oxford University Press. ISBN 0-19-280049-3.
- Kravtsiv, Martyn (2025). PCO: Practical Chess Openings. Gambit Publications. ISBN 9781805041047.
- New in Chess Yearbook 55. New in Chess. 2000. ISBN 90-5691-069-8.
- Nunn, John; Burgess, Graham; Emms, John; Gallagher, Joe (1999). Nunn's Chess Openings. Gambit Publications & Everyman Chess. ISBN 978-1857442212 – via Internet Archive.
- Pinkus, Albert S. (1943). "The Two Knights Defense". Chess Review. Vol. 11, no. 9, 10. pp. 350–51, 397–98 – via Internet Archive.
- Pinski, Jan (2004). The Two Knights Defence. Everyman Chess. ISBN 1-85744-283-0.
- Tait, Jonathan (2022). A Disreputable Opening Repertoire. Everyman Chess. ISBN 978-1781946060.
- Tarrasch, Siegbert (1935). The Game of Chess. Translated by Smith, G.E.; Bone, T.G. London: Chatto & Windus – via Internet Archive.
- Unzicker, Wolfgang (1975). Knaurs Neues Schachbuch für Anfänger und Fortgeschrittene. Droemer Knaur. ISBN 3-426-02242-7.
- Zagorovsky, Vladimir (1982). Romantic Chess Openings. Batsford Books. ISBN 0-7134-3623-9.
- Ulvestad, Olaf I. (January 1941). "A New Move in an Old Defense". Chess Review. pp. 7–8 – via Internet Archive.
