= Max Lange Attack =

Position: a8 black rook, c8 black bishop, d8 black queen, e8 black king, h8 black rook, a7 black pawn, b7 black pawn, c7 black pawn, d7 black pawn, f7 black pawn, g7 black pawn, h7 black pawn, c6 black knight, f6 black knight, c5 black bishop, e5 white pawn, c4 white bishop, d4 black pawn, f3 white knight, a2 white pawn, b2 white pawn, c2 white pawn, f2 white pawn, g2 white pawn, h2 white pawn, a1 white rook, b1 white knight, c1 white bishop, d1 white queen, f1 white rook, g1 white king
- Moves: 1.e4 e5 2.Nf3 Nc6 3.Bc4 Nf6 4.d4 exd4 5.0-0 Bc5 6.e5
- ECO: C55
- Origin: Mid-19th century
- Named after: Max Lange
- Parent: Two Knights Defense

The Max Lange Attack is a chess opening that can arise from several different opening lines, including the Two Knights Defense, Petroff's Defense, Scotch Gambit, Bishop's Opening, Center Game, and Giuoco Piano. Two of the most commonly seen move orders are 1.e4 e5 2.Nf3 Nc6 3.Bc4 Nf6 (the Two Knights Defense) 4.d4 exd4 5.0-0 Bc5 6.e5, and 1.e4 e5 2.Nf3 Nc6 3.d4 exd4 4.Bc4 (the Scotch Gambit) Bc5 5.0-0 Nf6 6.e5.

The opening is named for the German master Max Lange, who suggested it in 1854.

== Lines ==
After 6.e5, Black has two main replies. Black's 6...Ng4 is playable, but rarely seen. More common is 6...d5, when the main line continues 7.exf6 dxc4 8.Re1+ Be6 9.Ng5 Qd5 (9...Qxf6?? 10.Nxe6 fxe6 11.Qh5+ followed by 12.Qxc5 is a notorious trap) 10.Nc3 Qf5 (10...dxc3?? 11.Qxd5 wins, since 11...Bxd5 is illegal) 11.Nce4 0-0-0 with complex play. Another line for White to try, a critical response, is after 6...d5, White plays 7.Bb5 with strong ideas for both sides, usually resulting in a slight edge for White.

An alternative for White is 8.fxg7 Rg8 9.Bg5, analysed by Lev Gutman and Stefan Bücker in Kaissiber, which they consider to be good for White. Black's usual response is 9...Be7 10.Bxe7 Kxe7.

== Illustrative games ==
H. Vatter vs. John Nunn, 1986
1.e4 e5 2.Nf3 Nc6 3.Bc4 Nf6 4.d4 exd4 5.0-0 Bc5 6.e5 d5 7.exf6 dxc4 8.Re1+ Be6 9.Ng5 Qd5 10.Nc3 Qf5 11.Nce4 0-0-0 12.g4 Qe5 13.fxg7 Rhg8 14.Nxe6 fxe6 15.Bh6 d3 16.c3 d2 17.Re2 Rd3 18.Nxc5 Qxc5 19.Rxd2 Ne5 20.Rxd3 cxd3 21.Kg2 Qd5+ 22.Kg3 Qd6 23.Bf4 Rxg7 24.h3 Rf7 25.Qa4 Qc6 26.Qxc6 Nxc6 ½–½

== See also ==
- List of chess openings
- List of chess openings named after people
