= Rousseau Gambit =

Position: a8 black rook, c8 black bishop, d8 black queen, e8 black king, f8 black bishop, g8 black knight, h8 black rook, a7 black pawn, b7 black pawn, c7 black pawn, d7 black pawn, g7 black pawn, h7 black pawn, c6 black knight, e5 black pawn, f5 black pawn, c4 white bishop, e4 white pawn, f3 white knight, a2 white pawn, b2 white pawn, c2 white pawn, d2 white pawn, f2 white pawn, g2 white pawn, h2 white pawn, a1 white rook, b1 white knight, c1 white bishop, d1 white queen, e1 white king, h1 white rook
- Moves: 1.e4 e5 2.Nf3 Nc6 3.Bc4 f5
- ECO: C50
- Origin: 19th century
- Named after: Eugène Rousseau
- Parent: Italian Game
- Synonym: Ponziani Countergambit

The Rousseau Gambit (or Ponziani Countergambit after Domenico Lorenzo Ponziani) is a chess opening that begins with the moves:

1. e4 e5
2. Nf3 Nc6
3. Bc4 f5

The gambit is named after French chess master Eugène Rousseau. White can decline the gambit by supporting the e-pawn with 4.d3. The resulting position is similar to a King's Gambit Declined with colours reversed, and White's king bishop aiming at Black's weakened kingside. Black will have trouble castling kingside, and Ng5 is a likely threat. White's position is better, but still requires careful play.

Key themes for White are to attack Black's kingside and to avoid attempts by Black to simplify the position. Exchanges involving White's light-square bishop are particularly suspect.

== White responses ==
=== Gambit Declined: 4.d3 ===
White can decline the gambit and wait to capture the f-pawn. 4...Bc5 transposes to the Lucchini Gambit.

=== Gambit Accepted: 4.exf5 ===
White still has a good game after the inferior 4.exf5, but the position is less clear. Black usually plays 4...e4, which White may meet by 5.Nd4! Nf6 (5...Nxd4? leads to trouble after 6.Qh5+) 6.Nxc6.

=== 4.d4! ===
Position: a8 black rook, c8 black bishop, d8 black queen, e8 black king, f8 black bishop, g8 black knight, h8 black rook, a7 black pawn, b7 black pawn, c7 black pawn, d7 black pawn, g7 black pawn, h7 black pawn, c6 black knight, e5 black pawn, f5 black pawn, c4 white bishop, d4 white pawn, e4 white pawn, f3 white knight, a2 white pawn, b2 white pawn, c2 white pawn, f2 white pawn, g2 white pawn, h2 white pawn, a1 white rook, b1 white knight, c1 white bishop, d1 white queen, e1 white king, h1 white rook

After 4.d4!

White gets a clear advantage with 4.d4!:

- 4...fxe4 5.Nxe5 d5 6.Bb5 Ne7 7.0-0 a6 8.Bxc6+ bxc6 (8...Nxc6? 9.Qh5+) 9.f3 Bf5 10.Nc3 +/− (Bilguer Handbuch).
- 4...d6 and now:
  - 5.Ng5 Nh6 6.d5 Nb8 (6...Ne7 7.Nc3 f4 8.g3 Ng6 9.Bb5+ +/−; Maróczy) 7.Nc3 f4 8.h4 Bg4 9.f3 Bd7 10.g3 fxg3 11.f4 +/− (Sozin).
  - 5.dxe5 and now:
    - 5...fxe4 6.Qd5 Qe7 7.Bg5 Be6 8.Qxe4 +/− de Rivière–Anderssen, London 1862.
    - 5...dxe5 6.Qxd8+ Nxd8 (6...Kxd8 7.Bg5+ Nf6 8.Nc3 +/− Morphy–Worrall, London 1859) 7.Nxe5 fxe4 8.Bd2 Bd6 9.Bc3 +/− Löwenthal & Medley vs. Morphy & Mongredien, London 1857.
- 4...Nf6 5.dxe5 Nxe4 6.0-0 Bc5 7.Nc3 Nxc3 8.bxc3 h6 9.Nd4 g6 10.Nb3 +/− (Bilguer).

== See also ==
- Latvian Gambit
- List of chess openings
- List of chess openings named after people
