= Three Knights Game =

Chess opening

Position: a8 black rook, c8 black bishop, d8 black queen, e8 black king, f8 black bishop, g8 black knight, h8 black rook, a7 black pawn, b7 black pawn, c7 black pawn, d7 black pawn, f7 black pawn, g7 black pawn, h7 black pawn, c6 black knight, e5 black pawn, e4 white pawn, c3 white knight, f3 white knight, a2 white pawn, b2 white pawn, c2 white pawn, d2 white pawn, f2 white pawn, g2 white pawn, h2 white pawn, a1 white rook, c1 white bishop, d1 white queen, e1 white king, f1 white bishop, h1 white rook
- Moves: 1.e4 e5 2.Nf3 Nc6 3.Nc3
- ECO: C46
- Origin: Staunton vs. Cochrane, London 1841
- Parent: King's Knight Opening

The Three Knights Game is a chess opening which most commonly begins with the moves:

1. e4 e5
2. Nf3 Nc6
3. Nc3

In the Three Knights Game, Black chooses to break symmetry in order to avoid the main lines of what is often considered the drawish Four Knights Game after the usual 3...Nf6.

The relevant ECO code is C46.

== Black's third move ==
After tries such as 3...d6 or 3...Be7, White can play 4.d4, leaving Black with a cramped position resembling Philidor's Defense. If Black plays 3...Bc5 instead, White can eliminate Black's outpost at e5: 4.Nxe5! Nxe5 5.d4 Bd6 6.dxe5 Bxe5. Since tournament praxis shows the line seems to favor White, Black sometimes plays 3...Bb4 or 3...g6, the Steinitz Defense. Continuations then are typically 3...Bb4 4.Nd5 and 3...g6 4.d4 exd4 5.Nd5.

Another alternative for Black is 3...f5!?, the Winawer Defense (or Gothic Defense). Then 4.Bb5 transposes into the Schliemann Defense of the Ruy Lopez.

The Three Knights is almost never seen at master level nowadays, as Black players have sought more active tries, even within the Four Knights.

== Reversed knight position ==
The similar position with Black having moved ...Nf6 is called Petrov's Three Knights Game, although it too usually leads to the Four Knights Game.

== Example game ==
Rosenthal vs. Steinitz, 1873:
1.e4 e5 2.Nc3 Nc6 3.Nf3 g6 4.d4 exd4 5.Nxd4 Bg7 6.Be3 Nge7 7.Bc4 d6 8.0-0 0-0 9.f4 Na5 10.Bd3 d5 11.exd5 Nxd5 12.Nxd5 Qxd5 13.c3 Rd8 14.Qc2 Nc4 15.Bxc4 Qxc4 16.Qf2 c5 17.Nf3 b6 18.Ne5 Qe6 19.Qf3 Ba6 20.Rfe1 f6 21.Ng4 h5 22.Nf2 Qf7 23.f5 g5 24.Rad1 Bb7 25.Qg3 Rd5 26.Rxd5 Qxd5 27.Rd1 Qxf5 28.Qc7 Bd5 29.b3 Re8 30.c4 Bf7 31.Bc1 Re2 32.Rf1 Qc2 33.Qg3 Qxa2 34.Qb8+ Kh7 35.Qg3 Bg6 36.h4 g4 37.Nd3 Qxb3 38.Qc7 Qxd3 0–1

== See also ==
- Open Game
