= Fried Liver Attack =

Position: a8 black rook, c8 black bishop, d8 black queen, e8 black king, f8 black bishop, h8 black rook, a7 black pawn, b7 black pawn, c7 black pawn, f7 white knight, g7 black pawn, h7 black pawn, c6 black knight, d5 black knight, e5 black pawn, c4 white bishop, a2 white pawn, b2 white pawn, c2 white pawn, d2 white pawn, f2 white pawn, g2 white pawn, h2 white pawn, a1 white rook, b1 white knight, c1 white bishop, d1 white queen, e1 white king, h1 white rook
- Moves: 1.e4 e5 2.Nf3 Nc6 3.Bc4 Nf6 4.Ng5 d5 5.exd5 Nxd5 6.Nxf7
- ECO: C57
- Origin: Polerio vs. Domenico, Rome c. 1610
- Named after: Italian dish ("Fegatelli" is pork liver sliced up, wrapped in fat netting and cooked over a fire; likewise Black's king is wrapped in White's mating net.)
- Parent: Two Knights Defense
- Synonym: Fegatello Attack

The Fried Liver Attack, also called the Fegatello Attack (named after an Italian dish), is a chess opening variation of the Two Knights Defense in which White sacrifices a knight for an attack on Black's king. The opening begins with the moves:

1. e4 e5
2. Nf3 Nc6
3. Bc4 Nf6
4. Ng5 d5
5. exd5 Nxd5?!
6. Nxf7

White's move 4.Ng5 is an aggressive attacking line against the Two Knights. Black's move 5...Nxd5?! is risky (5...Na5 is generally considered best). Bobby Fischer felt that 6.d4! (the Lolli Attack) was incredibly strong, to the point 5...Nxd5 is rarely played. It is classified as code C57 in the Encyclopaedia of Chess Openings.

== History ==
The Fried Liver Attack has been known for many centuries, the earliest known example being a game played by Giulio Cesare Polerio before 1606.

== Considerations ==
Position: a8 black rook, c8 black bishop, d8 black queen, f8 black bishop, h8 black rook, a7 black pawn, b7 black pawn, c7 black pawn, g7 black pawn, h7 black pawn, c6 black knight, e6 black king, d5 black knight, e5 black pawn, c4 white bishop, c3 white knight, f3 white queen, a2 white pawn, b2 white pawn, c2 white pawn, d2 white pawn, f2 white pawn, g2 white pawn, h2 white pawn, a1 white rook, c1 white bishop, e1 white king, h1 white rook

Position after 8.Nc3

After 6...Kxf7, play usually continues 7.Qf3+ Ke6 (7...Kg8?? leads to a mate in 3 after 8.Bxd5+ while other moves immediately lose the knight on d5) 8.Nc3 (diagram). Black will play 8...Nb4 and follow up with ...c6, bolstering their pinned knight on d5. White can force the b4-knight to abandon protection of the d5-knight with 9.a3, a move Yakov Estrin recommended, but Black is quite strong after 9.a3 Nxc2+ 10.Kd1 Nd4!? or 10...Nxa1! 11.Nxd5 Qh4! when White's attack runs out (12.Nxc7+ Kd7 13.Qf7+ Qe7 and the queens come off; after 12.Nb6+ Ke7, 13.Nxc8+ is met by 13...Rxc8 14.d3 Kd8, and 13.Qf7+ is met by 13...Kd8 14.Nxa8 Bd7; either way, Black's king is safe and Black has the advantage). Thus, 9.Bb3, 9.Qe4, or 9.0-0 are better choices.

White has a strong attack, but it has not yet been proven to be decisive. Because defence is harder to play than attack in this variation, the Fried Liver is dangerous for Black, particularly with shorter time controls.
