= Kieseritzky =

Kieseritzy is the surname of several people:

- Gustav Kieseritzky (1893–1943), highly decorated Vizeadmiral in the German Kriegsmarine during World War II
- Lionel Kieseritzky (1806–1853), Baltic-German chess master and writer
- R.K. Kieseritzky (c. 1870 – after 1923), Russian chess master

Also

- Boden-Kieseritzky Gambit, chess opening named for Samuel Standridge Boden and Lionel Kieseritzky
- Kieseritzky Gambit, chess opening named for Lionel Kieseritzky
