= Bishop's Opening =

Position: a8 black rook, b8 black knight, c8 black bishop, d8 black queen, e8 black king, f8 black bishop, g8 black knight, h8 black rook, a7 black pawn, b7 black pawn, c7 black pawn, d7 black pawn, f7 black pawn, g7 black pawn, h7 black pawn, e5 black pawn, c4 white bishop, e4 white pawn, a2 white pawn, b2 white pawn, c2 white pawn, d2 white pawn, f2 white pawn, g2 white pawn, h2 white pawn, a1 white rook, b1 white knight, c1 white bishop, d1 white queen, e1 white king, g1 white knight, h1 white rook
- Moves: 1.e4 e5 2.Bc4
- ECO: C23–C24
- Named after: Bishop in 2.Bc4
- Parent: Open Game

The Bishop's Opening is a chess opening that begins with the moves:

1. e4 e5
2. Bc4

White attacks Black's f7-square and prevents Black from advancing the d-pawn to d5. Black's most common reply is 2...Nf6, followed by 2...Nc6 and 2...Bc5. By ignoring the beginner's maxim "develop knights before bishops", White leaves the f-pawn unblocked, preserving the possibility of an f2–f4 push. This gives the Bishop's Opening an affinity with the King's Gambit and the Vienna Game, two openings that share this characteristic. The Bishop's Opening can transpose into either of these openings. Transpositions into the Giuoco Piano and the Two Knights Defense and other openings are also possible.

The Encyclopaedia of Chess Openings assigns the Bishop's Opening the codes C23 and C24.

== History ==
The Bishop's Opening is one of the oldest openings to be analyzed; it was studied by Lucena and Ruy Lopez. Later it was played by Philidor, whose influence gave the opening long-lasting popularity. (Note: "As a matter of fact, the proper name for the Bishop's Opening would be Philidor's Opening; for although it was examined in the Göttingen manuscript, as well as by Lucena and Lopez, it was Philidor who built the theoretical foundation of the Bishop's Opening.") The opening fell out of favor after improvements for Black were introduced in the mid-19th century. (Note: "Bledow and the Berlin Pleiades of masters worked out the so-called 'Berlin Defense': 2...Nf6, which neutralized f2–f4 in view of the counterstroke ...d7–d5.")

Bent Larsen was one of the few grandmasters to play it often, after first using it at the 1964 Interzonal tournament. Though the Bishop's Opening is uncommon today, it has been used occasionally as a surprise by players such as Garry Kasparov. John Nunn uses it to avoid Petrov's Defense (1.e4 e5 2.Nf3 Nf6), and Peter Lékó played it in the 2007 World Championship against Vladimir Kramnik, known to consistently play the Petrov.

Weaver Adams in his classic work White to Play and Win claimed that the Bishop's Opening was a win for White by force from the second move. He was unable to prove this by defeating players stronger than himself, however, and later abandoned the Bishop's Opening for the Vienna Game, making the same claim. Grandmaster Nick de Firmian, in the 14th edition of Modern Chess Openings, concludes that the Bishop's Opening leads to equality with best play by both sides, and notes that, "Among modern players only Bent Larsen has played it much, but even Kasparov gave it a whirl (winning against Bareev)."

== Variations ==
The opening is rich in transpositional possibilities to other openings, but also has many independent lines. Lines also frequently reached from other openings, such as the Vienna Game, are often regarded as transpositions, including by ECO, but may also be assigned to the Bishop's Opening instead.

Because of this, the opening can be used as a transpositional device. White sometimes chooses the Bishop's Opening move order with the goal of transposing into the Giuoco Piano while preventing Black from playing Petrov's Defense. For example, 2...Nf6 3.d3 Nc6 4.Nf3 Bc5 reaches the quiet Giuoco Pianissimo. Black can decline this, however, by playing 3...c6 instead.

Examined in this article are the following common variations:

- 2...Nf6 (Berlin Defense)
  - 3.d3 (main line)
    - 3...c6 (Paulsen Defense)
    - 3...Nc6 4.Nc3 (Vienna Hybrid Variation)
    - 3...Nc6 4.Nf3 (Two Knights Defense, Closed Variation, by transposition, also "Modern Bishop's Opening")
    - 3...Bc5 4.Nc3 (Spielmann Attack)
    - 3...Bc5 4.Nf3 Nc6 (Giuoco Pianissimo, by transposition)
  - 3.Nc3 (Vienna Game, Stanley Variation, by transposition)
  - 3.d4 (Ponziani Gambit)
    - 3...exd4 4.Nf3 (Urusov Gambit)
    - 3...exd4 4.Qxd4 Nc6 (Center Game, by transposition)
  - 3.Nf3 (Petrov's Defence, by transposition)
    - 3...Nxe4 4.Nc3 Nxc3 (Boden–Kieseritzky Gambit)
    - 3...Nxe4 4.Nc3 Nc6 (Four Knights Game, Italian Variation, by transposition)
    - 3...Nc6 (Two Knights Defense, by transposition)
  - 3.f4 (Greco Gambit)
    - 3...exf4 (Bishop's Gambit, by transposition)
    - 3...Nxe4
    - 3...d5
  - 3.Qe2
- 2...Bc5 (Classical Variation)
  - 3.Nf3 Nc6 (Giuoco Piano, by transposition)
  - 3.Nc3 Nf6 (Vienna Game, Falkbeer Variation, by transposition)
  - 3.Nc3 Nc6 (Vienna Game, Symmetrical Variation, by transposition)
  - 3.d3 Nf6 (Berlin Defense, by transposition)
  - 3.c3 (Philidor Variation)
    - 3...d5 (Lewis Countergambit)
  - 3.b4 (McDonnell (Wing) Gambit)
  - 3.d4 (Lewis Gambit)
  - 3.f4 (Stein Gambit)
  - 3.Qe2 (Lopez Variation)
  - 3.Qh5 (Scholar's mate attempt)
- 2...Nc6
  - 3.Nf3 (Italian Game, by transposition)
  - 3.Nc3 (Vienna Game, by transposition)
- 2...d6 3.Nf3 (Philidor Defense, by transposition)
- 2...c6 (Philidor Counterattack)
- 2...f5 (Calabrese Countergambit)
- 2...b5 (Anderssen Gambit and Thorold Gambit)

== Berlin Defense: 2...Nf6 ==
Black's most active second move is 2...Nf6, forcing White to decide how to defend the pawn on e4. The usual method is 3.d3. Black must be careful about later ideas of f4 (a delayed King's Gambit) from White. Following 3.d3, Black's most common replies are 3...c6, the Paulsen Defense, and 3...Nc6. 3...Bc5 is also common and often transposes to the Giuoco Piano after a later ...Nc6. Transposition to the Two Knights is also common after the occasionally seen 3...Be7 and 3...d5.

White may also avoid playing d3. The most common alternative is 3.Nc3, which leads a position also commonly reached from the Vienna Game. Other possibilities include 3.d4, usually intending the Urusov Gambit, and 3.Nf3, usually intending the Boden–Kieseritzky Gambit.

=== Paulsen Defense: 3.d3 c6 ===
Position: a8 black rook, b8 black knight, c8 black bishop, d8 black queen, e8 black king, f8 black bishop, h8 black rook, a7 black pawn, b7 black pawn, f7 black pawn, g7 black pawn, h7 black pawn, c6 black pawn, f6 black knight, d5 black pawn, e5 black pawn, e4 white pawn, b3 white bishop, d3 white pawn, f3 white knight, a2 white pawn, b2 white pawn, c2 white pawn, f2 white pawn, g2 white pawn, h2 white pawn, a1 white rook, b1 white knight, c1 white bishop, d1 white queen, e1 white king, h1 white rook

Paulsen Defense, main line: 2.Bc4 Nf6 3.d3 c6 4.Nf3 d5 5.Bb3

The most well-regarded response is 3...c6, the Paulsen Defense, intending to establish a strong center and win a tempo on White's bishop. It usually continues 4.Nf3 d5 5.Bb3, and then most often 5...Bd6. White will attempt to undermine the center that Black has been allowed to construct.

The Paulsen Defense is the most commonly played independent line (being reachable from neither the Italian Game nor Vienna Game) of the opening. For this reason, some Black players not used to the Bishop's Opening may choose 2...Nc6 or 3...Nc6 in order to transpose to more familiar lines.

=== Vienna Hybrid Variation: 3.d3 Nc6 4.Nc3 ===
Position: a8 black rook, c8 black bishop, d8 black queen, e8 black king, f8 black bishop, h8 black rook, a7 black pawn, b7 black pawn, c7 black pawn, d7 black pawn, f7 black pawn, g7 black pawn, h7 black pawn, f6 black knight, a5 black knight, e5 black pawn, c4 white bishop, e4 white pawn, c3 white knight, d3 white pawn, a2 white pawn, b2 white pawn, c2 white pawn, f2 white pawn, g2 white pawn, h2 white pawn, a1 white rook, c1 white bishop, d1 white queen, e1 white king, g1 white knight, h1 white rook

Position after 2.Bc4 Nf6 3.d3 Nc6 4.Nc3 Na5

After 3...Nc6, the game usually transposes to either the Closed Variation of the Two Knights Defense (2.Nf3 Nc6 3.Bc4 Nf6 4.d3), also known as the Modern Bishop's Opening, after 4.Nf3, or reaches the Vienna Hybrid Variation after 4.Nc3, a line that can also be reached by multiple move orders from the Vienna Game, hence its name: 2.Nc3 Nc6 3.Bc4 Nf6 4.d3 and 2.Nc3 Nf6 3.Bc4 Nc6 4.d3 both lead to the same position.

Black's most common reply at the master level is 4...Na5, intending 5...Nxc4 (or 5.Bb3 Nxb3), acquiring the bishop pair. Black may also opt to instead simply develop a new piece, most often with 4...Bb4, 4...Bc5 (in which case 5.f4 is common in reply, transposing to the King's Gambit Declined), or occasionally 4...Be7.

=== Urusov Gambit: 3.d4 exd4 4.Nf3 ===
Position: a8 black rook, b8 black knight, c8 black bishop, d8 black queen, e8 black king, f8 black bishop, h8 black rook, a7 black pawn, b7 black pawn, c7 black pawn, d7 black pawn, f7 black pawn, g7 black pawn, h7 black pawn, f6 black knight, e5 black pawn, c4 white bishop, d4 white pawn, e4 white pawn, a2 white pawn, b2 white pawn, c2 white pawn, f2 white pawn, g2 white pawn, h2 white pawn, a1 white rook, b1 white knight, c1 white bishop, d1 white queen, e1 white king, g1 white knight, h1 white rook

Urusov Gambit: 3.d4

The Urusov Gambit is named after Russian Prince Sergey Semyonovich Urusov (1827–1897). After 2...Nf6 3.d4 exd4 (3...Nxe4 4.dxe5 gives White some advantage) 4.Nf3, Black can transpose to the Two Knights Defense with 4...Nc6, or can decline the gambit with 4...d5 5.exd5 Bb4+ 6.c3 (6.Kf1 is recommended by Michael Goeller, winning a pawn at the expense of castling rights) 6...Qe7+ 7.Be2 dxc3, when 8.bxc3 and 8.Nxc3 both offer approximately equal chances.

Black can accept the gambit with 4...Nxe4 5.Qxd4 Nf6 (5...Nd6? 6.0-0 gives White an overwhelming attack), and White will continue with Nc3, Bg5, Qh4, 0-0-0, and usually intends to meet ...0-0 and ...h6 with the piece sacrifice Bxh6, exposing the black king. Black has a solid position with no clear weaknesses, but White has attacking chances and piece activity as compensation for the pawn.

The Urusov Gambit is also occasionally reached via Petrov's Defense after 1.e4 e5 2.Nf3 Nf6 3.d4 exd4 4.Bc4. The Max Lange Attack can also be reached from the position after 4...Bc5 5.0-0 Nc6.

=== Boden–Kieseritzky Gambit: 3.Nf3 Nxe4 4.Nc3 ===
Position: a8 black rook, b8 black knight, c8 black bishop, d8 black queen, e8 black king, f8 black bishop, h8 black rook, a7 black pawn, b7 black pawn, c7 black pawn, d7 black pawn, f7 black pawn, g7 black pawn, h7 black pawn, e5 black pawn, c4 white bishop, e4 black knight, c3 white knight, f3 white knight, a2 white pawn, b2 white pawn, c2 white pawn, d2 white pawn, f2 white pawn, g2 white pawn, h2 white pawn, a1 white rook, c1 white bishop, d1 white queen, e1 white king, h1 white rook

Boden–Kieseritzky Gambit: 3.Nf3 Nxe4 4.Nc3

The Boden–Kieseritzky Gambit is named after English players and chess writers Samuel Boden and Lionel Kieseritzky. Boden published the first analysis of it in 1851. Opening theoreticians consider that after 2...Nf6 3.Nf3 Nxe4 4.Nc3 Nxc3 5.dxc3 f6, White's attack is not quite worth a pawn. The game may continue 6.0-0 Nc6 (not 6...Be7? 7.Nxe5! with a tremendous attack, but 6...d6 is also playable) 7.Nh4 g6 8.f4 f5 9.Nf3 (9.Nxf5? d5!) e4 10.Ng5 (10.Ne5 Qe7! threatening Qc5+ is strong) Bc5+. In practice, Black's lack of development and inability to castle kingside can prove very problematic.

Safer for Black are Paul Morphy's solid 5...c6 6.Nxe5 d5, returning the pawn with equality, and 4...Nc6!? (instead of 4...Nxc3) 5.0-0 (5.Nxe4 d5) Nxc3 6.dxc3 Qe7! when, according to Bobby Fischer in My 60 Memorable Games, "White has no compensation for the pawn."

The gambit can also occur via other move orders, such as 2.Nc3 (Vienna Game) Nf6 3.Bc4 Nxe4 4.Nf3 and 2.Nf3 Nf6 (Petrov's Defense) 3.Bc4 Nxe4 4.Nc3. Black can also decline the pawn with 3...Nc6, transposing into the Two Knights Defense.

=== Other lines ===
- A rarely seen gambit is 3.f4, which typically continues 3...Nxe4 4.d3 Nd6 5.Bb3 Nc6 (or 5...e4); 3...exf4, transposing to the Bishop's Gambit; or 3...d5 4.exd5 e4!, a line of the Falkbeer Countergambit favorable to Black.
- 4.Qe2 and 4.Qf3 are rarely seen but still occur.

== Classical Variation: 2...Bc5 ==
Position: a8 black rook, b8 black knight, c8 black bishop, d8 black queen, e8 black king, g8 black knight, h8 black rook, a7 black pawn, b7 black pawn, c7 black pawn, d7 black pawn, f7 black pawn, g7 black pawn, h7 black pawn, c5 black bishop, e5 black pawn, c4 white bishop, e4 white pawn, c3 white pawn, a2 white pawn, b2 white pawn, d2 white pawn, f2 white pawn, g2 white pawn, h2 white pawn, a1 white rook, b1 white knight, c1 white bishop, d1 white queen, e1 white king, g1 white knight, h1 white rook

Philidor Variation: 3.c3

Position: a8 black rook, b8 black knight, c8 black bishop, d8 black queen, e8 black king, g8 black knight, h8 black rook, a7 black pawn, b7 black pawn, c7 black pawn, d7 black pawn, f7 black pawn, g7 black pawn, h7 black pawn, c5 black bishop, e5 black pawn, b4 white pawn, c4 white bishop, e4 white pawn, a2 white pawn, c2 white pawn, d2 white pawn, f2 white pawn, g2 white pawn, h2 white pawn, a1 white rook, b1 white knight, c1 white bishop, d1 white queen, e1 white king, g1 white knight, h1 white rook

Wing Gambit: 3.b4

The Classical Variation (also known as the Boi Variation) is Black's symmetrical response, 2...Bc5. White can then transpose into the Vienna Game (3.Nc3) or the Giuoco Piano (3.Nf3 Nc6), or remain in the Bishop's Opening, such as with the Philidor Variation (3.c3). Transpositions into the King's Gambit Declined and the Giuoco Pianissimo are also possible after 3.d3.

=== Philidor Variation: 3.c3 ===
The main line of the Philidor Variation runs 3.c3 Nf6 4.d4 exd4 5.e5 d5! 6.exf6 dxc4 7.Qh5 0-0 8.Qxc5 Re8+ 9.Ne2 d3 10.Be3.

Black's most energetic response to the Philidor Variation is the Lewis Countergambit, 3.c3 d5, named for the English player and author William Lewis (1787–1870) who published analysis of the line in 1834.

=== Other lines ===
- 3.b4, the Wing Gambit, results in positions similar to those in the Evans Gambit. It often transposes into the Evans Gambit, for instance by 3.b4 Bxb4 4.c3 Ba5 5.Nf3 Nc6. It can also lead to the Four Pawns Gambit after 3...Bxb4 4.f4 exf4 5.Nf3 Be7 6.d4 Bh4+ 7.g3 fxg3 8.0-0 gxh2+ 9.Kh1.
- 3.Qf3 and 3.Qh5 are also popular among lower-level players, threatening an immediate Scholar's mate. But the threat is easily met (e.g. 3.Qh5 Qe7) and the moves are considered inferior since they hamper White's development or leave the queen exposed, leading to loss of tempo.

== Black's second-move alternatives ==
Position: a8 black rook, b8 black knight, c8 black bishop, d8 black queen, e8 black king, f8 black bishop, g8 black knight, h8 black rook, a7 black pawn, b7 black pawn, d7 black pawn, f7 black pawn, g7 black pawn, h7 black pawn, c6 black pawn, e5 black pawn, c4 white bishop, e4 white pawn, a2 white pawn, b2 white pawn, c2 white pawn, d2 white pawn, f2 white pawn, g2 white pawn, h2 white pawn, a1 white rook, b1 white knight, c1 white bishop, d1 white queen, e1 white king, g1 white knight, h1 white rook

Philidor Counterattack: 2...c6
- 2...Nc6 is also common and most often transposes to the Italian Game after 3.Nf3 or the Vienna Game after 3.Nc3 (or these may occur on the fourth move after 3.d3).
- 2...c6, the Philidor Counterattack, is playable but rarely seen, as delaying ...c6 until the third move via 2...Nf6 3.d3 c6, the Paulsen Defense, seems to perform better for Black.
- 2...Be7?, attempting to transpose into the Hungarian Defense, loses a pawn after 3.Qh5.
- The Calabrese Countergambit (2...f5?!) is named after Greco's homeland, Calabria. It is considered dubious, as the line recommended by Carl Jaenisch, 3.d3 Nf6 4.f4 d6 5.Nf3, gives White the advantage. Other analyses, however, have found that the sharp 3.f4! or safe 3.Nc3 are better for White than 3.d3.
