= Bishop's Gambit (disambiguation) =

Bishop's Gambit is a move in chess. It may also refer to:

- "Bishop's Gambit" (Legends of Tomorrow), an episode of Legends of Tomorrow
- "Bishop's Gambit" (Teenage Mutant Ninja Turtles), an episode of Teenage Mutant Ninja Turtles
- "The Bishop's Gambit", an episode of Yes, Prime Minister
