= Falkbeer Countergambit =

Position: a8 black rook, b8 black knight, c8 black bishop, d8 black queen, e8 black king, f8 black bishop, g8 black knight, h8 black rook, a7 black pawn, b7 black pawn, c7 black pawn, f7 black pawn, g7 black pawn, h7 black pawn, d5 black pawn, e5 black pawn, e4 white pawn, f4 white pawn, a2 white pawn, b2 white pawn, c2 white pawn, d2 white pawn, g2 white pawn, h2 white pawn, a1 white rook, b1 white knight, c1 white bishop, d1 white queen, e1 white king, f1 white bishop, g1 white knight, h1 white rook
- Moves: 1.e4 e5 2.f4 d5
- ECO: C31–C32
- Named after: Ernst Falkbeer
- Parent: King's Gambit

The Falkbeer Countergambit is a chess opening that begins with the moves:

1. e4 e5
2. f4 d5

It is a common response to the King's Gambit. In this countergambit, Black rejects the pawn offered as a sacrifice, instead opening the center to enable quick development, aiming to exploit White's weakness on the kingside. After the standard capture, 3.exd5, Black may reply with 3...exf4, transposing into the King's Gambit Accepted, 3...e4, or the more modern 3...c6.

A well-known blunder in this opening is White's reply 3.fxe5??, which after 3...Qh4+, loses a rook for nothing (4.g3 Qxe4+) or a queen for a bishop (4.Ke2 Qxe4+ 5.Kf2 Bc5+ 6.d4 Bxd4+ and White must play 7.Qxd4 to avoid a forced checkmate).

The opening bears the name of Austrian master Ernst Falkbeer who played it in an 1851 game against Adolf Anderssen. The Encyclopaedia of Chess Openings codes for the Falkbeer Countergambit are C31 and C32.

== Old main line: 3.exd5 e4 ==
Position: a8 black rook, b8 black knight, c8 black bishop, d8 black queen, e8 black king, f8 black bishop, g8 black knight, h8 black rook, a7 black pawn, b7 black pawn, c7 black pawn, f7 black pawn, g7 black pawn, h7 black pawn, d5 white pawn, e4 black pawn, f4 white pawn, d3 white pawn, a2 white pawn, b2 white pawn, c2 white pawn, g2 white pawn, h2 white pawn, a1 white rook, b1 white knight, c1 white bishop, d1 white queen, e1 white king, f1 white bishop, g1 white knight, h1 white rook

Position after 3.exd5 e4 4.d3

In this variation, Black's compensation for the sacrificed pawn primarily consists of his lead in development, coupled with the exposure of White's king. A typical line may run: 4.d3 Nf6 5.dxe4 Nxe4 6.Nf3 Bc5, where Black aims for the weakness on f2. In Maehrisch-Ostrau 1923, a game between Rudolf Spielmann and Siegbert Tarrasch continued: 7.Qe2 Bf5 (this was condemned by the Handbuch des Schachspiels because of White's next, though Black had already gotten into difficulties in the game Réti–Breyer, Budapest 1917, where 7...f5 8.Nfd2 Bf2+ 9.Kd1 Qxd5 10.Nc3 was played) 8.g4?! (in retrospect, prudent was 8.Nc3) 8...0-0! 9.gxf5 Re8 and Black has a tremendous position, as he is bound to regain material and White's positional deficiencies will remain.

This line fell out of favor after World War II, as new resources for White were discovered, with players eventually turning to the next idea, but the line still sees some play.

Common lines other than the main line (4.d3) include the Rubinstein Variation (4.Nc3 Nf6 5.Qe2) and the Nimzowitsch Variation (4.Bb5+). The line 4.d3 Nf6 5.Nc3 Bb4 6.Bd2 e3 is known as the Morphy Gambit.

== Nimzowitsch–Marshall Countergambit: 3.exd5 c6 ==
Position: a8 black rook, b8 black knight, c8 black bishop, d8 black queen, e8 black king, f8 black bishop, g8 black knight, h8 black rook, a7 black pawn, b7 black pawn, f7 black pawn, g7 black pawn, h7 black pawn, c6 black pawn, d5 white pawn, e5 black pawn, f4 white pawn, a2 white pawn, b2 white pawn, c2 white pawn, d2 white pawn, g2 white pawn, h2 white pawn, a1 white rook, b1 white knight, c1 white bishop, d1 white queen, e1 white king, f1 white bishop, g1 white knight, h1 white rook

After 3.exd5 c6

This has become the most commonly played move after 3.exd5, with its most notable advocate being John Nunn. It is usually attributed to Aron Nimzowitsch, who successfully played it in Spielmann–Nimzowitsch, Munich 1906. However, Frank Marshall actually introduced the move to master play, defeating Richard Teichmann in 34 moves at Ostend 1905. Annotating that game in his 1914 book Marshall's Chess "Swindles", Marshall described his 3...c6 as "An innovation."

Although Black won both of those games, 3...c6 languished in obscurity for many years thereafter. White can respond with 4.Qe2, despite the drastic defeat inflicted on the young Alexander Alekhine by Paul Johner at Carlsbad 1911, although 4.Nc3 exf4 is much more common. The resulting positions are analogous to the Modern Defense of the KGA, in which White plans to attack using a 4–2 queenside pawn majority, with Black relying on piece activity and the cramping pawn on f4 to play against White's king. Theory has not reached a definitive verdict, but the resulting positions are believed to offer Black more chances than 3...e4.

== Other lines ==
- 3.exd5 exf4 4.Nf3 transposes to the Modern Defense. 4.Bc4 is also possible, transposing to the Bishop's Gambit.
- 3.Nf3 is the Blackburne Attack, the second most common move for White. It is considered sound.
- 3.Nc3 is the Milner-Barry Variation.
- 3.d4 is the Hinrichsen Gambit.

== See also ==
- List of chess openings
- List of chess openings named after people
