= King's Gambit, McDonnell Gambit =

McDonnell Gambit
Position: a8 black rook, b8 black knight, c8 black bishop, d8 black queen, e8 black king, f8 black bishop, g8 black knight, h8 black rook, a7 black pawn, b7 black pawn, c7 black pawn, d7 black pawn, f7 black pawn, h7 black pawn, c4 white bishop, e4 white pawn, f4 black pawn, g4 black pawn, c3 white knight, f3 white knight, a2 white pawn, b2 white pawn, c2 white pawn, d2 white pawn, g2 white pawn, h2 white pawn, a1 white rook, c1 white bishop, d1 white queen, e1 white king, h1 white rook
- Moves: 1.e4 e5 2.f4 exf4 3.Nf3 g5 4.Bc4 g4 5.Nc3
- ECO: C37
- Origin: McDonnell vs. La Bourdonnais, London 1834, match 3, game 1
- Named after: Alexander McDonnell
- Parent: King's Gambit

The McDonnell Gambit is a chess opening gambit in the King's Gambit, Classical Variation, that begins with the moves:

1. e4 e5
2. f4 exf4
3. Nf3 g5
4. Bc4 g4
5. Nc3

It can also be reached via the Quaade Gambit:

4. Nc3 g4
5. Bc4

The opening is named after Alexander McDonnell, a 19th-century Irish chess master, who successfully introduced it in his third match with Louis-Charles Mahé de La Bourdonnais. The aim is to gain a significant lead in development (knight, bishop, and queen) for the sacrificed knight, followed by a kingside attack.

The McDonnell Gambit has always been much less popular for White than the similarly motivated Muzio Gambit (4.Bc4 g4 5.0-0). Although considered obsolete by MCO, it has not been refuted. It should not be confused with the McDonnell Attack, found in the Bishop's Gambit (3.Bc4).

== 5...gxf3 ==
After 5... gxf3 6. Qxf3 is usual, though the wild 6.0-0 is occasionally seen. Now 6...Bh6 (as in the McDonnell–La Bourdonnais game below) is regarded as inferior. Better options for Black are:

- 6... d5 7.Nxd5 Nc6 led to approximate equality in Charousek & Fahndrich – Halprin & Marco, Vienna 1897 after 8.0-0 Bd6 9.d4 Nxd5 10.Qh5 Be6 11.Bxf4 Bxf4 12.Nxf4 Bxc4 13.Qe5+ Kf8 14.Qxh8 Bxf1 15.Rxf1 Qf6 16.Qxh7 Qxf4.
- 6... d6 7.0-0 Be6 8.Nd5 c6 9.Qc3 cxd5 10.Qxh8 dxc4 11.Qxg8 Qb6+ 12.Kh1 Nc6 13.b3 Qd4 and Black is better (analysis by J. Malkin, Wiener Schachzeitung 1911).

=== McDonnell vs. La Bourdonnais, London 1834 ===
1. e4 e5 2. f4 exf4 3. Nf3 g5 4. Bc4 g4 5. Nc3 gxf3 6. Qxf3 Bh6 7. d4 Nc6 8. 0-0!

Continuing his policy of development over material.

8... Nxd4? 9. Bxf7+!

Position: a8 black rook, c8 black bishop, d8 black queen, e8 black king, g8 black knight, h8 black rook, a7 black pawn, b7 black pawn, c7 black pawn, d7 black pawn, f7 white bishop, h7 black pawn, h6 black bishop, d4 black knight, e4 white pawn, f4 black pawn, c3 white knight, f3 white queen, a2 white pawn, b2 white pawn, c2 white pawn, g2 white pawn, h2 white pawn, a1 white rook, c1 white bishop, f1 white rook, g1 white king

Position after 9.Bxf7!

A frequently seen move in the King's Gambit as it strips away a key defensive pawn.

9... Kxf7 10. Qh5+ Kg7 11. Bxf4 Bxf4 12. Rxf4 Nf6 13. Qg5+ Kf7 14. Raf1

Position: a8 black rook, c8 black bishop, d8 black queen, h8 black rook, a7 black pawn, b7 black pawn, c7 black pawn, d7 black pawn, f7 black king, h7 black pawn, f6 black knight, g5 white queen, d4 black knight, e4 white pawn, f4 white rook, c3 white knight, a2 white pawn, b2 white pawn, c2 white pawn, g2 white pawn, h2 white pawn, f1 white rook, g1 white king

Position after 14.Raf1

McDonnell has built up a winning attack almost effortlessly.

14... Ke8 15. Rxf6 Qe7

Looking for some counterplay with his queen and at the same time freeing a square for his king.

16. Nd5! Qc5

One last try; if McDonnell is inattentive he could miss the discovered check 17...Nf3+! followed by 18...Nxg5 when suddenly he has a lost position.

17. Kh1! Ne6

Position: a8 black rook, c8 black bishop, e8 black king, h8 black rook, a7 black pawn, b7 black pawn, c7 black pawn, d7 black pawn, h7 black pawn, e6 black knight, f6 white rook, c5 black queen, d5 white knight, g5 white queen, e4 white pawn, a2 white pawn, b2 white pawn, c2 white pawn, g2 white pawn, h2 white pawn, f1 white rook, h1 white king

Position after 17...Ne6

18. Rxe6+! dxe6 19. Nf6+!

winning the queen, so La Bourdonnais resigned here.

1–0

=== Maróczy vs. Chigorin, Vienna 1903 ===
1. e4 e5 2. f4 exf4 3. Nf3 g5 4. Bc4 g4 5. Nc3 gxf3 6. Qxf3 d6! 7. d4 Be6 8. Nd5 White can try 8.d5!? Bc8 9.Bxf4 as in Dufresne–Anderssen, Berlin 1851 (Korchnoi). 8... c6 9. 0-0 cxd5 10. exd5 Bf5 11. Bxf4 Bg6 12. Bb5+ Nd7 13. Rae1+ Be7 14. Bxd6 Kf8? Black had a clear advantage after 14...Qb6! 15.Qa3 Qxd4 16.Rf2 Be4 17.Bxe7 Nxe7 18.d6 Rg8 19.Rxe4 Qxe4 20.Re2 Qxe2 21.Bxe2 Nc6 in Barth–Lenz, corr. 1913 (Korchnoi). 15. Rxe7 Nxe7 16. Re1 Kg7 17. Bxe7 Qa5 18. Qe2 Nf8 19. Bf6+ Kg8 20. Qe5 h6 21. Bxh8 f6 22. Qe7 Kxh8 23. Qxf6+ Kg8 24. Re7 1–0

== Alternatives to 5...gxf3 ==
- 5...Nc6 transposes to the Hamppe–Muzio Gambit after 6.0-0, or to the Pierce Gambit after 6.d4.
- 5...d5 is also likely to lead to a transposition after 6.Bxd5 gxf3 7.Qxf3 or 6.Nxd5 gxf3 7.Qxf3.

=== Marshall vs. Leonhardt, Hamburg 1911 ===
1.e4 e5 2.f4 exf4 3.Nf3 g5 4.Bc4 g4 5.Nc3 d5 6.Bxd5 gxf3 7.Qxf3 Nf6 8.Qxf4 Be7 9.0-0 0-0 10.b4 a5 11.Bb2 axb4 12.Ne2 Ra6 13.Qh6 Kh8 14.Nf4 Rg8 15.Bxf7 Bf8 16.Qh5 Rg4 17.Ne6 Bg7 18.Bxf6 1–0

== See also ==
- List of chess openings
- List of chess openings named after people
