= Göttingen manuscript =

Earliest known work devoted entirely to modern chess

The Göttingen manuscript is the earliest known work devoted entirely to modern chess. It is a Latin text of 33 leaves held at the University of Göttingen. A quarto parchment manuscript of 33 leaves, ff. 1–15a are a discussion of twelve chess openings, f. 16 is blank, and ff. 17–31b are a selection of thirty chess problems, one on each page with a diagram and solution. Authorship and exact date of the manuscript are unknown. Similarities to Lucena's Repeticion de Amores e Arte de Axedres con CL iuegos de partido (c. 1497) have led some scholars to surmise that it was written by Lucena or that it was one of Lucena's sources. Although the manuscript is generally assumed to be older than Lucena's work, this is not established. The manuscript has been ascribed possible writing dates of 1500–1505 or 1471.

The manuscript is exclusively devoted to modern chess (using the modern rules of movement for the pawn, bishop, and queen, although castling had not yet taken its current form), and no mention is made of the earlier form. The rules are not explained, so the manuscript must have been written at a time and place when the new rules were well established, or it was addressed to a player familiar with the new rules. The addressee of the manuscript is not named, but was evidently a nobleman of high rank. Some particulars of the manuscript suggest that the author was from Spain or Portugal and that it was copied at some point in France, although this is not certain.

== Openings ==
The attention paid to the opening in the manuscript reflected the greater importance of study of the early part of the game caused by the changes to the movement of the pieces in modern chess. The old game tended to develop slowly, with victory often achieved by capturing all enemy pieces to the bare king. The modern game developed much more quickly due to the new ability of the pawn to make an initial move of two squares, and the greatly enhanced powers of the bishop and queen. Checkmate became a more common end to the game, and study was required to develop early attacks and defend against them. Subsequent chess writing would continue to emphasise study of the opening.

The twelve openings in the manuscript include four attacks in which the Prince to whom the work is addressed is the first player, and eight defences where he is the second player. They include one example each of 1.c4 (English Opening) and 1.f4 (Bird's Opening), two examples of 1.d4 (Queen's Pawn Openings) including a Queen's Gambit, and eight examples of 1.e4 (King's Pawn Openings). Every King's Pawn Opening included is a Double King's Pawn Opening as Black always responds to 1.e4 with 1...e5. One example of the Bishop's Opening (2.Bc4) is given. The other seven King's Pawn Openings are King's Knight Openings (2.Nf3), to which the author seems to suggest that 2...Nc6 is the best defence. Although no evaluation of the resulting positions is given, some of the examples continue well into the middlegame; the eighth is given through move 33. In the order in which they appear in the manuscript, the openings are:

1. Damiano Defence (1.e4 e5 2.Nf3 f6)
2. Philidor Defence (1.e4 e5 2.Nf3 d6), example favouring White
3. Giuoco Piano (1.e4 e5 2.Nf3 Nc6 3.Bc4 Bc5)
4. Petrov Defence (1.e4 e5 2.Nf3 Nf6)
5. Bishop's Opening (1.e4 e5 2.Bc4)
6. Ruy Lopez (1.e4 e5 2.Nf3 Nc6 3.Bb5 Bc5 Classical Defence)
7. Ponziani Opening (1.e4 e5 2.Nf3 Nc6 3.c3)
8. Philidor Defence, example favouring Black
9. Queen's Gambit Accepted (1.d4 d5 2.c4 dxc4)
10. 1.d4 d5 2.Bf4 Bf5 (a form of the London System)
11. Bird's Opening (1.f4)
12. English Opening (1.c4)

== Problems ==
All thirty problems are also found in Lucena's work, and all but one (number 24) are found in Damiano. Many of the thirty problems are given special conditions, such as specific pieces that cannot move or requirements that mate be delivered by a pawn or by two consecutive checks by pawns. Examples of problems in the manuscript:

Göttingen 5

Position: d6 black king, h6 black pawn, b5 white queen, f5 white pawn, h5 white knight, c4 white pawn, b3 white knight

White mates in 2
Solution:
1.Qb7 2.Qd5#
Göttingen 18

Position: h8 black king, a7 white rook, d5 white pawn, e5 white king, g5 white pawn, h3 black pawn, h2 white knight

White mates with two pawns in 6 exactly
Solution:
1.Ng4 2.Nf6 3.Ra8+ 4.Rg8+ 5.g6+ 6.d6#
Göttingen 20

Position: b8 white knight, c7 white rook, a6 black bishop, e6 white knight, d5 white queen, a4 black king, b4 black pawn, c4 black pawn, g4 white bishop, h4 white rook, c3 white bishop, a2 white pawn, b2 white king

White mates with pawn in 6 exactly
Solution:
1.Bd1+ 2.Qd7+ 3.Qd3 4.axb3+ 5.bxc4+ 6.c5#
Göttingen 24

Position: a8 black king, e7 white king, f7 white knight, a6 white pawn, b6 white pawn, a2 black pawn, a1 white bishop

White mates with two pawns in 7 exactly
Solution:
1.Kd7 2.Ne5 3.Nc4 4.Na5 5.Bd4 6.a7+ or b7+ 7.b7# or a7#
