= Louis Eichborn =

German banker and chess player

Personal information
- Born: Louis Theodor Eichborn; 1812 Breslau (now called Wrocław, Poland)
- Died: 9 May 1882 (aged 70) Breslau

Chess career
- Country: Germany

Louis Eichborn (1812 – 9 May 1882) was a banker and a strong amateur chess player who played a series of casual games against Adolf Anderssen who was among the best players in the world in the 1850s. Almost all of his known games are wins against Anderssen, found in Eichborn's papers after his death.

== Life ==
Eichborn was born and lived in Breslau, Germany (now called Wrocław, Poland). As a wealthy banker and keen chess player, Eichborn found time to regularly play the best players in Breslau, most notably Adolf Anderssen.

== The best chess player ever? ==
It appears that Eichborn recorded his best games against Anderssen (most of which were wins for Eichborn) in a notebook which was found after his death. The games were published in the book Adolf Anderssen, der Altmeister Schachspielkunst, by Gottschall in 1912.

About 15 other Eichborn's games with other opponents, for example Tassilo von Heydebrand und der Lasa whom he also beat, were published by Deutsche Schachzeitung during his lifetime.

Chessgames.com records 34 games between Eichborn and Anderssen, the results of which were as follows:

- 1851-2: 9 wins, 1 draw, no losses
- 1853: 9 wins, no draws, 1 loss
- 1854-5: 6 wins, no draws, 1 loss
- 1857-9: 6 wins, no draws no losses
- Total: 31 wins, 1 draw, 2 losses

Other sources record 29 Eichborn wins with two incomplete games.

If these results represented all of the games played between the two opponents, such a record against a player who was amongst the best in the world (amongst other victories, Anderssen won the first international chess tournament, held in London in 1851) is unprecedented. Although ratings were not calculated for players in the 1850s, it is possible (for example using a system similar to Chessmetrics) to calculate what Eichborn's rating would have been on the basis of these games. Comparing this calculation against that of other players through history leads to the conclusion that Eichborn is the best chess player of all time. For example, whilst Garry Kasparov's best rating was 2851, and Bobby Fischer's was 2785, Eichborn's performance against Anderssen would have given him a rating of almost 3000.

However, these calculations are highly unlikely to be accurate, particularly because it is not known how many games in total he lost against Anderssen – it is speculated that there may have been many. It is also unclear whether these games were played at odds – based on Anderssen's play in the surviving games, it has been suggested that any drawn game counted as a win for Eichborn. Realistically, the lack of known games played by Eichborn makes it difficult to assess his playing strength, although it is clear from his surviving games that he was a strong player.

== See also ==
- Comparison of top chess players throughout history
