= Ernst Falkbeer =

Austrian chess player (1819–1885)

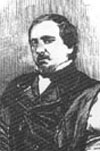
Ernst Falkbeer

Ernst Karl Falkbeer (27 June 1819 – 14 December 1885) was an Austrian chess master and journalist.

== Life and chess career ==
Falkbeer was born in Brno in Moravia, Austrian Empire (today in the Czech Republic). He moved to Vienna to study law, but ended up becoming a journalist. During the European Revolutions of 1848, he fled Vienna for Germany. He played chess with German masters Adolf Anderssen and Jean Dufresne in Leipzig, Berlin, Dresden, and Bremen.

In 1853 Falkbeer was allowed to return to Vienna. Two years later, in January 1855, he started the first Austrian chess magazine, Wiener Schachzeitung, which lasted only a few months. He went to London where he played two matches against Henry Bird. Falkbeer lost the 1856 match (+1 −2), but won the 1856/7 match (+5 −4 =4). At the Birmingham 1858 knockout tournament he beat Saint-Amant in round two (+2 −1), but lost in the round four final to Johann Löwenthal (+1 −3 =4) to finish second.

Falkbeer edited a chess column for The Sunday Times from April 1857 to November 1859. He returned to Vienna in 1864, later writing a chess column in Neue Illustrierte Zeitung from 1877 to 1885. He died in Vienna on 14 December 1885.

== Legacy ==
Falkbeer is more famous for his contributions to chess theory than for his individual play. He introduced the Falkbeer Countergambit, still considered one of the main lines in the King's Gambit Declined. Siegbert Tarrasch held the view that Falkbeer's Countergambit refuted the King's Gambit entirely.
