= John William Schulten =

German-American chess player (1821–1875)

John William Schulten (1821–1875), also spelled Johann Wilhelm, was a 19th-century chess master from Germany and the United States. In the 1840s and 1850s, he traveled widely in Europe and the United States to play some of the best chess players in the world—Adolf Anderssen, Alexandre Deschapelles, Daniel Harrwitz, Bernhard Horwitz, Lionel Kieseritzky, Paul Morphy, Gustav Neumann, Jules Arnous de Rivière, Eugéne Rousseau, Pierre St. Amant, Charles Stanley, Von der Lasa, and Johannes Zukertort—losing to most of them. Although he lost matches against Kieseritzky and Morphy, he did beat both of them once. His only win against Morphy was in New York City in 1857:

Move number	Movement
1	e4 e5
2	f4 d5
3	exd5 e4
4	Nc3 Nf6
5	Bc4 c6
6	d3 Bb4
7	dxe4 Nxe4
8	Bd2 Bxc3
9	Bxc3 O-O
10	Qh5 Re8
11	O-O-O Nxc3
12	bxc3 Qa5
13	Kb2 g6
14	Qh6 Bg4
15	Nf3 Bxf3
16	gxf3 b5
17	f5 bxc4
18	f6 1–0

Schulten has a chess opening variation named after him—the Schulten Defense to the Italian Game/Evans Gambit: 1.e4 e5 2.Nf3 Nc6 3.Bc4 Bc5 4.b4 Bxb4 5.c3 Ba5 6.d4 exd4 7.O-O b5.
