= American Chess Quarterly =

Defunct American chess magazine

First issue of the American Chess Quarterly (Summer 1961)

The American Chess Quarterly was a chess magazine that was published in the United States from Summer 1961 to 1965 by Nature Food Centres. The headquarters of the magazine was in Cambridge, MA.

Sixteen issues were published, in four volumes of four issues each, from Summer 1961 through April–May–June 1965. The publication count is sometimes considered to be Seventeen issues because Volume One Number Three was a two-part issue. Its principal editor was American grandmaster Larry Evans. Complete sets of the American Chess Quarterly magazine are becoming more difficult to acquire and typically command prices at auction in the $1,000-$2,000 range.

== Fischer article ==
The most famous article published in its pages was "A Bust to the King's Gambit" by U.S. Champion and future World Champion Bobby Fischer, which appeared as the first article in the first issue. In that article, Fischer advocated what became known as the Fischer Defense to the King's Gambit (1.e4 e5 2.f4 exf4 3.Nf3 d6), brashly claiming, "In my opinion the King's Gambit is busted. It loses by force." Fischer later played the King's Gambit himself with great success, winning all three tournament games in which he played it, but choosing the Bishop's Gambit (1.e4 e5 2.f4 exf4 3.Bc4) rather than the King's Knight's Gambit (3.Nf3) treated in his article.
