= Paul Rudolf von Bilguer =

German chess player

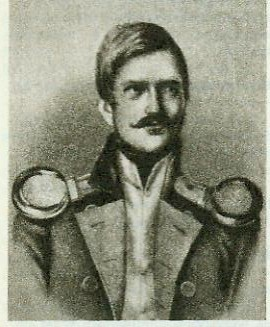
Rudolph von Bilguer

Paul Rudolf (or Rudolph) von Bilguer (21 September 1815 – 16 September 1840) was a German chess master and chess theoretician from Ludwigslust in the Grand Duchy of Mecklenburg-Schwerin.

Bilguer, who was a lieutenant in the Prussian army, was sent to Berlin on a course, where he met the six gifted German players with whom he formed a group that became known as the 'Berlin Pleiades'. He resigned his commission and devoted his time to chess. He was considered to be the most brilliant of the 'Pleiades' and was a good blindfold player.

To the modern chess world he is known above all as the co-author of the Handbuch des Schachspiels. He died at age 24, probably of tuberculosis, before finishing the Handbuch, but the work was completed by his friend Tassilo von Heydebrand und der Lasa, who gave primary credit to Bilguer. The Handbuch was for many years considered the definitive reference work on the game of chess, and on openings in particular. It was a precursor to later standard opening reference works such as Modern Chess Openings and Encyclopedia of Chess Openings.
