= Bishop's Gambit =

King's Bishop Gambit
Position: a8 black rook, b8 black knight, c8 black bishop, d8 black queen, e8 black king, f8 black bishop, g8 black knight, h8 black rook, a7 black pawn, b7 black pawn, c7 black pawn, d7 black pawn, f7 black pawn, g7 black pawn, h7 black pawn, c4 white bishop, e4 white pawn, f4 black pawn, a2 white pawn, b2 white pawn, c2 white pawn, d2 white pawn, g2 white pawn, h2 white pawn, a1 white rook, b1 white knight, c1 white bishop, d1 white queen, e1 white king, g1 white knight, h1 white rook
- Moves: 1.e4 e5 2.f4 exf4 3. Bc4
- ECO: C33
- Parent: King's Gambit

The Bishop's Gambit is chess opening that begins with the moves:

1. e4 e5
2. f4 exf4
3. Bc4

The Bishop's Gambit is a variation of the King's Gambit Accepted. White permits Black to play 3...Qh4+, removing White's castling rights, but White can respond with 4.Kf1 rather than the awkward 4.Ke2, a move seen in certain other KGA lines. White's king is reasonably safe on f1 and White can gain several tempi on the Black queen following 4.Nf3. White's plan is usually to develop quickly and start an attack on the kingside using the half-open f-file and the bishop on c4. Many of Black's defenses include the move ...d5, which attacks the bishop on c4. Besides 3...Qh4+, Black usually responds with 3...Nf6 or 3...d5, and there are many sidelines.

The Bishop's Gambit is the main alternative to 3.Nf3, the main line of the King's Gambit. In many lines, White can transpose to positions normally reached via 3.Nf3, but often opts not to. It is a significantly less common move, so there is less well developed theory for it. The famous Immortal Game started with this line. Some grandmasters have argued it to be superior to 3.Nf3.

== Ideas behind the opening ==
The general plans are mostly the same as in the King's Knight Gambit, especially attacking along the half-open f-file, but there are some differences.

As there is no knight on f3, White's queen is free to move along the diagonal d1-h5. Also, the most frequent idea in the King's Knight Gambit, ...g5 and later ...g4, becomes weak due to the lack of a White knight on f3. White often delays developing the knight or instead develops it to e2. From e2, the knight also can support the other knight on c3, which is especially useful if Black plays the pin Bb4.

In some lines, White's queen moves to f3, building a battery with a rook on f1 (after 0-0), piling up on Black's pawn on f4. Black can try to give the pawn back via f3. This is especially strong after White castles kingside and has to take back with gxf3, shattering the kingside pawn structures. White seen good results by castling queenside and using the half-open g-file for an attack on Black's king.

== Classical Defense: 3...Qh4+ 4.Kf1 ==
Position: a8 black rook, b8 black knight, c8 black bishop, e8 black king, f8 black bishop, g8 black knight, h8 black rook, a7 black pawn, b7 black pawn, c7 black pawn, d7 black pawn, f7 black pawn, g7 black pawn, h7 black pawn, c4 white bishop, e4 white pawn, f4 black pawn, h4 black queen, a2 white pawn, b2 white pawn, c2 white pawn, d2 white pawn, g2 white pawn, h2 white pawn, a1 white rook, b1 white knight, c1 white bishop, d1 white queen, f1 white king, g1 white knight, h1 white rook

Classical Defense

This was the main line in the 19th century. It was a side line in most of the 20th century, but is now about as common as 3...Nf6. Black can also delay the check for one move. White loses castling rights, but the king is safe on f1 (4.Ke2 is extremely rare) and can not be further attacked by the queen. White can start attacking Black's queen with moves like Nf3 and win several tempi. Emanuel Lasker considered 3...d5 4.Bxd5 Qh4+ to be a refutation of the gambit, but according to modern theory it is playable for both sides.

In general, it is advised for White to avoid attacking Black's queen without a clear plan. If Black plays 4...g5 or 4...Nf6, the queen loses access to d8, e7, and f6. Because of this, attacking the queen becomes slightly stronger, as the queen's safe squares to move to are limited to the relatively passive h5 and h6. Another idea for White is to play Qf3 and attack Black's queen with g3. White's queen defends the rook on h1, which is necessary to support g3. Another idea after g3 is to play Kg2 and Rf1.

=== Cozio Variation: 4...d6 ===
This is the most common move. It is arguably responsible for the revival of the Classical Defense. The line is less sharp (by King's Gambit standards) than alternatives like 4...Nf6. The most common continuation is 5.Nf3, after which Black may retreat the queen to many different squares (or play 5...Bg4); best regarded are 5...Qh6 and 5...Qf6, which maintain the queen's protection of the pawn on f4. Another option is 5...Qh5, intending a later ...h6 to support ...g5.

White avoids 5.Nf3 in many common lines, instead waiting for a better moment to kick Black's queen. The most common alternatives are 5.Nc3 and 5.d4. 5...Be6, 5...Bg4, 5...Nf6, and 5...Nc6 are all common in response to both. Black often castles queenside. Against 5.Nc3, 5...c6 is also common, preventing White's knight from moving to b5 and d5. Against 5.d4, Black can also transpose to the Lopez Variation with 5...g5.

=== Lopez Variation: 4...g5 ===
Position: a8 black rook, b8 black knight, c8 black bishop, e8 black king, h8 black rook, a7 black pawn, b7 black pawn, c7 black pawn, d7 black pawn, e7 black knight, f7 black pawn, g7 black bishop, h7 black pawn, g5 black pawn, c4 white bishop, d4 white pawn, e4 white pawn, h4 black queen, c3 white knight, g3 black pawn, a2 white pawn, b2 white pawn, c2 white pawn, g2 white king, h2 white pawn, a1 white rook, c1 white bishop, d1 white queen, g1 white knight, h1 white rook

McDonnell Attack, main line: 4...g5 5.Nc3 Bg7 6.d4 Ne7 7.g3 fxg3 8.Kg2!

This aggressive line, which can also be referred to as the Classical Defense, was once a popular move, but is now only occasionally played. Regardless, its theory remains well explored. White can develop quickly while the Black queen is unable to return to d8 to defend c7. However, Black creates pressure on White's weak king. The most common continuation is 5.Nc3 Bg7. Following this, 6.g3 leads to the McDonnell Attack, the main line. 6.d4 is the main alternative and is often followed by 6...Ne7, known as the Classical Defense. However, White can transpose to a superior line of the McDonnell Attack with 7.g3, so Black often plays 6...d6 instead. The McDonnell Attack often features the surprising move Kg2, despite Black's queen being precariously close. White's king is moved in order to blockade Black's pawn on g3, neutralizing the threat of ...g2+, as well as reinforcing the defense of the pawn on h2 and the rook on h1, which breaks Black's pin of the pawn against the rook. This enables the latent threat (hxg3) of a discovered attack by the rook against the queen.

Alternative lines include the Grimm Attack (6.d4 d6 7.e5) and the Fraser Variation (6.g3 fxg3 7.Qf3). 5.d4, 5.Nf3, and 5.Qf3, the Cozio Attack, are common fifth-move alternatives for White. Black can also avoid 5...Bg7, but this is rare. Transpositions are common. For example, Black frequently transposes to the Lopez from the Cozio Variation after 5.d4 g5, as White should not play the McDonnell Attack in this line. If it is attempted with 6.g3?!, Black can capitalize with 6...fxg3 7.Kg2? (7.Qf3 is playable but favors Black) gxh2 8.Rxh2 Qxe4+.

Position: a8 black rook, b8 black knight, c8 black bishop, e8 black king, f8 black bishop, h8 black rook, a7 black pawn, b7 black pawn, c7 black pawn, f7 black pawn, h7 black pawn, h6 black knight, d5 white bishop, g5 black pawn, e4 white pawn, h4 black queen, f3 white queen, a2 white pawn, b2 white pawn, c2 white pawn, d2 white pawn, g2 white king, h2 white pawn, a1 white rook, b1 white knight, c1 white bishop, g1 white knight, h1 white rook

Chigorin Attack, main line: 4...d5 5.Bxd5 g5 6.g3 fxg3 7.Qf3 g2+ 8.Kxg2 Nh6

The Chigorin Attack, also known as the Gifford Variation, is defined by 3.Bc4 d5 4.Bxd5 Qh4+ 5.Kf1 g5 6.g3, thus reaching the Lopez by transposition. Black's main options are 6...Qh6 and the main line 6...fxg3, which usually continues 7.Qf3 g2+ 8.Kxg2 Nh6. 8...f5 and 8...f6 are also possible.

=== 4...Nf6 ===
This move was very common in the 19th century and remains somewhat common. The idea of the move is to play 5...Ng4 and 6...Qf2#. White usually responds by immediately attacking the queen with 5.Nf3, after which Black has the choice of 5...Qh5 or 5...Qh6. 5.Nc3?! is also seen but regarded as inferior due to 5...Ng4, creating intense pressure on White's king.

=== Other lines ===
- 4...d5 has the same idea as the Bledow Variation. It most often continues 5.Bxd5, though 5.exd5 is again a playable sideline. Black often intends to transpose to the Lopez Variation with 5...g5, using 4...d5 to avoid the McDonnell Attack. This leads to the Chigorin Attack if White plays 6.g3, although White more often plays 6.Nf3, 6.Nc3, or 6.d4, with frequent transpositions. The most notable independent line is 5.Bxd5 Nf6. White usually responds with 6.Nf3, as 6.d4 concedes the bishop pair after 6...Nxd5 and 6.Nc3?! is weak to 6...Ng4.
- 4...Nc6, the Boden Defense, is comparable to the Cozio Variation in its approach. It most often continues with 5.d4 or 5.Nf3 and often ends up transposing to the Cozio.
- 4...Bc5?!, the Greco Variation, is playable but gives White a strong pawn center and a lead in development after 5.d4 Bb6 6.Nf3. The more complicated 5...d5 is also possible.
- 4...b5?! is a delayed Bryan Countergambit.
- 4...f5?! is a delayed Lopez-Gianutio Countergambit.

== Bogoljubov Variation: 3...Nf6 4.Nc3 ==
Position: a8 black rook, b8 black knight, c8 black bishop, d8 black queen, e8 black king, h8 black rook, a7 black pawn, b7 black pawn, f7 black pawn, g7 black pawn, h7 black pawn, d6 black bishop, f6 black knight, d5 black pawn, d4 white pawn, f4 black pawn, b3 white bishop, c3 white knight, a2 white pawn, b2 white pawn, c2 white pawn, e2 white knight, g2 white pawn, h2 white pawn, a1 white rook, c1 white bishop, d1 white queen, e1 white king, h1 white rook

Jaenisch Variation, main line: 3...Nf6 4.Nc3 c6 5.Bb3 d5 6.exd5 cxd5 7.d4 Bd6 8.Nge2

This has been dubbed the modern main line, although it is no longer as dominant as it was, and most often continues with 4...c6. Black's plan is to play ...d5 and get some active pieces. In many lines ...Bb4 is a good move, pinning a knight on c3. In some lines, White has to sacrifice the pawn e4 but gets a strong attack.

=== Jaenisch Variation: 4...c6 ===
This is the usual continuation of the Bogoljubov Variation, and that name is often used to refer to this line informally. The main line continues via either 5.Bb3 d5 6.exd5 cxd5 7.d4 or 5.d4 d5 6.exd5 cxd5 7.Bb3 (7.Bb5+ is an alternative), which lead to the same position. Black now can now easily develop to pieces on active squares and has an extra pawn but has weak pawns on d5 and f4 while White has no such weak pawns, a lead in development, and already has pressure on Black's pawns.

The most common continuation is 7...Bd6. A well regarded but uncommon alternative is 7...Bb4, permitting 8.Bxf4 immediately. After 7...Bd6, White usually plays 8.Nf3 or 8.Nge2. 8.Nge2 is better regarded, with Johansson and Simon Williams explaining that this attacks Black's pawn on f4, defends the knight on c3, which often is attacked by ...Bb4, and blocks the possible check ...Qe7+. White intends 9.0-0, which further pressures the pawn on f4.

A common alternative fifth move for White is 5.Qf3, usually continuing 5...d5 6.exd5 Bd6.

=== Paulsen Attack: 4...Bb4 5.e5 ===
Position: a8 black rook, b8 black knight, d8 black queen, e8 black king, g8 black rook, a7 black pawn, b7 black pawn, f7 black pawn, g7 white pawn, h7 black pawn, e6 black bishop, b5 black pawn, d5 black pawn, b4 black bishop, f4 black pawn, c3 white knight, a2 white pawn, b2 white pawn, c2 white pawn, d2 white pawn, e2 white queen, g2 white pawn, h2 white pawn, a1 white rook, c1 white bishop, e1 white king, g1 white knight, h1 white rook

Paulsen Attack, main line: 5.e5 d5 6.Bb5+ c6 7.exf6 cxb5 8.fxg7 Rg8 9.Qe2+ Be6

After 4...Bb4, a common alternative to 4...c6, 5.e5 is the most common move for White. The main line continues 5...d5 6.Bb5+ c6 (6...Nfd7 is another option). From there, the most common continuation is 7.exf6 cxb5 8.fxg7 Rg8 9.Qe2+ Be6 (or 8.Qe2+ Be6 9.fxg7 Rg8, transposing).

=== Other lines ===
- 4...d5 allows White a choice between 5.Nxd5, 5.Bxd5, and 5.exd5.
- 4...Nc6 usually continues 5.Nf3 and may also be reached from the Vienna Game. It was played multiple times by Efim Bogoljubow, the namesake of the variation.

== Bledow Variation: 3...d5 ==
Position: a8 black rook, b8 black knight, c8 black bishop, d8 black queen, e8 black king, f8 black bishop, g8 black knight, h8 black rook, a7 black pawn, b7 black pawn, c7 black pawn, f7 black pawn, g7 black pawn, h7 black pawn, d5 black pawn, c4 white bishop, e4 white pawn, f4 black pawn, a2 white pawn, b2 white pawn, c2 white pawn, d2 white pawn, g2 white pawn, h2 white pawn, a1 white rook, b1 white knight, c1 white bishop, d1 white queen, e1 white king, g1 white knight, h1 white rook

Bledow Variation

This is a third highly regarded defense. Black gives back the extra pawn in exchange for rapid development. White's usual reply is 4.Bxd5, which avoids the bishop being blocked by White's own pawn in the alternative 4.exd5, though that move is also playable. This offers transposition to the Classical Defense via 4...Qh4+ 5.Kf1, but the main line continues 4...Nf6, known as the Morphy Variation. 4...c6 and 4...Bd6 are known alternatives, but rare.

=== Morphy Variation: 4.Bxd5 Nf6 ===
This line is less common than the Classical and Buguljobov, but still frequently occurs. It most often continues 5.Nc3. 5.Bc4?! and 5.Nf3 are also possible. The latter was introduced by Paul Morphy in 1858.

Following 5.Nc3, a common continuation is 5...Bb4, most often followed by 6.Nf3 (or 6.Qf3) 0-0 7.0-0. Also common are the immediate exchanges 6...Bxc3 and 5...Nxd5 6.Nxd5.

=== Other lines ===
- 4.exd5, regarded as playable for White but inferior. This position can also occur by transposition from the Falkbeer Countergambit. The main line is 4...Qh4+ 5.Kf1 Bd6. Also common are 4...Nf6 and 4...Bd6.
- 4.Bxd5 Qh4+ 5.Kf1 Bd6 is the Borén-Svenonius Variation, which is also frequently reached from the Classical Defense via 4.Kf1 d5 5.Bxd5 Bd6.
- 4.Bxd5 c6 is the Anderssen Variation.

== Other lines ==
- 3...Nc6 is the Maurian Defense, which has received increased use in the 21st century. It usually continues with 4.d4, most often transposing to the Boden Defense with 4...Qh4+ 5.Kf1, or to the Vienna Game with 4...Nf6 5.Nc3. Also common is 4.Nf3, transposing to the King's Knight Gambit, and 4.Nc3, also transposing to the Vienna Game. The most notable independent line begins with 4.d4 Nf6 5.e5.
- 3...Nf6 is rarely not followed by 4.Nc3, but 4.d3 is possible. 4.e5 can be met with 4...d5.
- 3...d6 offers transposition to the Fischer Defense, but good alternatives are 4.d4 and 4.Nc3.
- 3...Be7 offers transposition to the Cunningham Defense. White can also play 4.Qh5!? or 4.d4, which are considered better than transposing.
- 3...h6 offers transposition to the Becker Defense or later the Fischer Defense, but a better option for White is to delay developing the knight and play h4 after ...g5.
- 3...Ne7, the Steinitz Defense, was often played by Ivan Sokolov and Wilhelm Steinitz. The idea is to play ...Ne7 and ...Ng6 to defend the pawn f4.
- 3...f5, the Lopez-Gianutio Countergambit or Nordic Countergambit. It originated from a game between Adolf Anderssen and Louis Eichborn in 1854. A notable continuation is 3...f5 4.Qe2 Qh4+ 5.Kd1 fxe4 6.Nc3 Kd8 (6...Be7 is an alternative), known as the Hein Variation. The early Qe2 allows White's king to run to d1 instead of f1 after ...Qh4+, a development rarely otherwise seen.
- 3...b5, the Bryan Countergambit. It tries to get the bishop c4 off the diagonal to f7. The idea is similar to b2-b4 in the Evans Gambit. The first game is from 1841 and was played by Lionel Kieseritzky against Desloges. The Immortal Game started with this line.
- 3...g5?!, the Anderssen Defense. White's best plan is to play h4 opening the h-file for the rook and attack with the queen. The move h4 can be prepared with 4.Nc3.
- 3...c6, the Ruy Lopez Defense, unrelated to the Ruy Lopez in terms of gameplay.
