= Kieseritzky Gambit =

Position: a8 black rook, b8 black knight, c8 black bishop, d8 black queen, e8 black king, f8 black bishop, g8 black knight, h8 black rook, a7 black pawn, b7 black pawn, c7 black pawn, d7 black pawn, f7 black pawn, h7 black pawn, e5 white knight, e4 white pawn, f4 black pawn, g4 black pawn, h4 white pawn, a2 white pawn, b2 white pawn, c2 white pawn, d2 white pawn, g2 white pawn, a1 white rook, b1 white knight, c1 white bishop, d1 white queen, e1 white king, f1 white bishop, h1 white rook
- Moves: 1.e4 e5 2.f4 exf4 3.Nf3 g5 4.h4 g4 5.Ne5
- ECO: C39
- Origin: Manuscript by Giulio Cesare Polerio, 1590
- Named after: Lionel Kieseritzky (1805-1853)
- Parent: King's Gambit

In chess, the Kieseritzky Gambit is an opening line in the King's Gambit. It begins with the moves:

1. e4 e5
2. f4 exf4
3. Nf3 g5
4. h4 g4
5. Ne5

This is the main line of the Classical Variation (3...g5) and one of the main lines of the King's Gambit in general. After Black attempts to establish defense of the pawn on f4, White reacts by immediately undermining the pawn chain with 4.h4, where Black has little choice but to play 4...g4. The gambit's overall assessment is still unclear but approximately equal. Boris Spassky used it to defeat Bobby Fischer in 1960, leading Fischer to develop the Fischer Defense (3...d6).

The Encyclopaedia of Chess Openings classifies the Kieseritzky Gambit under code C39. C39 is also the code for the Allgaier Gambit, in which White plays 5.Ng5?!, sacrificing the knight for an attack after 5...h6 6.Nxf7 Kxf7. The Allgaier Gambit is considered dubious.

== History ==
The opening now known as the Kieseritzky Gambit was first described by Polerio in the late 16th century. Greco also included a game with this opening in his 1620 collection. It was also analyzed by Salvio (1604) and Philidor (1749). In the first edition of the Handbuch in 1843, 5.Ne5 was considered under the heading of the Allgaier Gambit, but the editors noted that Kieseritzky had contributed significantly to the theory of 5.Ne5, which they advocated as superior to 5.Ng5 (an opinion shared by almost all subsequent analysts). The corresponding chapter in the second edition of the Handbuch in 1852 was headed "Allgaier and Kieseritzky's Gambit". Subsequently, the name Kieseritzky Gambit came into general use for 5.Ne5, Allgaier Gambit being used exclusively for 5.Ng5.

== Berlin Defense: 5...Nf6 ==
Position: a8 black rook, b8 black knight, c8 black bishop, d8 black queen, e8 black king, h8 black rook, a7 black pawn, b7 black pawn, c7 black pawn, f7 black pawn, h7 black pawn, d6 black bishop, d5 white pawn, e5 white knight, h5 black knight, c4 white bishop, d4 white pawn, f4 black pawn, g4 black pawn, h4 white pawn, a2 white pawn, b2 white pawn, c2 white pawn, g2 white pawn, a1 white rook, b1 white knight, c1 white bishop, d1 white queen, e1 white king, h1 white rook

Anderssen Defense, 8.d4 Nh5

5...Nf6 is the most common reply, attacking White's weak pawn on e4 and exerting control over central squares.

White almost always responds with 6.Bc4, 6.Nxg4, or 6.d4. 6.Nxg4 is relatively drawish compared to the other options.

=== 6.Bc4 ===
The line most often continues 6...d5 7.exd5 Bd6 8.d4 Nh5 which is also known as the Anderssen Defense and is considered the main line of the Kieseritzky Gambit itself. After 9.0-0 Qxh4 10.Qe1 Qxe1 11.Rxe1 the position is approximately equal. A relatively untested try is 9.Nc3!?, when one possible line is 9...Qe7 10.0-0 Bxe5 11.Nb5!. Dubbed the "Flude Line" by Shaw after the Australian correspondence player David Flude, it often leads to wild complications that are difficult for either side to navigate at the board.

The Rice Gambit, 6...d5 7.exd5 Bd6 8.0-0?!, has been discredited.

The main alternative to 7...Bd6 is 7...Bg7, the Deferred Paulsen Defense. The main line now is considered to be 8.d4 Nh5 9.0-0 Qxh4 10.Qe1 Qxe1 11.Rxe1 0-0 with equality.

If Black does not protect the pawn, playing for example 6...Bg7?!, White should avoid 7.Nxf7?! Qe7 8.Nxh8 d5!; correct is 7.Bxf7+! Kf8 8.Bb3.

=== 6.Nxg4 ===
Position: a8 black rook, b8 black knight, c8 black bishop, d8 black king, h8 black rook, a7 black pawn, b7 black pawn, d7 black pawn, e7 black bishop, f7 black pawn, h7 black pawn, h4 white pawn, d3 white pawn, a2 white pawn, b2 white pawn, c2 white pawn, e2 white queen, g2 white pawn, a1 white rook, b1 white knight, e1 white king, f1 white bishop, h1 black knight

6.Nxg4 Nxe4 7.d3 Ng3 8.Bxf4 Nxh1, forcing continuation through 13.Nxe7 Bxe7

Position: a8 black rook, b8 black knight, c8 black bishop, e8 black king, f8 black bishop, a7 black pawn, b7 black pawn, c7 black pawn, d7 black pawn, e7 black queen, f7 black pawn, h7 black pawn, h4 white pawn, c3 white knight, d3 white pawn, a2 white pawn, b2 white pawn, c2 white pawn, e2 white bishop, f2 white bishop, g2 black rook, a1 white rook, d1 white queen, e1 white king, h1 white rook

6.Nxg4 Nxe4 7.d3 Ng3 8.Bxf4 Qe7+ 9.Be2 Rg8 10.Bxg3 Rxg4 11.Bf2 Rxg2 12.Nc3

Black often takes White's undefended pawn with 6...Nxe4. This invites the surprising forcing continuation 7.d3 Ng3 8.Bxf4 Nxh1 9.Qe2+ Qe7 10.Nf6+ Kd8 11.Bxc7+ Kxc7 12.Nd5+ Kd8 13.Nxe7 Bxe7, leading to an extremely imbalanced position where White is down a rook, bishop, and knight in exchange for Black's queen and one pawn.

Black may exit the sequence by instead playing 8...Qe7+, which most commonly continues 9.Be2 Rg8 10.Bxg3 Rxg4 11.Bf2 Rxg2 12.Nc3. Black also often plays 9...Qb4+, threatening both White's bishop on f4 and pawn on b2. White usually responds by trading queens with 10.Qd2 Qxd2.

Alternative sixth moves for Black include 6...d5, the de Rivière Variation, typically continuing 7.Nxf6+ Qxf6, as well as 6...d6, transposing to the Kolisch Defense, and 6...Nc6.

=== 6.d4 ===
This is another common move, and most often continues 6...d6 7.Nd3 Nxe4 8.Bxf4 Bg7 9.c3, leaving an open center.

8...Qe7 is a common alternative for Black, enabling a discovered check if the knight on e4 moves. Thus, White usually responds with 9.Qe2 or 9.Be2.

== Kolisch Defense: 5...d6 ==
Position: a8 black rook, b8 black knight, c8 black bishop, e8 black king, f8 black bishop, h8 black rook, a7 black pawn, b7 black pawn, c7 black pawn, f7 black pawn, h7 black pawn, d6 black pawn, f6 black queen, e4 white pawn, f4 black pawn, h4 white pawn, a2 white pawn, b2 white pawn, c2 white pawn, d2 white pawn, g2 white pawn, a1 white rook, b1 white knight, c1 white bishop, d1 white queen, e1 white king, f1 white bishop, h1 white rook

Kolisch Defense, 6.Nxg4 Nf6 7.Nxf6+ Qxf6

Position: a8 black rook, b8 black knight, c8 black bishop, d8 black queen, e8 black king, g8 black knight, h8 black rook, a7 black pawn, b7 black pawn, c7 black pawn, d7 black pawn, f7 black pawn, h7 black pawn, d4 white pawn, e4 white pawn, f4 black pawn, g3 black bishop, a2 white pawn, b2 white pawn, c2 white pawn, f2 white knight, g2 white pawn, a1 white rook, b1 white knight, c1 white bishop, d1 white queen, e1 white king, f1 white bishop, h1 white rook

Kolisch Defense, 6.Nxg4 Be7 8.d4 Bxh4+ 8.Nf2 Bg3

This is the main sound alternative to 5...Nf6. The main line continues 6.Nxg4 Nf6 7.Nxf6+ (or 7.Nf2) Qxf6, returning the gambited pawn in exchange for quick development. Black also often plays 6...Be7, which regains the pawn, most commonly continuing 7.d4 Bxh4+ 8.Nf2 Bg3, leaving the bishop rather confined but difficult to dislodge.

== Long Whip Variation: 5...h5?! ==
Position: a8 black rook, b8 black knight, c8 black bishop, d8 black queen, e8 black king, g8 black knight, a7 black pawn, b7 black pawn, c7 black pawn, d7 black pawn, f7 black pawn, h7 black rook, h6 black bishop, e5 white knight, h5 black pawn, c4 white bishop, d4 white pawn, e4 white pawn, f4 black pawn, g4 black pawn, h4 white pawn, c3 white knight, a2 white pawn, b2 white pawn, c2 white pawn, g2 white pawn, a1 white rook, c1 white bishop, d1 white queen, e1 white king, h1 white rook

Jaenisch Variation

Formerly considered a critical test of the Kieseritzky Gambit, this line is now considered dubious. Black goes to considerable lengths to hold on to the pawn, at the expense of a large lead in development and attacking chances for White. White's usual reply is 6.Bc4, with play most commonly continuing with 6...Nh6 or 6...Rh7. The line 6.Bc4 Rh7 7.d4 Bh6 8.Nc3 is known as the Jaenisch Variation. 7...d6 and 7...f3 are more common alternatives.

== Black's fifth move alternatives ==
- 5...d5, the Brentano (or Campbell) Defense. White's best reply is 6.d4. The Kaplanek Variation, 6.d4 Nf6 7.exd5 Qxd5 8.Nc3 Bb4 9.Kf2, and the Caro Variation, 6.d4 Nf6 7.Bxf4 Nxe4 8.Nd2, are two known lines.
- 5...Qe7, the Salvio (or Rosenthal) Defense. White's best reply is 6.d4. A risky counterattacking line is 6.d4 f5 7.Bc4, the Cozio Variation.
- 5...Bg7, the Paulsen Defense. White usually replies with 6.d4 or 6.Nxg4.
- 5...Nc6, the Neumann Defense. White's best reply is again 6.d4.
- 5...Be7?, the Polerio Defense. White gains an advantage with 6.Bc4.

== See also ==
- List of chess openings
- List of chess openings named after people
