= Karl Schorn =

German painter and chess master (1803–1850)

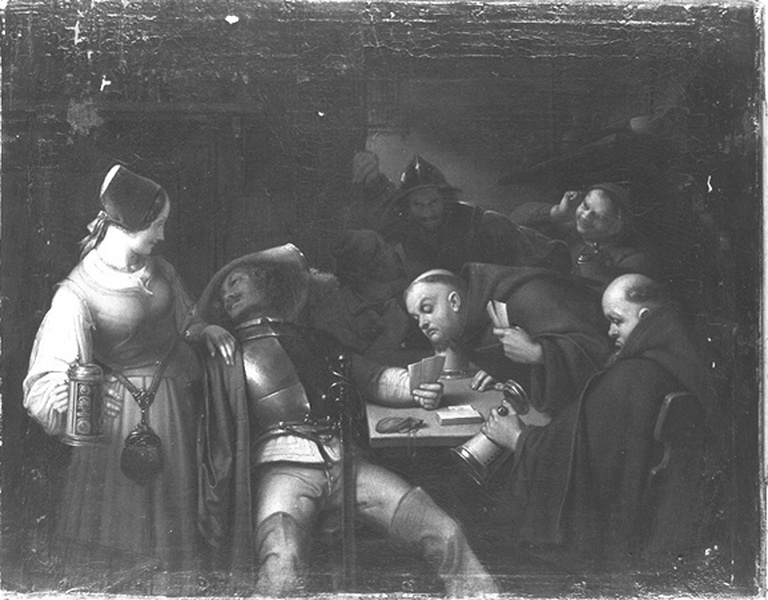
Karl Schorn: Kartenspieler (1837). Alte Nationalgalerie, Berlin

Karl (Carl) Schorn (16 October 1803, Düsseldorf – 7 October 1850, Munich) was a German painter and chess master.

He was a member of the Berlin Pleiades (the seven stars of German chess) in the first half of the 19th century.
