= Handbuch des Schachspiels =

1843 chess book by Tassilo von Heydebrand und der Lasa

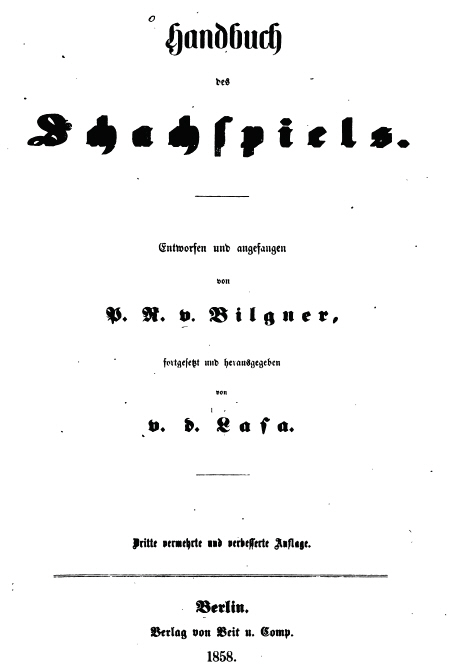
- Handbuch des Schachspiels (1858)
- Author: Paul Rudolf von Bilguer; Tassilo von Heydebrand und der Lasa
- Language: German
- Subject: Chess
- Publisher: Veit
- Publication date: 1843

Handbuch des Schachspiels (Handbook of Chess, often simply called the Handbuch) is a chess book, first published in 1843 by Tassilo von Heydebrand und der Lasa. It was a comprehensive reference book on the game, and one of the most important references on opening theory for many decades. The Handbuch had been the project of Paul Rudolf von Bilguer, who was with von der Lasa a member of the Berlin Chess Club and the influential group of chess masters later called the Berlin Pleiades. Bilguer died in 1840, with the work still in the early stages. Von der Lasa completed the project and saw it published, with his friend von Bilguer alone named as author. It contained comprehensive analyses of all opening variations then known, plus a section on the history and literature of chess.

== Editions ==
Von der Lasa prepared four further editions (1852, 1858, 1864, and 1874). The sixth edition (1880) was by Constantin Schwede; and the seventh edition (1891) was by Emil Schallopp, with the assistance of Louis Paulsen. Carl Schlechter, who had drawn a match for the World Championship with Emanuel Lasker in 1910, prepared the eighth and final edition. Published in eleven parts between 1912 and 1916, it totaled 1,040 pages and included contributions by Rudolf Spielmann, Siegbert Tarrasch, and Richard Teichmann. International Master William Hartston called it "a superb work, perhaps the last to encase successfully the whole of chess knowledge within a single volume".

== Works cited ==
- Hooper, David & Kenneth Whyld (1996), "Handbuch", The Oxford Companion To Chess, Oxford University, ISBN 0-19-280049-3
- Digitized copy of the Handbuch, 1st (1843) ed, Bavarian State Library
