= King's Gambit =

Chess opening

Position: a8 black rook, b8 black knight, c8 black bishop, d8 black queen, e8 black king, f8 black bishop, g8 black knight, h8 black rook, a7 black pawn, b7 black pawn, c7 black pawn, d7 black pawn, f7 black pawn, g7 black pawn, h7 black pawn, e5 black pawn, e4 white pawn, f4 white pawn, a2 white pawn, b2 white pawn, c2 white pawn, d2 white pawn, g2 white pawn, h2 white pawn, a1 white rook, b1 white knight, c1 white bishop, d1 white queen, e1 white king, f1 white bishop, g1 white knight, h1 white rook
- Moves: 1.e4 e5 2.f4
- ECO: C30–C39
- Origin: No later than 16th century
- Parent: Open Game

The King's Gambit is a chess opening that begins with the moves:

1. e4 e5
2. f4

White offers a pawn to divert Black's e-pawn from the center. If Black accepts the gambit, White will usually target the weak square f7, defended only by the king. A downside to the King's Gambit is that it weakens White's own king's position. Black can also decline the gambit, usually by the Falkbeer Countergambit (2...d5) or the Classical Defense (2...Bc5).

The King's Gambit is one of the oldest documented openings, appearing in the earliest of chess books, Luis Ramírez de Lucena's Repetición de Amores y Arte de Ajedrez (1497). It was examined by the 17th-century Italian chess player Giulio Cesare Polerio. It is considered an opening characteristic of Romantic chess, known for giving rise to extremely sharp and unusual positions. It was one of the most popular openings until the late 19th century, when improvements in defensive technique led to a decline in popularity.

== History ==
The King's Gambit is a very old chess opening. One early variation is so old it features a move no longer possible under the modern rules of chess (1.e4 e5 2.f4 exf4 3.d4 Qh4+ 4.g3 fxg3 5.Ke1-g2). The opening is recorded in a work credited to the medieval writer Luis Ramírez de Lucena, the earliest game in the ChessBase MegaDatabase to feature it dates from 1560, and the Spanish priest Ruy López de Segura (c. 1530 – c. 1580) was the first to publish analysis of it. The opening's reputation was enhanced by Gioachino Greco, who used it excellently on several occasions in the early 17th century.

Animation of the Immortal Game, which featured the King's Gambit.

The King's Gambit was most popular during the era of Romantic chess, when bold attacking tactics were more important to chess-playing gentlemen than positional strategy. Romantic players enjoyed the opening's heroic and fearless spirit, the core of its appeal—White not only gambits a pawn, but also opens two key diagonals which normally protect his king, in search of initiative and control of the center. It was the opening used in the famous 1851 brilliancy called the Immortal Game. Howard Staunton's Chess-Player's Handbook (1847) devoted 109 pages out of a total 343 on openings to the King's Gambit, while as late as 1883 George H. D. Gossip's Chess-Player's Manual discussed the opening for some 238 pages.

By the time of Gossip, however, the King's Gambit was already in decline, as leading players became aware that it and other popular gambits were likely unsound. In the first six world chess championship matches, only one King's Gambit was played. The first world champion Wilhelm Steinitz argued that attacks should only be started when the opposing player made a mistake and was therefore disadvantaged. As 1...e5 was not a mistake, Steinitz believed the King's Gambit was thus logically flawed. The advances in positional play and understanding in the early 20th century, led by players such as José Raúl Capablanca, saw the gambit decline in standing still further; it was similarly disdained by the hypermodernists such as Aron Nimzowitsch and Richard Réti, who knew that it could not achieve their goal of controlling the center from afar. In the 1960s, Bobby Fischer argued in a famous article, "A Bust to the King's Gambit", that the opening loses by force, including to his own Fischer Defense.

Modern King's Gambit examples

- Boris Spassky vs. David Bronstein (1960)
- Boris Spassky vs. Bobby Fischer (1960)
- Boris Spassky vs. Zsuzsa Polgar (1988)
- Magnus Carlsen vs. Yue Wang (2010)
- Hikaru Nakamura vs. Magnus Carlsen (2023)

After Rudolf Spielmann, known as the "Last Knight of the King's Gambit", ceased playing it regularly, the opening has remained very rare at the highest levels. Nevertheless, it did not die out entirely and has been employed by adventurous players including Alexander Alekhine, Paul Keres, Mikhail Tal, Boris Spassky, and notwithstanding his article, even Fischer. More modern players include the Englishmen Mark Hebden and Joseph Gallagher, whose Winning with the King's Gambit (1992) was very popular, and the sisters Sofia and Judit Polgár. The opening has never lost its popularity among chess club-level players. Paul van der Sterren, a modern grandmaster, calls the gambit:

...without a doubt the most fascinating of all openings. Surrounded by an aura of mystery, courage and heroism, it is this classical opening which (within the limits of the game of chess) comes closest to the eternal myth of the hero who leaves all earthly possessions behind and sets off in search of the Holy Grail. For it is not just technical competence that is required to play this opening (i.e. tactical genius), but first and foremost an absolute refusal to compromise and an attitude of total commitment.

== King's Gambit Accepted: 2...exf4 ==
Position: a8 black rook, b8 black knight, c8 black bishop, d8 black queen, e8 black king, f8 black bishop, g8 black knight, h8 black rook, a7 black pawn, b7 black pawn, c7 black pawn, d7 black pawn, f7 black pawn, g7 black pawn, h7 black pawn, e4 white pawn, f4 black pawn, a2 white pawn, b2 white pawn, c2 white pawn, d2 white pawn, g2 white pawn, h2 white pawn, a1 white rook, b1 white knight, c1 white bishop, d1 white queen, e1 white king, f1 white bishop, g1 white knight, h1 white rook

King's Gambit Accepted

After Black accepts the gambit, 3.Nf3 (the King's Knight's Gambit) is the most popular move, the main alternative being 3.Bc4, the Bishop's Gambit. It develops the knight and prevents 3...Qh4+. Black's two main approaches are to attempt to hold on to the pawn with ...g5, sometimes after preparing the move with ...h6, or to return the pawn with an early ...d5 in order to facilitate development. These two strategies can also be combined.

Although Black usually accepts the gambit pawn, two methods of declining the gambit, the Classical Defense (2...Bc5) and the Falkbeer Countergambit (2...d5), are also popular.

=== Classical Variation: 3.Nf3 g5 ===
The Classical Variation arises after 3.Nf3 g5. Black defends the f4-pawn, and threatens to kick the f3-knight with ...g4, or else to consolidate with ...Bg7 and ...h6. The main continuations traditionally have been 4.h4 and 4.Bc4. 4.h4 immediately undermines Black's attempts to set up a pawn chain, defends against the potential threat of ...Qh4+ and practically forces 4...g4, usually leading to the Kieseritzky Gambit. 4.Bc4 is usually played with intention of playing a Muzio Gambit after 4...g4 5.0-0!; however, Black has the option of consolidating the pawn chain with 4...Bg7, intending ...h6 and ...d6. More recently, 4.Nc3 (the Quaade Gambit) has been recommended by Scottish grandmaster John Shaw as a less explored alternative to 4.h4 and superior to 4.Bc4.

==== Kieseritzky Gambit: 4.h4 g4 5. Ne5 ====
Position: a8 black rook, b8 black knight, c8 black bishop, d8 black queen, e8 black king, f8 black bishop, g8 black knight, h8 black rook, a7 black pawn, b7 black pawn, c7 black pawn, d7 black pawn, f7 black pawn, h7 black pawn, e5 white knight, e4 white pawn, f4 black pawn, g4 black pawn, h4 white pawn, a2 white pawn, b2 white pawn, c2 white pawn, d2 white pawn, g2 white pawn, a1 white rook, b1 white knight, c1 white bishop, d1 white queen, e1 white king, f1 white bishop, h1 white rook

Kieseritzky Gambit, 4.h4 g4 5.Ne5

With 4.h4 White practically forces 4...g4, thereby undermining any attempt by Black to set up a stable pawn chain with ...h6 and ...Bg7.

The Kieseritzky Gambit, 4.h4 g4 5.Ne5, is considered by modern writers such as Shaw and Gallagher to be the main line after 3...g5. It was popularized by Lionel Kieseritzky in the 1840s and used successfully by Wilhelm Steinitz. Boris Spassky used it to beat Bobby Fischer in a famous game at Mar del Plata in 1960. The main line of the Kieseritzky Gambit is considered to be 5...Nf6 (Berlin Defense) 6.Bc4 d5 7.exd5 Bd6 8.d4 Nh5 9.0-0 Qxh4 10.Qe1 Qxe1 11.Rxe1 0-0 12.Bb3 Bf5. The Long Whip Variation, 5...h5?! 6.Bc4 Rh7 (or 6...Nh6) is considered old-fashioned and risky, as Black loses a lot of time attempting to hold on to the pawn.

==== Allgaier Gambit: 4.h4 g4 5.Ng5 ====
5.Ng5 commits to sacrificing the knight on f7, as the white knight is trapped and has no safe squares to retreat to after 5...h6.

Position: a8 black rook, b8 black knight, c8 black bishop, d8 black queen, e8 black king, f8 black bishop, g8 black knight, h8 black rook, a7 black pawn, b7 black pawn, c7 black pawn, d7 black pawn, f7 black pawn, h7 black pawn, g5 white knight, e4 white pawn, f4 black pawn, g4 black pawn, h4 white pawn, a2 white pawn, b2 white pawn, c2 white pawn, d2 white pawn, g2 white pawn, a1 white rook, b1 white knight, c1 white bishop, d1 white queen, e1 white king, f1 white bishop, h1 white rook

Allgaier Gambit, 4.h4 g4 5.Ng5

The gambit now called the Allgaier was first mentioned by the Italian chess player Domenico Lorenzo Ponziani in his book The incomparable game of chess. In George Walker's A Selection of Games at Chess Actually Played by Philidor and His Contemporaries there were some games included between Bruhl and an English player named Cotter. So for a while, this opening used to be called the "Cotter Gambit".

Johann Baptist Allgaier published more thorough analysis on 5.Ng5 in the 1819 edition of Neue theoretisch-praktische Anweisung zum Schachspiel (New theoretical-practical instruction on the game of chess). According to modern theory, however, this knight sacrifice is unsound.

==== Muzio Gambit and others: 4.Bc4 g4 ====
Position: a8 black rook, b8 black knight, c8 black bishop, d8 black queen, e8 black king, f8 black bishop, g8 black knight, h8 black rook, a7 black pawn, b7 black pawn, c7 black pawn, d7 black pawn, f7 black pawn, h7 black pawn, c4 white bishop, e4 white pawn, f4 black pawn, g4 black pawn, f3 white knight, a2 white pawn, b2 white pawn, c2 white pawn, d2 white pawn, g2 white pawn, h2 white pawn, a1 white rook, b1 white knight, c1 white bishop, d1 white queen, f1 white rook, g1 white king

Muzio Gambit, 4.Bc4 g4 5.0-0

The extremely sharp Muzio Gambit arises after 4.Bc4 g4 5.0-0 gxf3 6.Qxf3, where White has sacrificed a knight but has three pieces bearing down on f7. Such wild play is rare in modern chess, but Black must defend accurately. Perhaps the sharpest continuation is the Double Muzio after 6...Qf6 7.e5 Qxe5 8.Bxf7+!?, leaving White two pieces down in eight moves, but with a position that some masters consider to be equal. In practice White's play seems to be easier, especially when the opponent is surprised by such daring tactics.

Similar lines are the Ghulam Kassim Gambit, 4.Bc4 g4 5.d4, and the McDonnell Gambit, 4.Bc4 g4 5.Nc3. These are generally considered inferior to the Muzio, which has the advantage of reinforcing White's attack along the f-file. Also inferior is the Lolli Gambit, also known as the Wild Muzio Gambit, 4.Bc4 g4 5.Bxf7+?!, which leaves White with insufficient compensation for the piece after 5...Kxf7 6.Ne5+ Ke8 7.Qxg4 Nf6 8.Qxf4 d6.

The Salvio Gambit, 4.Bc4 g4 5.Ne5 Qh4+ 6.Kf1, is considered better for Black due to the insecurity of White's king. Black may play safely with 6...Nh6 (Silberschmidt Variation), or counter-sacrifice with 6...f3 (Cochrane Gambit) or 6...Nc6 (Viennese Variation).

==== Hanstein Gambit and Philidor Gambit: 4.Bc4 Bg7 ====
A safer alternative to 4...g4 is 4...Bg7, which usually leads to the Hanstein Gambit after 5.d4 d6 6.0-0 h6 or the Philidor Gambit after 5.h4 h6 6.d4 d6 (other move orders are possible in both cases).

==== Quaade Gambit: 4.Nc3 ====
The Quaade Gambit (3.Nf3 g5 4.Nc3) is named after a Danish amateur who discussed it in correspondence with the Deutsche Schachzeitung in the 1880s. The move has received renewed attention following its recommendation by John Shaw in his 2013 book on the King's Gambit. A well-known trap here is 4...g4 5.Ne5 Qh4+ 6.g3 fxg3 7.Qxg4 g2+? (7...Qxg4 8.Nxg4 d5 is about equal) 8.Qxh4 gxh1=Q 9.Qh5! and White is close to winning. (Black's best defense is considered 9...Nh6 10.d4 d6 11.Bxh6 dxe5 12.Qxe5+ Be6 13.Qxh8 Nd7 14.Bxf8 0-0-0 and White will emerge a clear pawn ahead.) Instead, 4...Bg7 has been recommended. 4...d6 and 4...h6 transpose to Fischer's Defense and Becker's Defense, respectively. Also possible is 4...Nc6, recommended by Konstantin Sakaev.

After 4...Bg7 5.d4 g4, Simon Williams advocates 6.Bxf4 gxf3 in his DVD and Chess.com video series. White is down a knight, but has a strong attack. The Quaade Gambit has recently been advocated by Daniel King in his PowerPlay series for Chessbase.

==== Rosentreter Gambit: 4.d4 ====
This is likely to lead to similar positions to the Quaade Gambit; however, 4...g4 5.Ne5 Qh4+ 6.g3 fxg3 7.Qxg4 g2+!? (7...Qxg4=) is now viable due to the threat against the pawn on e4. After 8.Qxh4 gxh1=Q Shaw recommends 9.Nc3 for White, with a complicated position.

=== Fischer Defense: 3...d6 ===
Position: a8 black rook, b8 black knight, c8 black bishop, d8 black queen, e8 black king, f8 black bishop, g8 black knight, h8 black rook, a7 black pawn, b7 black pawn, c7 black pawn, f7 black pawn, h7 black pawn, d6 black pawn, d4 white pawn, e4 white pawn, f4 black pawn, g4 black pawn, h4 white pawn, a2 white pawn, b2 white pawn, c2 white pawn, g2 white pawn, a1 white rook, b1 white knight, c1 white bishop, d1 white queen, e1 white king, f1 white bishop, g1 white knight, h1 white rook

Fischer Defense, main line, 4.d4 g5 5.h4 g4 6.Ng1

The Fischer Defense (3.Nf3 d6), although previously known, was advocated by Bobby Fischer after he was defeated by Boris Spassky in a Kieseritzky Gambit at the 1960 Mar del Plata tournament. Fischer then decided to refute the King's Gambit, and the next year the American Chess Quarterly published his analysis of 3...d6, which he called "a high-class waiting move" and claimed the gambit "loses by force".

White usually responds with 4.Bc4 or 4.d4. In the line 4.d4 g5 5.h4 g4, White cannot continue with 6.Ne5 as in the Kieseritzky Gambit, 6.Ng5 is unsound because of 6...f6! trapping the knight, and 6.Nfd2 blocks the bishop on c1. This leaves the move 6.Ng1 as the only option, resulting in a position where neither side has developed a piece on the sixth move. The resulting slightly odd position offers White good attacking chances. A typical continuation is 6.Ng1 Bh6 7.Ne2 Qf6 8.Nbc3 c6 9.g3 f3 10.Nf4 Qe7 "and White has good prospects in the center (Bhend)."

If White plays 4.Bc4, play often continues 4...h6 5.d4 g5 6.0-0 Bg7, transposing into the Hanstein Gambit, which can also be reached via 3...g5 or 3...h6. Another reasonable reply is 4...Be6. If Black plays 4...g5?, White can respond with 5.h4! and Black has no good way to defend the pawn. If 5...g4 6.Ng5 Nh6 7.d4 f6 8.Bxf4! (Morphy–Tilghman, Philadelphia 1859), and if 8...fxg5 9.Bxg5 Qd7 10.0-0 White has an overwhelming attack.

Another option for White after 4.Bc4 h6 is 5.h4, preventing ...g5 but weakening the g3- and g4-squares.

=== Becker Defense: 3...h6 ===
Position: a8 black rook, b8 black knight, c8 black bishop, d8 black queen, e8 black king, g8 black knight, h8 black rook, a7 black pawn, b7 black pawn, c7 black pawn, f7 black pawn, g7 black bishop, d6 black pawn, h6 black pawn, g5 black pawn, d4 white pawn, e4 white pawn, c3 white knight, f3 white knight, g3 white pawn, a2 white pawn, b2 white pawn, c2 white pawn, a1 white rook, c1 white bishop, d1 white queen, e1 white king, f1 white bishop, h1 white rook

Becker Defense, main line, 4.d4 g5 5.Nc3 Bg7 6.g3 fxg3 7.hxg3 d6

The Becker Defense (3.Nf3 h6) has the idea of creating a pawn chain on h6, g5, f4 to defend the f4 pawn while avoiding the Kieseritzky Gambit, so Black will not be forced to play ...g4 when White plays to undermine the chain with h4. The main line is 4.d4 g5, usually followed by 5.Nc3, 5.g3, 5.h4, or 5.Bc4. 4.Nc3 usually transposes to this line after 4...g5 5.d4. but there are independent lines. White also has the option of 4.b3, intending a queenside fianchetto.

Transpositions to lines of the Classical Variation and Fischer Defense are common. For example, after 4.d4 g5 5.Bc4 Bg7 6.0-0, the position is a common line of Hanstein Gambit, which is more commonly reached by 3...g5 4.Bc4 Bg7 5.0-0 (typically followed by 5...d6 6.d4 or 5...h6 6.d4). Similarly, 4.d4 g5 5.Nc3 Bg7 6.Bc4 d6 reaches a line of the Philidor Gambit. 4.Bc4 most often transposes to the Fischer Defense after 4...d6 (or later on, such as after 4...g5 5.d4 d6).

The most notable independent line of the Becker Defense, rarely reached by transposition, is 4.d4 g5 5.Nc3 Bg7 6.g3 fxg3 7.hxg3 d6 (or 5...d6 and 7...Bg7, and other orders). In most other lines where White plays g3, ...fxg3 would allow White to simultaneously capture a pawn, develop a piece, and attack Black's queen by playing Bxg5, but this is prevented by the pawn on h6 in the Becker Defense.

=== Modern Defense: 3...d5 ===
Position: a8 black rook, b8 black knight, c8 black bishop, d8 black queen, e8 black king, f8 black bishop, h8 black rook, a7 black pawn, b7 black pawn, c7 black pawn, f7 black pawn, g7 black pawn, h7 black pawn, f6 black knight, d5 white pawn, f4 black pawn, f3 white knight, a2 white pawn, b2 white pawn, c2 white pawn, d2 white pawn, g2 white pawn, h2 white pawn, a1 white rook, b1 white knight, c1 white bishop, d1 white queen, e1 white king, f1 white bishop, h1 white rook

Modern Defense, main line, 4.exd5 Nf6

The Modern Defense, also known as the Abbazia Defense, (3.Nf3 d5) has much the same idea as the Falkbeer Countergambit, from which it may be reached by transposition after 2...d5 3.exd5 exf4 4.Nf3. Black concentrates on gaining piece play and fighting for the initiative rather than keeping the extra pawn. It has been recommended by several publications as an easy way to equalize and was once seen as a critical line, although White's extra central pawn and piece activity is considered to yield a slight advantage.

The most common continuation is 4.exd5 Nf6, with Black threatening White's pawn. White usually counterattacks with 5.Bb5+. The continuation 5...c6 6. dxc6 bxc6 7.Bc4 Nd5 is known as the Botvinnik Variation. Otherwise, White usually defends the pawn with 5.c4, 5.Bc4, or 5.Nc3. Black sometimes instead plays 4...Qxd5 (resembling the Scandinavian Defense), 4...Bd6, or 4...c6.

=== Cunningham Defense: 3...Be7 ===
The Cunningham Defense (3.Nf3 Be7) threatens a check on h4 that can permanently prevent White from castling; furthermore, if White does not immediately develop the king's bishop, Ke2 would be forced, which hems the bishop in. A sample line is 4.Nc3 Bh4+ 5.Ke2 d5 6.Nxd5 Nf6 7.Nxf6+ Qxf6 8.d4 Bg4 9.Qd2. White has strong central control with pawns on d4 and e4, while Black is relying on the White king's discomfort to compensate.

Position: a8 black rook, b8 black knight, c8 black bishop, d8 black queen, e8 black king, g8 black knight, h8 black rook, a7 black pawn, b7 black pawn, c7 black pawn, d7 black pawn, f7 black pawn, g7 black pawn, h7 black pawn, c4 white bishop, e4 white pawn, f4 black pawn, h4 black bishop, f3 white knight, a2 white pawn, b2 white pawn, c2 white pawn, d2 white pawn, g2 white pawn, h2 white pawn, a1 white rook, b1 white knight, c1 white bishop, d1 white queen, f1 white king, h1 white rook

Cunningham Defense, main line, 4.Bc4 Bh4+ 5.Kf1

To avoid having to play Ke2, 4.Bc4 is White's most popular response. This line is also frequently reached from the Bishop's Gambit. Black can play 4...Bh4+ anyway, forcing 5.Kf1 (or else the wild Bertin Gambit or Three Pawns' Gambit, 5.g3 fxg3 6.0-0 gxh2+ 7.Kh1, played in the nineteenth century). In modern practice, it is common for Black to simply develop instead with 4...Nf6 5.e5 Ng4, known as the Modern Cunningham. An underexplored but seemingly playable line here is 5...Ne4!?, the Euwe Variation, which has a number of trappy ideas.

=== Schallopp Defense: 3...Nf6 ===
Position: a8 black rook, b8 black knight, c8 black bishop, d8 black queen, e8 black king, f8 black bishop, h8 black rook, a7 black pawn, b7 black pawn, c7 black pawn, d7 black pawn, f7 black pawn, g7 black pawn, h7 black pawn, e5 white pawn, h5 black knight, f4 black pawn, f3 white knight, a2 white pawn, b2 white pawn, c2 white pawn, d2 white pawn, g2 white pawn, h2 white pawn, a1 white rook, b1 white knight, c1 white bishop, d1 white queen, e1 white king, f1 white bishop, h1 white rook

Schallopp Defense, main line, 4.e5 Nh5

The Schallopp Defense (3.Nf3 Nf6) is usually played with the intention of defending the pawn on f4 with ...Nh5. While it is not Black's most popular option, it has received increased interest in the 21st century, particularly in 2020, when Ding Liren used it to beat Magnus Carlsen in the online Magnus Carlsen Invitational tournament. The undefended knight on h5 means Black must be careful: for example 4.e5 Nh5 5.d4 d6 6.Qe2 Be7? (correct is 6...d5!=) 7.exd6 Qxd6 8.Qb5+ wins the h5-knight.

The most common continuation is 4.e5 Nh5, often continuing with 5.d4. Also common is 4.Nc3, defending the pawn on e4 and allowing Black's knight to remain on f6. Black most often responds with 4...d5. White often responds with either 5.e5, usually continuing 5...Nh5 or 5...Ne4, or 5.exd5, transposing to the Abbazia Defense.

=== Other third moves for Black ===
- The Bonch-Osmolovsky Defense (3...Ne7) aims to defend the f4-pawn with ...Ng6, a relatively safe square for the knight compared to the Schallopp Defense. It was played by Mark Bluvshtein to defeat former world title finalist Nigel Short at Montreal 2007, even though it has never been highly regarded by theory.
- The MacLeod Defense (3...Nc6) is named after Nicholas MacLeod. Joe Gallagher writes that 3.Nf3 Nc6 "has never really caught on, probably because it does nothing to address Black's immediate problems." Like Fischer's Defense, it is a waiting move. An obvious drawback is that the knight on c6 may prove a target for the d-pawn later in the opening.
- The Wagenbach Defense (3...h5) is named after János Wagenbach (1936–2026). John Shaw writes: "If given the time, Black intends to seal up the kingside with ...h4 followed by ...g5, securing the extra pawn on f4 without allowing an undermining h2–h4. The drawback is of course the amount of time required".
- The Gianutio Countergambit (3...f5) has a similar idea to the Adelaide Countergambit.

=== Bishop's Gambit: 3.Bc4 ===
Position: a8 black rook, b8 black knight, c8 black bishop, d8 black queen, e8 black king, f8 black bishop, g8 black knight, h8 black rook, a7 black pawn, b7 black pawn, c7 black pawn, d7 black pawn, f7 black pawn, g7 black pawn, h7 black pawn, c4 white bishop, e4 white pawn, f4 black pawn, a2 white pawn, b2 white pawn, c2 white pawn, d2 white pawn, g2 white pawn, h2 white pawn, a1 white rook, b1 white knight, c1 white bishop, d1 white queen, e1 white king, g1 white knight, h1 white rook

Bishop's Gambit: 3.Bc4

Of the alternatives to 3.Nf3, the most important is the Bishop's Gambit, 3.Bc4. White allows 3...Qh4+ 4.Kf1, losing the right to castle, but this loses time for Black after the inevitable Nf3 and White will develop rapidly. White also has the option of delaying Nf3, however, and can instead play g3, after which the game becomes quite sharp, with White having the option of Qf3 with an attack on f7, or Kg2 threatening hxg3 (if Black has played ...g5, this is the McDonnell Attack). This idea is advocated, among others, by GM Simon Williams. Despite these counterattacking ideas, 3...Qh4+ is still popular and has made a resurgence in the 21st century. 4...d6, the Cozio Variation, has become highly regarded.

Korchnoi and Zak recommend as best for Black 3...Nf6 4.Nc3 c6, or the alternative move order 3...c6 4.Nc3 Nf6, leading to the Bogoljubov (or Jaenisch) Variation. The main line continues 5.Bb3 d5 6.exd5 cxd5 7.d4 Bd6 8.Nge2. Black's other main option is 3...d5, the Bledow Variation, returning the pawn immediately. Play might continue 4.Bxd5 Nf6 5.Nc3 Bb4 6.Nf3 Bxc3 7.dxc3 c6 8.Bc4 Qxd1+ 9.Kxd1 0-0 10.Bxf4 Nxe4 with an equal position (Bilguer Handbuch, Korchnoi/Zak).

3...Nc6, the Maurian Defense, has become better regarded over time, but if White plays 4.Nf3, Black can transpose into the Hanstein Gambit after 4...g5 5.d4 Bg7 6.c3 d6 7.0-0 h6 (Neil McDonald, 1998). It also often transposes to the Cozio Variation. John Shaw wrote that 3...Nc6 is a "refutation" of the Bishop's Gambit, as he says that Black is better in all variations.

Steinitz's 3...Ne7 and the countergambit 3...f5 (best met by 4.Qe2!) are generally considered inferior. Black may offer transposition to the Fischer Defense with 3...d6, but White most often declines to play 4.Nf3. Instead, most common is 4.d4, allowing the Qh4+ threat to remain for longer.

=== Other third moves for White ===
Some rarely played third-move alternatives for White are:

- 3.Nc3 (Mason Gambit or Keres Gambit)
- 3.d4 (Villemson Gambit or Steinitz Gambit)
- 3.Be2 (Lesser Bishop's Gambit or Tartakower Gambit)
- 3.Qf3 (Breyer Gambit or Hungarian Gambit)
- 3.Qe2 (Basman Gambit)
- 3.g3 (Gama Gambit)
- 3.h4 (Stamma Gambit)
- 3.Nh3 (Eisenberg Gambit)
- 3.Kf2?! (The Tumbleweed)

== King's Gambit Declined ==
Black can decline the offered pawn, or offer a countergambit.

=== Falkbeer Countergambit: 2...d5 ===
Position: a8 black rook, b8 black knight, c8 black bishop, d8 black queen, e8 black king, f8 black bishop, g8 black knight, h8 black rook, a7 black pawn, b7 black pawn, c7 black pawn, f7 black pawn, g7 black pawn, h7 black pawn, d5 black pawn, e5 black pawn, e4 white pawn, f4 white pawn, a2 white pawn, b2 white pawn, c2 white pawn, d2 white pawn, g2 white pawn, h2 white pawn, a1 white rook, b1 white knight, c1 white bishop, d1 white queen, e1 white king, f1 white bishop, g1 white knight, h1 white rook

Falkbeer Countergambit, 2.f4 d5

The Falkbeer Countergambit is named after the 19th-century Austrian master Ernst Falkbeer. It begins 1.e4 e5 2.f4 d5. White usually plays 3.exd5 in response, as 3.fxe5 Qh4+ 4.g3 Qxe4+ wins White's rook. In the traditional line, Black plays 3...e4, sacrificing a pawn in return for quick and easy development. It was once considered good for Black and scored well, but White obtains some advantage with the response 4.d3!, and the line fell out of favor after the 1930s. If Black plays 3...exf4 instead, this transposes to the Modern Variation of KGA. White can also play 3.Nf3 instead of 3.exd5, known as the Blackburne Attack, whose typical continuation is 3...dxe4 4.Nxe5.

Position: a8 black rook, b8 black knight, c8 black bishop, d8 black queen, e8 black king, f8 black bishop, g8 black knight, h8 black rook, a7 black pawn, b7 black pawn, f7 black pawn, g7 black pawn, h7 black pawn, c6 black pawn, d5 white pawn, e5 black pawn, f4 white pawn, a2 white pawn, b2 white pawn, c2 white pawn, d2 white pawn, g2 white pawn, h2 white pawn, a1 white rook, b1 white knight, c1 white bishop, d1 white queen, e1 white king, f1 white bishop, g1 white knight, h1 white rook

Nimzowitsch Countergambit, 2.f4 d5 3.exd5 c6

A more modern alternative in the Falkbeer is 3...c6, the Nimzowitsch Countergambit, also known for being played by Frank Marshall. Black aims for early piece activity instead of holding on to pawns. However, in addition to being returned the gambited pawn, White has a better pawn structure and prospects for a better endgame. The main line continues 4.Nc3 exf4 5.Nf3 Bd6 6.d4 Ne7 7.dxc6 Nbxc6, giving positions analogous to the Modern Variation. Another common move for White is 4.Qe2, dealing with the latent threat of Qh4+ and preventing 4...exf4 due to the pin on Black's king.

=== Classical Defense: 2...Bc5 ===
Position: a8 black rook, b8 black knight, c8 black bishop, d8 black queen, e8 black king, g8 black knight, h8 black rook, a7 black pawn, b7 black pawn, c7 black pawn, f7 black pawn, g7 black pawn, h7 black pawn, d6 black pawn, c5 black bishop, e5 black pawn, e4 white pawn, f4 white pawn, f3 white knight, a2 white pawn, b2 white pawn, c2 white pawn, d2 white pawn, g2 white pawn, h2 white pawn, a1 white rook, b1 white knight, c1 white bishop, d1 white queen, e1 white king, f1 white bishop, h1 white rook

King's Gambit Declined, Classical, main line, 2.f4 Bc5 3.Nf3 d6

A common way to decline the gambit is with 2...Bc5, the "classical" KGD. The bishop prevents White from castling and is such a nuisance that White often expends two tempi to eliminate it by means of Nc3–a4, to exchange on c5 or b6, after which White may castle without worry. The line usually continues with 3.Nf3 d6. After this, White commonly plays 4.c3 (intending 5.d4), 4.Bc4, or 4.Nc3.

The line also contains an opening trap for novices: if White continues with 3.fxe5?? Black continues 3...Qh4+, in which either the rook is lost (4.g3 Qxe4+, forking the rook and king) or White is checkmated (4.Ke2 Qxe4#). This line often comes about by transposition from lines of the Vienna Game or Bishop's Opening, when White plays f2–f4 before Nf3.

One rarely seen line is the Rotlewi Countergambit: 3.Nf3 d6 4.b4!?. The idea of the gambit is similar to that seen in the Evans Gambit of the Italian Game. White sacrifices a pawn to try to build a strong center with 4...Bxb4 5.c3 Bc5 (or 5...Ba5) 6.fxe5 dxe5 7.d4. This line is considered slightly dubious, however.

=== Other 2nd moves for Black ===
Position: a8 black rook, c8 black bishop, d8 black queen, e8 black king, f8 black bishop, g8 black knight, h8 black rook, a7 black pawn, b7 black pawn, c7 black pawn, d7 black pawn, g7 black pawn, h7 black pawn, c6 black knight, e5 black pawn, f5 black pawn, e4 white pawn, f4 white pawn, f3 white knight, a2 white pawn, b2 white pawn, c2 white pawn, d2 white pawn, g2 white pawn, h2 white pawn, a1 white rook, b1 white knight, c1 white bishop, d1 white queen, e1 white king, f1 white bishop, h1 white rook

Adelaide Countergambit, 2.f4 Nc6 3.Nf3 f5

Other options in the KGD are possible, though unusual, such as the Adelaide Countergambit, 2...Nc6 3.Nf3 f5, advocated by Tony Miles and also referred as the Miles Defense; 2...d6 (often reached via 2...Nc6 3.Nf3 d6), which is the way the King’s Gambit was declined the first known time it was played, when after 3.Nf3, best is 3...exf4 transposing to the Fischer Defense (though 2...d6 invites White to play 3.d4 instead); and 2...Nf6 3.fxe5 Nxe4 4.Nf3 Ng5! 5.d4 Nxf3+ 6.Qxf3 Qh4+ 7.Qf2 Qxf2+ 8.Kxf2 with a small endgame advantage, as played in the 1968 game between Bobby Fischer and Bob Wade in Vinkovci. The greedy 2...Qf6 (known as the Nordwalde Variation), intending 3...Qxf4, is considered dubious. Also dubious are the Keene Defense: 2...Qh4+ 3.g3 Qe7 and the Mafia Defense: 1.e4 e5 2.f4 c5.

2...f5?!, the Pantelidakis Countergambit, is among the oldest countergambits in KGD, known from a game published in 1625 by Gioachino Greco. Vincenz Hruby also played it against Mikhail Chigorin in 1882. It is nonetheless considered dubious because 3.exf5 with the threat of Qh5+ gives White a good game. The variation is named after Peter Pantelidakis, an amateur who proposed it in Chess Life and Review.

== Related lines ==
In several lines of the Vienna Game White offers a sort of delayed King's Gambit. After 1.e4 e5 2.Nc3 Nf6 3.f4, Black should reply 3...d5, since 3....exf4?! 4.e5 forces the knight to retreat. Unlike after 2...Nf6 3.f4, 2...Nc6 3.f4 can be met with 3...exf4. White may also offer the gambit in the Bishop's Opening, e.g. 1.e4 e5 2.Bc4 Nc6 3.f4, though this is uncommon.

== ECO ==
The Encyclopaedia of Chess Openings has ten codes for the King's Gambit, C30 through C39.

- C30: 1.e4 e5 2.f4 (King's Gambit)
  - C31: 1.e4 e5 2.f4 d5 (Falkbeer Countergambit)
    - C32: 1.e4 e5 2.f4 d5 3.exd5 e4 4.d3 Nf6 (Morphy, Charousek, etc.)
  - C33: 1.e4 e5 2.f4 exf4 (King's Gambit Accepted)
    - C34: 1.e4 e5 2.f4 exf4 3.Nf3 (King's Knight's Gambit)
      - C35: 1.e4 e5 2.f4 exf4 3.Nf3 Be7 (Cunningham Defense)
      - C36: 1.e4 e5 2.f4 exf4 3.Nf3 d5 (Abbazia Defense)
      - C37: 1.e4 e5 2.f4 exf4 3.Nf3 g5 4.Nc3 /4.Bc4 g4 5.0-0 (Muzio Gambit, etc.)
      - C38: 1.e4 e5 2.f4 exf4 3.Nf3 g5 4.Bc4 Bg7 (Philidor, Hanstein, etc.)
      - C39: 1.e4 e5 2.f4 exf4 3.Nf3 g5 4.h4 (Allgaier, Kieseritzky, etc.)

== Sources ==
- Burgess, Graham (2000). The Mammoth Book of Chess. London: Robinson Publishing. ISBN 978-1-8411-9126-3.
- Collins, Sam (2009). Understanding the Chess Openings. London: Gambit Publications. ISBN 978-1-9046-0028-2.
- Djuric, Stefan; Komarov, Dimitri; Pantaleoni, Claudio (2007). Chess Opening Essentials: Volume 1 – The Complete 1.e4. Brescia: Messaggerie Scacchistiche. ISBN 978-9-0569-1203-1.
- de Firmian, Nick (2008). Modern Chess Openings (15th ed.). New York: Random House. ISBN 978-0-8129-3682-7.
- Gallagher, Joe (1993). Winning With the King's Gambit. New York: Henry Holt. ISBN 0-8050-2631-2.
- Hansen, Carsten (2010). Back to Basics: Openings. Milford, Connecticut: Russell Enterprises. ISBN 978-1-8886-9044-6.
- Hooper, David; Whyld, Kenneth (1996) [First pub. 1992]. The Oxford Companion to Chess (2nd ed.). Oxford: Oxford University Press. ISBN 0-19-866164-9.
- Kasparov, Gary; Keene, Raymond (1982). Batsford Chess Openings. Batsford. pp. 288–89. ISBN 0-7134-2112-6.
- Korchnoi, Victor; Zak, Vladimir Grigor'evich (1974). King's Gambit. Batsford. ISBN 978-0-7134-2914-5.
- Kravtsiv, Martyn (2025). PCO: Practical Chess Openings. London: Everyman Chess. ISBN 978-1-8050-4105-4.
- McDonald, Neil (1998). The King's Gambit. London: Batsford. ISBN 0-7134-8451-9.
- Ristoja, Thomas; Ristoja, Aulikki (1995). Perusteet, Strategia, Taktiikka [Chess: Basics, Strategy, Tactics]. Shakki (in Finnish). Sanoma. ISBN 951-0-20505-2.
- Shaw, John (2013). The King's Gambit. Glasgow: Quality Chess. ISBN 978-1-9065-5271-8.
- van der Sterren, Paul (2009). Fundamental Chess Openings. London: Gambit Publications. ISBN 978-1-9064-5413-5.
- Watson, John (2006). Mastering the Chess Openings. Vol. 1. London: Gambit Publications. ISBN 978-1-9046-0060-2.
