= King's Gambit, Fischer Defense =

Fischer Defense
Position: a8 black rook, b8 black knight, c8 black bishop, d8 black queen, e8 black king, f8 black bishop, g8 black knight, h8 black rook, a7 black pawn, b7 black pawn, c7 black pawn, f7 black pawn, g7 black pawn, h7 black pawn, d6 black pawn, e4 white pawn, f4 black pawn, f3 white knight, a2 white pawn, b2 white pawn, c2 white pawn, d2 white pawn, g2 white pawn, h2 white pawn, a1 white rook, b1 white knight, c1 white bishop, d1 white queen, e1 white king, f1 white bishop, h1 white rook
- Moves: 1.e4 e5 2.f4 exf4 3.Nf3 d6
- ECO: C34
- Origin: 1961, Bobby Fischer
- Named after: Bobby Fischer
- Parent: King's Gambit

The Fischer Defense to the King's Gambit is a chess opening variation that begins with the moves:

1. e4 e5
2. f4 exf4
3. Nf3 d6

Although 3...d6 was previously known, it did not become a major variation until Bobby Fischer advocated it in a famous 1961 article in the first issue of the American Chess Quarterly. By playing this move, Black prevents the e5 square from being occupied by White's knight. This situation occurs in the Kieseritzky Gambit (3.Nf3 g5 4.h4 g4 5.Ne5), a line which Fischer aimed to avoid. White almost always replies with either 4.d4 or 4.Bc4.

In the Encyclopaedia of Chess Openings, the Fischer Defense is given the code C34.

== History ==
After Bobby Fischer lost a 1960 game at Mar del Plata to Boris Spassky, in which Spassky played the Kieseritzky Gambit, Fischer left in tears and promptly went to work at devising a new defense to the King's Gambit. In Fischer's 1961 article, "A Bust to the King's Gambit", he claimed, "In my opinion the King's Gambit is busted. It loses by force." Fischer concluded the article with the famous line, "Of course White can always play differently, in which case he merely loses differently. (Thank you, Weaver Adams!)" The article became famous. Fischer never tested this published analysis as Black in a tournament game; he never again faced the gambit after his 1960 loss to Spassky.

Fischer himself later played the King's Gambit with some success, winning all three tournament games in which he played it. However, he played the Bishop's Gambit (1.e4 e5 2.f4 exf4 3.Bc4) rather than the King's Knight Gambit (3.Nf3), the only line that he analyzed in his article.

== Ideas behind the opening ==
Fischer called 3...d6 "a high-class waiting move". It allows Black to hold the gambit pawn with ...g5 (unless White plays the immediate 4.h4) while avoiding the Kieseritzky Gambit (1.e4 e5 2.f4 exf4 3.Nf3 g5 4.h4 g4 5.Ne5). Fischer asserted that 3...g5 "is inexact because it gives White drawing chances" after 4.h4 g4 5.Ne5 Nf6 6.d4 d6 7.Nd3 Nxe4 8.Bxf4 Bg7 9.c3! (improving on Spassky's 9.Nc3) Qe7 10.Qe2 Bf5 11.Nd2, which, according to Fischer, "leads to an ending where Black's extra pawn is neutralized by White's stranglehold on the dark squares, especially [f4]".

== 4.d4 g5 ==
Position: a8 black rook, b8 black knight, c8 black bishop, d8 black queen, e8 black king, g8 black knight, h8 black rook, a7 black pawn, b7 black pawn, c7 black pawn, f7 black pawn, h7 black pawn, d6 black pawn, h6 black bishop, d4 white pawn, e4 white pawn, f4 black pawn, g4 black pawn, h4 white pawn, a2 white pawn, b2 white pawn, c2 white pawn, g2 white pawn, a1 white rook, b1 white knight, c1 white bishop, d1 white queen, e1 white king, f1 white bishop, g1 white knight, h1 white rook

Fischer Defense, main line, 6.Ng1 Bh6

After 1.e4 e5 2.f4 exf4 3.Nf3 d6 the most common response is 4.d4. This threatens to recapture the gambit pawn with 5.Bxf4, so Black usually responds with 4...g5, the only accurate move. This line is also frequently reached by transposition from the Rosentreter Gambit (3...g5 4.d4).

=== Main line: 5.h4 g4 ===
5...g4 forces the knight to relocate. Fischer analyzed that in the line continuing 6.Ng5 f6 7.Nh3 gxh3 8.Qh5+ Kd7 9.Bxf4 Qe8! 10.Qf3 Kd8, "with King and Queen reversed, Black wins easily". White can try 7.Bxf4, usually continuing 7...fxg5 and 8.hxg5 or 8.Bxg5, gaining a large lead in development, but this is regarded as insufficient compensation for giving up the knight. Black can also instead play 6...h6, which often transposes to a line of the Allgaier Gambit, which is considered unsound for White.

The more common alternative sixth move for White is 6.Ng1. Fischer claimed that White has no compensation after 6...Bh6, but the line 7.Nc3 c6 8.Nge2 Qf6 9.g3 has achieved good results for White. The usual continuations are 9...f3 10.Nf4 and 9...fxg3?! 10.Nxg3 Bxc1 11.Rxc1. Nigel Short used it to defeat Vladimir Akopian in Madrid 1997 in the latter line.

The most common sixth move alternatives for Black are 6...Qf6, most often continuing 7.Nc3 Ne7 8.Nge2 Bh6 and well regarded; 6...Nf6, most often continuing 7.Nc3 Nh5 or 7.Bxf4 Nxe4; and 6...f5, an aggressive and risky line typically continuing 7.Bxf4 fxe5.

=== 5.Nc3 ===
Position: a8 black rook, b8 black knight, c8 black bishop, d8 black queen, e8 black king, g8 black knight, h8 black rook, a7 black pawn, b7 black pawn, c7 black pawn, f7 black pawn, g7 black bishop, h7 black pawn, d6 black pawn, d4 white pawn, e4 white pawn, g4 black pawn, h4 white knight, c3 white knight, e3 white bishop, f3 black pawn, g3 white pawn, a2 white pawn, b2 white pawn, c2 white pawn, h2 white pawn, a1 white rook, d1 white queen, e1 white king, f1 white bishop, h1 white rook

Fischer Defense, 4.d4 g5 5.Nc3 Bg7 6.g3 g4 7.Nh4 f3 8.Be3

A more modern idea is 4.d4 g5 5.Nc3. White intends to leave the bishop on f1 for a while, instead usually attempting to undermine Black's pawn chain on the kingside by playing g3. The variation frequently continues 5...Bg7 6.g3 g4 7.Nh4 f3 8.Be3, with White typically later playing Qd2 and 0-0-0. This line is also frequently reached from the Quaade Gambit (3...g5 4.Nc3).

Black's most common alternative to 5...Bg7 is 5...g4, typically continuing 6.Bxf4 gxf3 7.Qxf3, with White sacrificing a knight for activity. Other possibilities are 5...h6, transposing to the Becker Defense, and 5...Nc6, transposing to a line of the Pierce Gambit of the Vienna Game. It is considered less challenging for White than Black's alternative fifth moves, which are unique to King's Gambit.

=== Other fifth moves for White ===
- 5.g3, which intends 5...g4 6.Nh4 (also common are 5...Bg7 and 5...h6), is another common alternative to the main line, and is essentially an accelerated variant of the line discussed beginning with 5.Nc3.
- 5.Bc4 often transposes to the Hanstein Gambit following 5...Bg7 6.0-0, or the Philidor Gambit following 5...Bg7 6.h4 h6, both of which are more commonly reached from the Classical Defense. Another common transposition is to the line 4.Bc4 h6 5.d4, outlined below.

== 4.Bc4 h6 ==
Position: a8 black rook, b8 black knight, d8 black queen, e8 black king, f8 black bishop, h8 black rook, a7 black pawn, b7 black pawn, c7 black pawn, f7 black pawn, g7 black pawn, d6 black pawn, f6 black knight, h6 black pawn, c4 white bishop, d4 white pawn, e4 white pawn, f4 black pawn, g4 black bishop, h4 white pawn, c3 white knight, f3 white knight, a2 white pawn, b2 white pawn, c2 white pawn, g2 white pawn, a1 white rook, c1 white bishop, d1 white queen, e1 white king, h1 white rook

Fischer Defense, modern line: 4.Bc4 h6 5.h4 Nf6 6.Nc3 Bg4 7.d4

The main alternative to 4.d4 is 4.Bc4, which has become slightly better regarded than 4.d4. By far the most common response is 4...h6, Fischer's recommendation, which he dubbed the "Berlin Defence Deferred". It can also be referred to as the Deferred Becker Defense. Black's third and fourth moves together stop the white knight on f3 from moving to the two dangerous squares e5 and g5.

=== Modern line: 5.h4 Nf6 6.Nc3 ===
5.h4 prevents 5...g5 due to the threat of 6.hxg5 Bg7 (6...hxg5 loses to 7.Rxh8) 7.gxh6 Rxh6, where White regains the gambited pawn by taking advantage of a pin on Black's rook. Because of this difficulty for Black, it has become a well regarded line for White against the Fischer Defense. The usual continuation is 5...Nf6 6.Nc3, with White intending 7.d4. Black often later plays ...Nh5, a similar idea to that seen in the Schallopp Defense (3...Nf6). After 6...Bg4 7.d4, the most common line, the position is regarded as satisfactory for White. Black has sixth move alternatives considered to be slightly stronger: 6...Be7, 6...c6, and 6...Nc6, which usually continues 7.d4 Nh5.

=== 5.d4 g5 ===
Position: a8 black rook, b8 black knight, c8 black bishop, d8 black queen, e8 black king, f8 black bishop, g8 black knight, h8 black rook, a7 black pawn, b7 black pawn, c7 black pawn, f7 black pawn, d6 black pawn, h6 black pawn, g5 black pawn, c4 white bishop, d4 white pawn, e4 white pawn, f4 black pawn, f3 white knight, a2 white pawn, b2 white pawn, c2 white pawn, g2 white pawn, h2 white pawn, a1 white rook, b1 white knight, c1 white bishop, d1 white queen, e1 white king, h1 white rook

4.Bc4 h6 5.d4 g5

5.d4 is White's main alternative to 5.h4. It threatens Bxf4, so Black almost always replies with 5...g5, completing a pawn chain to support the pawn on f4. White often plays 6.0-0, which is considered dubious but still has good attacking chances for White. The line most often continues with 6...Bg7. A better regarded alternative is 6.h4, seeking to undermine the pawn chain immediately. If Black plays 6...Bg7, this transposes to the Philidor Gambit. Further alternatives include 6.Nc3, 6.c3, and 6.g3.

This variation received a high-class examination in a game between two world champions: Boris Spassky vs. Anatoly Karpov. It was played in Hamburg in 1982, in a one-hour-game format in an event called World Cup Chess for West German television. GM Spassky won on time in an ending of Q + N vs Q; White had a satisfactory position from the opening.

=== Other fifth moves for White ===
Several other moves are common. 5.0-0 is the most prominent, and often transposes to the line 5.d4 g5 6.0-0 mentioned earlier. The most common continuation is 5...Nc6 6.d4 g5 (or 5...g5 6.d4 Nc6). 5.Nc3 most often transposes to the 5.d4 lines after 5...g5 6.d4. 5.b3 intends a queenside fianchetto. 5.d3 is playable but passive.

== Other lines ==
White can also play 4.Nc3, typically transposing to the 4.d4 line after 4...g5 5.d4. Other fourth moves for White are extremely rare. A less common alternative to 4.Bc4 h6 for Black is 4...Be6, but it is somewhat passive. Black can also play 4...Be7, entering a line of the Cunningham Defense. Also common is 4...g5?!, with White usually replying 5.h4. 5...h6 enables the same tactic mentioned in the line 4...h6 5.h4, and 5...f6 impedes Black's development.

== See also ==
- List of chess openings
- List of chess openings named after people
