= R.K. Kieseritzky =

Russian and Baltic German chess player

R. K. Kieseritzky (Kieseritzki, Kieseritsky) (c. 1870 – after 1923) was a chess master from the Russian Empire of Baltic-German ethnicity.

He took 11th at Barmen 1905 (Hauptturnier A, Oldřich Duras and Akiba Rubinstein won), competed in the Fifth All-Russian Masters’ Tournament at Lodz 1907/08 (Rubinstein won) and in the Second Winter Tournament of the St. Petersburg Chess Club (Alexander Alekhine won) in April 1912.

After World War I, he tied for seventh in 1920 (Ilya Rabinovich won), and tied for eighth in 1922 (Grigory Levenfish won), both the Petrograd City Chess Championship.

His last recorded game was Abram Rabinovich vs. R.K. Kieseritzky, the First Category Tournament in Petrograd, annotated by Rabinovich and printed in the Shakhmatny Listok 1923, p. 4.
