= Tassilo von Heydebrand und der Lasa =

German chess player (1818–1899)

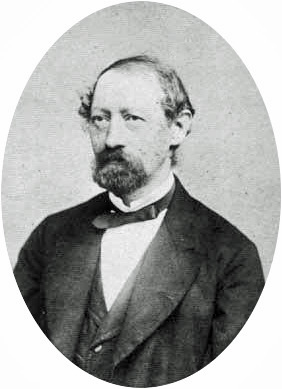

Personal information
- Born: Tassilo, Baron von Heydebrand und der Lasa; 17 October 1818 Berlin, Kingdom of Prussia
- Died: 27 July 1899 (aged 80) Storchnest bei Lissa, German Empire (now Osieczna, Poland)

Chess career
- Country: Germany

Tassilo, Baron von Heydebrand und der Lasa (known in English as Baron von der Lasa; 17 October 1818 – 27 July 1899) was a German chess master, chess historian and theoretician of the nineteenth century, a member of the Berlin Chess Club and a founder of the Berlin Chess School (the Berlin Pleiades).

== Name ==
His name is usually abbreviated as "von der Lasa", as this is how he signed his letters. However both contemporary and more recent writers have used other abbreviations, such as "von Heydebrandt" (which is a misspelling) and "Der Lasa". The Prussian King (later Emperor) William I made a joke out of the confusion by saying, "Good morning, dear Heydebrand. What is von der Lasa doing?"

== Biography ==
Von der Lasa was born 17 October 1818 in Berlin. He studied law in Bonn and Berlin. From 1845 he was a diplomat in the service of Prussia. His career took him to Stockholm, Copenhagen, and Rio de Janeiro, among other places. He retired from the diplomatic service in 1864, and thereafter devoted himself to the world of chess.

He played several matches and defeated the strongest masters in the period 1843–1853. He won against Henry Thomas Buckle 2–1 (1843), Adolf Anderssen 4–2 (1845), Johann Löwenthal 6–1 (1846), John William Schulten 4–1 (1850), Anderssen 10–5 (1851), and Howard Staunton 7–6 (1853). ChessMetrics says that von der Lasa was world #1 for 15 different months between the October 1851 rating list and the December 1852 rating list.

To the modern chess world he is known above all as the main author of the Handbuch des Schachspiels (first published in 1843). His friend Paul Rudolf von Bilguer, responsible for the original plan, had died in 1840, with the work still in the early stages. Von der Lasa took over, and, in a noble gesture of friendship, put his friend's name as author. In later editions of the Handbuch, in German commonly called der Bilguer, von der Lasa was named as co-author.

In 1850 von der Lasa published in the Deutsche Schachzeitung (German Chess Magazine) a call for an international chess tournament, the first ever, to be held in Trier. Instead the first such tournament was held in 1851 in London. Von der Lasa did not play in tournaments, being usually busy as an organizer, but played well in off-hand games against such leading masters as Howard Staunton and Adolf Anderssen. He was also a renowned chess investigator and theoretician, publishing numerous articles in the German Chess Magazine and, in 1897, his great work Zur Geschichte und Literatur des Schachspiels, Forschungen (Researches in the History and Literature of Chess). In the course of his researches he traveled extensively (including a trip around the world in 1887–88) and accumulated a comprehensive chess library, to which he published a catalog in 1896. In 1898 the German Chess Federation saluted his tireless efforts and accomplishments by conferring on him its first honorary membership.

One of von der Lasa's last services was to encourage H. J. R. Murray to pursue further researches into the early history of chess. Von der Lasa died on 27 July 1899 in Storchnest bei Lissa, Posen (then in Prussia, now Osieczna in Poland). His library is still intact at Kórnik Castle near Poznań.
