= Compensation (chess) =

Concept in chess

In chess, compensation is the typically short-term positional advantages a player gains in exchange for typically material disadvantage. Short-term advantages involve initiative and attack.

== Forms ==
Compensation can include:

- Better pawn structure.
- The "two bishops", or "bishop pair", which refers to having bishops of both colors while your opponent does not. Almost all modern players consider having both bishops as an advantage, although historically there has been great debate as to how much of an advantage they constitute. The two bishops are most likely to show their power in the endgame.
- Better piece activity and/or better development (common in gambits).
- Having the enemy king exposed to future attack, either due to a loss of pawn cover or being trapped in the center of the board, is often excellent compensation.
- Passed pawns are often decisive in the endgame. Connected and/or protected passed pawns are even more deadly.
- Control over key squares, diagonals, files, or ranks.

== Examples ==
=== Polugaevsky versus Evans ===
Polugaevsky vs. Evans, 1970

Position: g8 black king, b7 black pawn, d7 white rook, g7 black pawn, a6 black pawn, c6 black pawn, a5 white pawn, f5 black pawn, b4 black rook, e3 white pawn, f2 white king, g2 white pawn, h2 white pawn

White to move, draws

A rook on the seventh rank (the opponent's second rank) is usually very powerful, as it threatens the opponent's unadvanced pawns and hems in the enemy king. A rook on the seventh rank is sufficient compensation for a pawn (Fine & Benko 2003:586). In this position from a game between Lev Polugaevsky and Larry Evans, the rook on the seventh rank enables White to draw, despite being a pawn down (Griffiths 1992:102–3).

=== Spassky versus Fischer ===
Spassky vs. Fischer, 1960

Position: a8 black rook, b8 black knight, c8 black bishop, d8 black queen, e8 black king, f8 black bishop, g8 black knight, h8 black rook, a7 black pawn, b7 black pawn, c7 black pawn, d7 black pawn, f7 black pawn, h7 black pawn, e5 white knight, e4 white pawn, f4 black pawn, g4 black pawn, h4 white pawn, a2 white pawn, b2 white pawn, c2 white pawn, d2 white pawn, g2 white pawn, a1 white rook, b1 white knight, c1 white bishop, d1 white queen, e1 white king, f1 white bishop, h1 white rook

Position after 5.Ne5

Position: a8 black rook, b8 black knight, c8 black bishop, d8 black queen, e8 black king, g8 black knight, a7 black pawn, b7 black pawn, c7 black pawn, f7 black pawn, h7 black rook, d6 black pawn, h6 black bishop, h5 black pawn, c4 white bishop, d4 white pawn, e4 white pawn, f4 white pawn, g4 black pawn, c3 white knight, d3 white knight, e3 white bishop, a2 white pawn, b2 white pawn, c2 white pawn, d2 white king, a1 white rook, d1 white queen, h1 white rook

Position after 13.Nc3

A famous 1960 game between future world champions Boris Spassky and Bobby Fischer began with a King's Gambit opening. White sacrifices a pawn on his second move:

1. e4 e5 2. f4 exf4 3. Nf3 g5 4. h4 g4 5. Ne5

reaching the position shown (first diagram). Fischer examines an alternate fifth move for Black:

5... h5 6. Bc4 Rh7 7. d4 d6 8. Nd3 f3 9. gxf3 Be7 10. Be3 Bxh4+ 11. Kd2 Bg5 12. f4 Bh6 13. Nc3

reaching the position shown (second diagram), where Fischer explains "White has more than enough compensation for the pawn." (Fischer 2008:123)

== The bishop pair ==
Possession of the bishop pair often yields long-term compensation for sacrificed material.

=== Berthelot versus Flear ===
Berthelot vs. Flear, 1988

Position: f8 black king, a7 black pawn, b7 black pawn, c7 black pawn, f7 black pawn, g7 black pawn, h7 black pawn, b6 black bishop, g4 black bishop, c3 white pawn, a2 white pawn, b2 white pawn, g2 white pawn, h2 white pawn, a1 white rook, b1 white knight, e1 white king

Two bishops and a pawn are often sufficient compensation for a rook and knight.

An unbalanced position has arisen straight out of the opening, in which, with an open center, Black has a pawn and the bishop pair for the exchange.

=== Balashov versus Quinteros ===
Balashov vs. Quinteros, 1976

Position: a8 black rook, b8 black knight, b7 black bishop, e7 black king, a6 black pawn, e6 black pawn, f6 black pawn, h6 black bishop, b5 black pawn, g4 black pawn, c3 white knight, a2 white pawn, b2 white pawn, c2 white pawn, g2 white pawn, h2 white pawn, c1 white king, d1 white rook, e1 white knight, h1 white rook

Position after 21...Bh6+. White is up the exchange; Black is compensated by two active bishops.

A relatively interesting middlegame has been reached. White is up the exchange, while Black is compensated by two active bishops forming a crisscross pattern.

== Bishops of opposite colors ==
Example position

Position: a8 black rook, c8 black bishop, d8 black queen, e8 black king, h8 black rook, a7 black pawn, b7 black pawn, f7 black pawn, g7 black pawn, h7 black pawn, d5 black pawn, d4 white knight, e4 black pawn, b3 white pawn, e3 white pawn, a2 white pawn, b2 white bishop, d2 white pawn, f2 white pawn, g2 white pawn, h2 white pawn, d1 white queen, f1 white rook, g1 white king

Opposite-colored bishops and White's knight anchored in the center yield compensation for loss of the exchange. Black is better, but Black's bishop cannot dislodge the white knight from its centralized outpost.

Opposite-colored bishops sometimes give the defender drawing chances in the long run, even if the opponent has a material advantage of one or two pawns or even the exchange.

== See also ==
- Chess piece relative value
- The exchange (chess)
