= Berlin Pleiades =

Group of 19th-century German chess masters

The Berlin Pleiades was a group of seven masters of German chess in the 19th century. They are named after the star constellation the Pleiades.

The members of the Berlin Pleiades were:

- Paul Rudolf von Bilguer (1815–1840), Army Lieutenant and author of the Handbuch des Schachspiels, the most influential chess book for 90 years;
- Dr. Ludwig Bledow (1795–1846), teacher of mathematics and the Pleiades co-founder;
- Wilhelm Hanstein (1811–1850), civil servant;
- Bernhard Horwitz (1807–1885), painter;
- Baron Tassilo von Heydebrand und der Lasa (1818–1899), later became a Prussian diplomat and chess historian;
- Carl Mayet (1810–1868), barrister and judge;
- Carl Schorn (1803–1850), painter.
The Berlin Pleiades

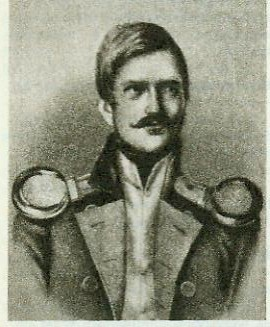
Paul von Bilguer

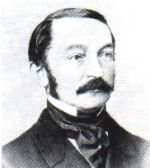
Ludwig Bledow

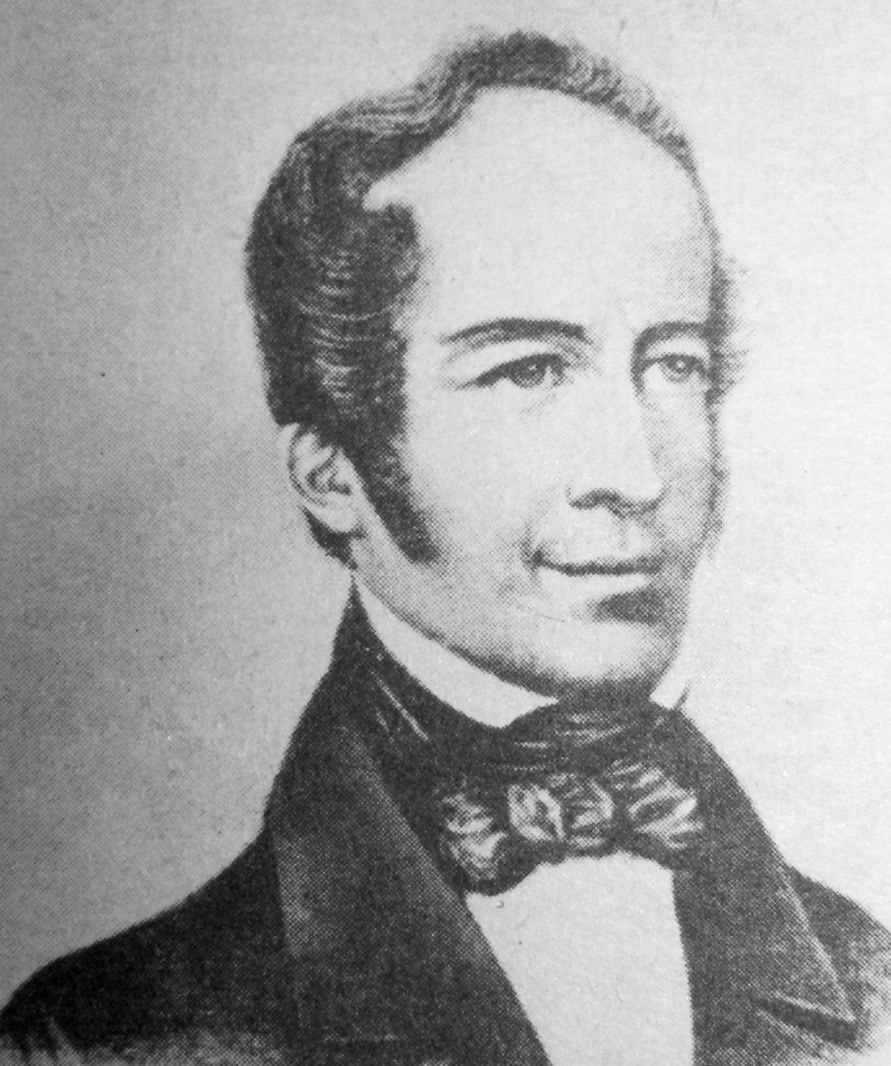
Wilhelm Hanstein

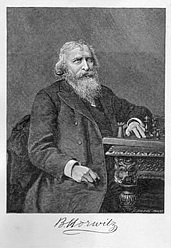
Bernhard Horwitz

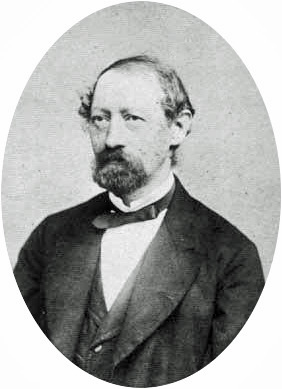
Von der Lasa

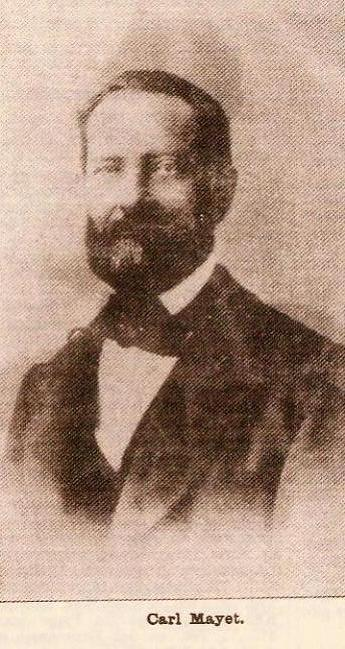
Carl Mayet

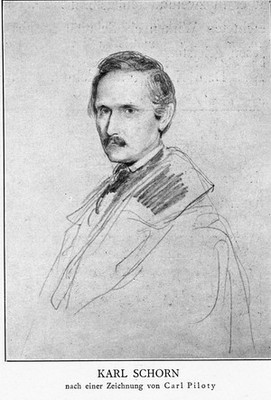
Carl Schorn
