= Lionel Kieseritzky =

Baltic German chess master (1805–1853)

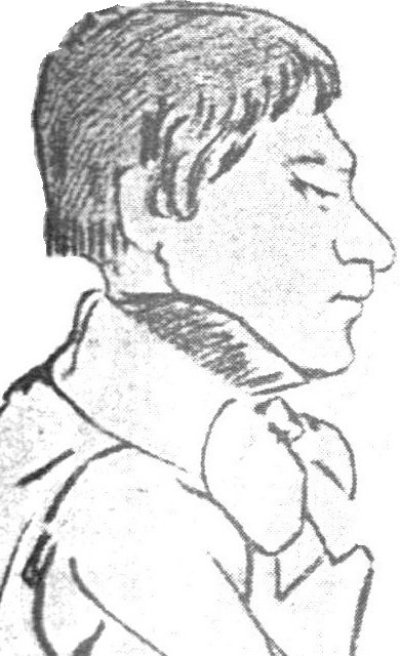

Personal information
- Born: Lionel Adalbert Bagration Felix Kieseritzky; 1 January 1806 Dorpat, Governorate of Livonia, Russian Empire
- Died: 18 May 1853 (aged 47) Paris, France

Chess career
- Country: Russian Empire; France

Lionel Adalbert Bagration Felix Kieseritzky (Russian: Лионель Адальберт Багратион Феликс Кизерицкий; 1 January 1806 [O.S. 20 December 1805] – 18 May [O.S. 6 May] 1853) was a Baltic German chess master and theoretician, known for his contributions to chess theory, as well for a game he lost against Adolf Anderssen, known as the "Immortal Game". Kieseritzky's name became associated with several openings and opening variations, such as the Kieseritzky Gambit, Kieseritzky Attack, and the Boden–Kieseritzky Gambit.

== Early life ==
Kieseritzky was born in Dorpat (now Tartu), Livonia, Russian Empire into a Baltic German family. From 1825 to 1829 he studied at the Imperial University of Dorpat, and then worked as a mathematics teacher, like Anderssen. From 1838 to 1839, he played a correspondence match against Carl Jaenisch – unfinished, because Kieseritzky had to leave for Paris. In Paris he became a chess professional, giving lessons or playing games for five francs an hour, and editing a chess magazine.

== Chess career ==
Kieseritzky became one of the four leading French masters of the time, alongside Louis de la Bourdonnais, Pierre Charles Fournier de Saint-Amant, and Boncourt, and for the few years before his death was among the top several players in the world along with Howard Staunton. In fact, ChessMetrics says he was No. 1 for 23 different months between the September 1849 rating list and the September 1851 rating list.

His knowledge of the game was significant and he made contributions to chess theory, but his career was somewhat blighted by misfortune and a passion for the unsound. In 1842 he tied a match with Ignazio Calvi (+7−7=1). In 1846, he won matches against the German masters Bernhard Horwitz (+7−4=1) and Daniel Harrwitz (+11−5=2). He enjoyed a number of other victories across his career, but his nerve was lacking when it came to tournament play.

He was invited to play in the first international chess tournament, the London 1851 tournament, where he scored ½–2½ and was defeated in the first round by the eventual winner Adolf Anderssen. During his time in London, Kieseritzky also played a casual game against Anderssen which became known as "The Immortal Game". Despite losing, Kieseritzky himself recorded and published the game during his period as editor of La Regence.

Kieseritzky is credited with invention of the first three-dimensional chess, Kubicschach ("Cubic Chess"), in 1851, but this variant failed to attract adherents. The 8×8×8 cube format was later picked up by Dr. Ferdinand Maack in 1907 when developing Raumschach ("Space Chess").

Kieseritzky died in Paris on 18 May 1853. He was buried in a pauper's grave in the city.

== Notable games ==
Shortly before the Immortal Game was played, Kieseritzky played a brief game against Schulten. In this earlier game, he made successful use of the same opening line with which he would later lose to Anderssen. Both games opened identically, through 5...Nf6.

Schulten vs. Kieseritzky, informal game, Paris 1850
1.e4 e5 2.f4 exf4 3.Bc4 Qh4+ 4.Kf1 b5 5.Bxb5 Nf6 6.Nc3 Ng4 7.Nh3 Nc6 8.Nd5 Nd4 9.Nxc7+ Kd8 10.Nxa8 f3! 11.d3 f6 12.Bc4 d5 13.Bxd5 Bd6 14.Qe1? fxg2+ 15.Kxg2 Qxh3+!! 16.Kxh3 Ne3+ 17.Kh4 Nf3+ 18.Kh5 Bg4#

== See also ==
- Bishop's Opening, Berlin Defense
- Boden–Kieseritzky Gambit
- Kieseritzky Gambit
- List of chess games

== Notes ==
=== References ===
- Hooper, David and Kenneth Whyld (1996). The Oxford Companion to Chess. Oxford University. p. 200. ISBN 0-19-280049-3.
- G.H. Diggle (Nov. 1976) "Chess Characters: Reminiscences of a Badmaster". British Chess Federation
- Zagadka Kieseritzky'ego by Tomasz Lissowski and Bartlomiej Macieja, Warsaw 1996
