= Giulio Cesare Polerio =

Italian chess player

Personal information
- Born: c. 1550 Lanciano, Abruzzo Citra, Kingdom of Naples
- Died: c. 1610 Rome, Papal States

Chess career
- Country: Kingdom of Naples

Giulio Cesare Polerio (c. 1555 – c. 1610; reconstruction of places and dates by Adriano Chicco) was an Italian chess theoretician and player.

Name affixes used for him are l'Apruzzese, Giu[o]lio Cesare da Lanciano (Salvio/Walker), and Lancianese, because he was born in Lanciano, a town in the province of Chieti of the region Abruzzo of Italy. He died in Rome.

== Chess playing ==
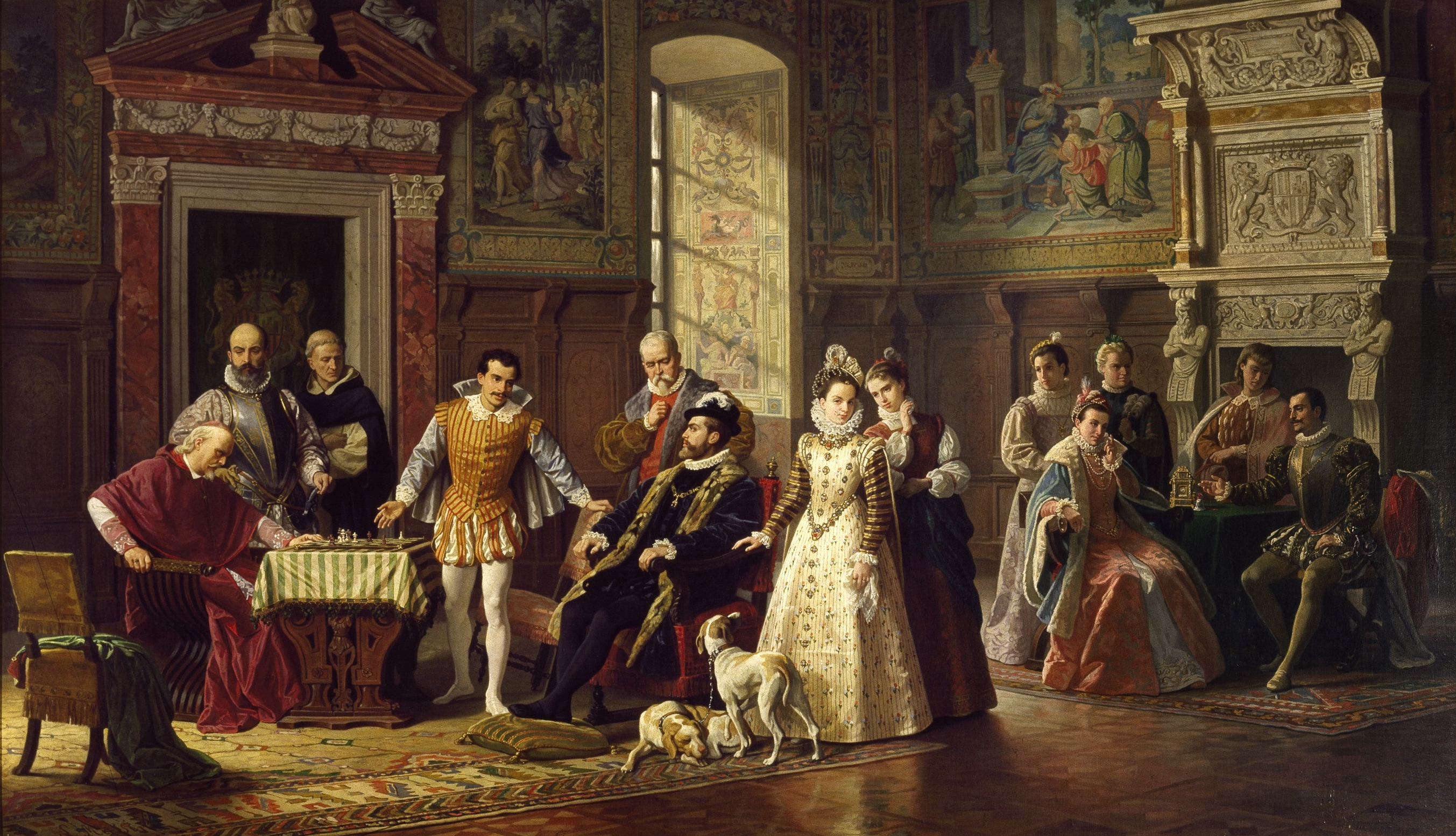
"Sfida scacchistica alla corte del Re di Spagna" showing Giovanni Leonardo ("Il Puttino") at the court of Philip II of Spain, around 1575, painting by Luigi Mussini (1883). Games of Giò Leonardo, including those against Ruy López de Segura, are recorded in the Codexes of Polerio.

The first published mention of Polerio is from 1634 in Il Puttino by Alessandro Salvio. It recounts an event that must have occurred around 1575. "Il Puttino, altramente detto il Cavaliere errante" is a nickname used by Alessandro Salvio for Giovanni Leonardo. According to Salvio, Polerio accompanied Giovanni Leonardo on his way to Madrid until Genoa.

After returning to Rome around 1584, Polerio became a chess player and writer in ordinary of Giacomo Boncompagni, Duke of Sora and son of Pope Gregory XIII (born Ugo Boncompagni).

Polerio wrote a number of codexes in which a lively international chess dialogue is described involving the exchange of ideas among players in Italy, Portugal, and Spain. In these codexes, besides new ideas regarding chess openings, Polerio describes some of his own matches.

In Il Puttino, Salvio mentions that, starting in 1606 from "Città di Piazza", "Geronimo Cascio, on his way to Rome, beat Giulio Cesare (Polerio), companion of Il Puttino, the best in Rome, in the house/court of his Excellence Giacomo Boncompagni, Duke of Sora."

== The Codexes of Giulio Cesare Polerio ==
The first systematic investigation of the Codexes of Polerio was published by Antonius van der Linde in 1874. The subject of the investigations by Van der Linde can be found at the Bibliotheca Van der Linde-Niemeijeriana, part of the Koninklijke Bibliotheek, National Library of the Netherlands.

The current systematics of the Codexes of Polerio has been performed and published by Alessandro Sanvito in 2005.

== Impact of Polerio on chess history and theory (before 1874) ==
The systematic organisation of overall seven Codexes, described and called A-G by Van der Linde, and attributed to Polerio in 1874, had major impact on the further description of chess history, and history of chess theory. A relevant part of the work of Van der Linde was to compare Codexes of Polerio and Gioacchino Greco even superfine. According to this investigation, most of the analytic work of Polerio was mediated outside of Italy, up to 1874, via Gioacchino Greco. More recent work by Peter J. Monté compiling game scores from all sixteenth and seventeenth century manuscripts reveals where Greco copied Polerio and where he carried the games further.

== Impact of Polerio on chess terminology (after 1874) ==
=== Polerio Defense/Polerio's Attack ===
The move 4.Ng5, White's traditional response to the Two Knights Defense, was originated by Polerio in 1580. After the standard 4...d5 5.exd5, the main move 5...Na5 has been called Polerio Defense online, apparently in error, as print sources universally do not use the name, though Polerio's Attack has been used for the 4.Ng5 variation in general. Boris Alterman uses the term Chigorin Gambit for the move 5...Na5; Mikhail Chigorin popularized that move and its continuation 6.Bb5+ c6 7.dxc6 bxc6 in the late 19th century. Tim Harding wrote that the sideline 6...Bd7 (instead of Chigorin's 6...c6) was known to Polerio, who lived when the materialistic 4.Ng5 d5 5.exd5 Nxd5?! was common.

=== Polerio Gambit ===
Position: a8 black rook, b8 black knight, c8 black bishop, d8 black queen, e8 black king, f8 black bishop, g8 black knight, h8 black rook, a7 black pawn, b7 black pawn, c7 black pawn, d7 black pawn, f7 black pawn, h7 black pawn, c4 white bishop, e4 white pawn, f4 black pawn, f3 white queen, a2 white pawn, b2 white pawn, c2 white pawn, d2 white pawn, g2 white pawn, h2 white pawn, a1 white rook, b1 white knight, c1 white bishop, f1 white rook, g1 white king

Position after 1.e4 e5 2.f4 exf4 3.Nf3 g5 4.Bc4 g4 5.0-0! gxf3 6.Qxf3 Position considered as favourable for White by Polerio in 1579/80. Exclamation mark added by van der Linde in 1874 calling this move order Polerio Gambit. Advertised by Sarratt in 1821 as Muzio Gambit.

Position: a8 black rook, b8 black knight, c8 black bishop, d8 black queen, e8 black king, f8 black bishop, g8 black knight, h8 black rook, a7 black pawn, b7 black pawn, c7 black pawn, d7 black pawn, f7 black pawn, h7 black pawn, c4 white bishop, e4 white pawn, f4 black pawn, g4 black pawn, f3 white knight, a2 white pawn, b2 white pawn, c2 white pawn, d2 white pawn, g2 white pawn, h2 white pawn, a1 white rook, b1 white knight, c1 white bishop, d1 white queen, f1 white rook, h1 white king

Position after 1.e4 e5 2.f4 exf4 3.Nf3 g5 4.Bc4 g4 5. "Italian (or free) castling", note the King on h1. Position reached in Cascio–N.N., as reported by Signor Mutio d'Alessandro to Alessandro Salvio and published by Salvio in 1634. See p. 217 ff. of the work of the Opera d'Autore Modenese.

On p. 186 of "Das Schachspiel des XVI. Jahrhunderts" van der Linde wrote in 1874:

"D. Polerio-Gambit

224

"Polerio Gambit: 1. e4 e5 2.f4 exf4 3. Nf3 g5 4.Bc4 g4 5.0-0! gxf3 6.Qxf3 +/−"

Exactly this move order was also found later even in a second Polerio Codex discovered and described by J.A. Leon in 1894. Of note is that the position after 1.e4 e5 2.f4 exf4 3.Nf3 g5 4.Bc4 g4 5.0-0 gxf3 6.Qxf3 may be considered by most recent grandmasters as a forced win for White – provided that 5.0-0 would mean "free castling", i.e. bringing the White King from e1 to h1. Actually, Polerio did claim 5.0-0 gxf3 6.Qxf3 to be favourable for White although the white king of Polerio did stand, after 5.0-0, on h1 but not on g1 (i.e. castling as defined in our days).

However, in 1874, the move order 1.e4 e5 2.f4 exf4 3.Nf3 g5 4.Bc4 g4 5.0-0! was already occupied by the term "Muzio Gambit". This term derives from a translation of a work of Alessandro Salvio, supposedly the third book of the reprint of 1723, by Sarrat in 1813. On page 209 Jacob Henry Sarratt (translated) and wrote:

"SALVIO states that the following Gambit was sent to him by Signor Muzio, ..."

Actually, Alessandro Salvio never stated this. Rather, in the third book of the Il Puttino he wrote that Signor Mutio d'Alessandro did see that Geronimo Cascio did play the move order (with free castling, also called "Italian method" of castling).

With p. 165, vol. 2, of the 1821 edition of A New Treatise of the Game of Chess the term Muzio Gambit was coined by Jacob Henry Sarratt. And with the latter work of Sarrat, in 1821 the modern theory of the "Muzio Gambit" with castling according modern rules started – an idea and a position already Polerio analysed in 1579/80.

Thus, Antonius van der Linde, changed the view on the historical development of the move order 1.e4 e5 2.f4 exf4 3.Nf3 g5 4.Bc4 g4 5.0-0 in 1874, most notably in the last editions of the Handbuch. Thereafter, a trend can be seen to call this move order either with hyphenated terms such as Muzio–Polerio, Polerio–Muzio, or simply Polerio Gambit. Such a terminology is both in honour of Giulio Cesare Polerio and partially misleading since the major body of the theory of this opening was generated in the time span in-between 1821 and 1874. The number of games played by Adolf Anderssen, Paul Morphy, and Wilhelm Steinitz with 1.e4 e5 2.f4 exf4 3.Nf3 g5 4.Bc4 g4 5.0-0 or 5.d4 in the time span 1821–1874 was already rather high. The rules for Chess opening nomenclature, and their historical development, should be taken into account while assessing van der Linde's claim of 1874 "D. Polerio-Gambit".

=== "Polerio Gambits and Variations" ===
In 1874, Van der Linde suggested as well (p. 188) to rename the move order 1.e4 e5 2.f4 exf4 3.Nf3 g5 4.Bc4 Bg7 5.h4 h6 6.d4 d6 7.Nc3 c6 8.hxg5 hxg5 9.Rxh8 Bxh8 10.Ne5!? into "Polerio's second Gambit". This suggestion is based on the observation that "im Handbuch (1864, S.. 366, § 3)" this move order is called "das Gambit des Calabresen". This is a rather interesting observation since in the "Handbuch" in its 2nd edition as of 1852, on p. 205 it is mentioned that the move order 1.e4 e5 2.Bc4 f5 can be found "at the Calabrese". That's a rather wise wording since both 1.e4 e5 2.Bc4 f5 and 1.e4 e5 2.Nf3 f5, according to Codexes of Polerio, occurred in games of "Gio. Leonardo" (games 236–238, p. 190 in van der Linde). Both Giovanni Leonardo and Gioacchino Greco were from Calabria, the first from Cutro, the second from Celico.
