= Ruy López de Segura =

Spanish priest and chess player

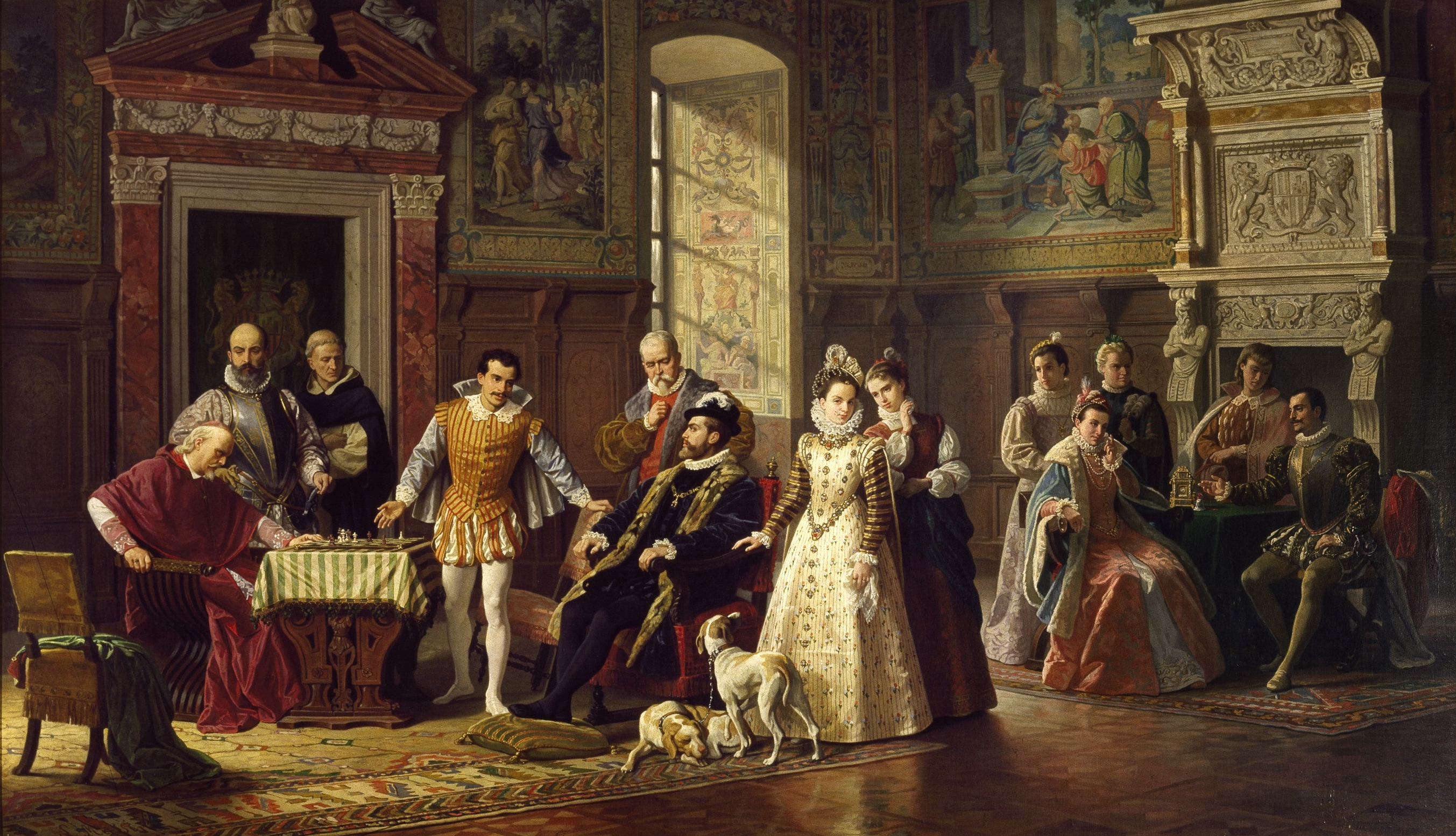
- Ruy López playing Leonardo di Bona in the Spanish royal court; also depicted is King Philip II of Spain. (Luigi Mussini, 1883)

Personal information
- Born: Rodrigo López de Segura c. 1530 Segura
- Died: c. 1580 (aged c. 50)

Chess career
- Country: Spain

Rodrigo "Ruy" López de Segura (c. 1530 – c. 1580) was a Spanish chess player, author, and Catholic priest whose 1561 treatise Libro de la invención liberal y Arte del juego del Axedrez is one of the first books about modern chess in Europe. He made great contributions to chess opening theory, including in the King's Gambit and the Ruy Lopez opening that bears his name. López was also the strongest player in Spain for about 20 years.

== Life ==
López was a native of Segura de León, a town in Extremadura, Spain. In 1559, while living in Zafra, López was called to Rome by Pope Pius IV on ecclesiastical business. During his stay in Rome, López played chess with the locals. He apparently acquitted himself well, although the only account of these games is given in a single sentence by López himself. One of those players was Il Puttino, an epithet for a young Leonardo di Bona. López also learned the term gambit from the Italian players.

In Italy, López encountered Pedro Damiano's treatise on chess, Questo libro e da imparare giocare a scachi et de li partiti, but did not find much value in it. This may have inspired López to write his own book, Libro de la Invencion liberal y Arte del juego del Axedrez, which was published in 1561.

López was the strongest player in Spain for nearly twenty years; his nearest rivals were Alfonso Ceron (of Granada) and Medrano. López and Ceron played before King Philip II of Spain, impressing him enough for López to earn a benefice and a golden chain displaying a rook. López was also esteemed for his ability at blindfold chess.

Alessandro Salvio writes that López travelled to Rome again in 1572. It is more probable, however, that López visited Rome only once (in 1559) and that Salvio's chronology is incorrect.

Around the year 1574, López was still at the royal court in Spain when di Bona, then Paolo Boi, arrived on their tours of Europe. Their meetings – which also included Ceron – are sometimes considered the first international chess tournament. Boi and a much-improved di Bona defeated López and Ceron in Madrid, in the presence of Philip II. López was again able to best Ceron.

The years of López's birth and death can be estimated only very approximately; a lifespan of c. 1530–1580 is commonly given without evidence. He was likely born before 1534 and lived until at least the 1574 contest.

== Legacy ==
Ruy López's contribution to chess was mainly to its opening theory; Peter J. Monté has described him as "the father of opening theory". His analysis of the King's Gambit in particular went well beyond earlier writing such as Damiano's. He also was the strongest player in Spain, and possibly Italy, for about twenty years. As Andrew Soltis describes: "At that time, the best players of modern-rules chess lived in Italy and Iberia. López is believed to have easily beaten the most skilled Italians. He may deserve the title of world champion, but that title did not exist until the late nineteenth century."

López's reputation suffered from the writings of the Modenese Masters. Ponziani described López as unfruitful, unmethodical, and having made little advance on Damiano. H.J.R Murray argues, however, that the Masters' criticism of López is unfair and likely stems from his play's resemblance to Philidor's, who was their school's great rival:

Living before the great rival schools of chess which divided the players of the 18th and early 19th centuries had arisen, López yet belongs essentially to that school of chess which we are accustomed to associate with the name of Philidor. In his analysis, and especially in the games in his second book, we may trace the genesis of that theory of Pawn-play which Philidor reduced to a system two centuries later.

— H.J.R Murray

=== Libro de la Invencion liberal y Arte del juego del Axedrez ===
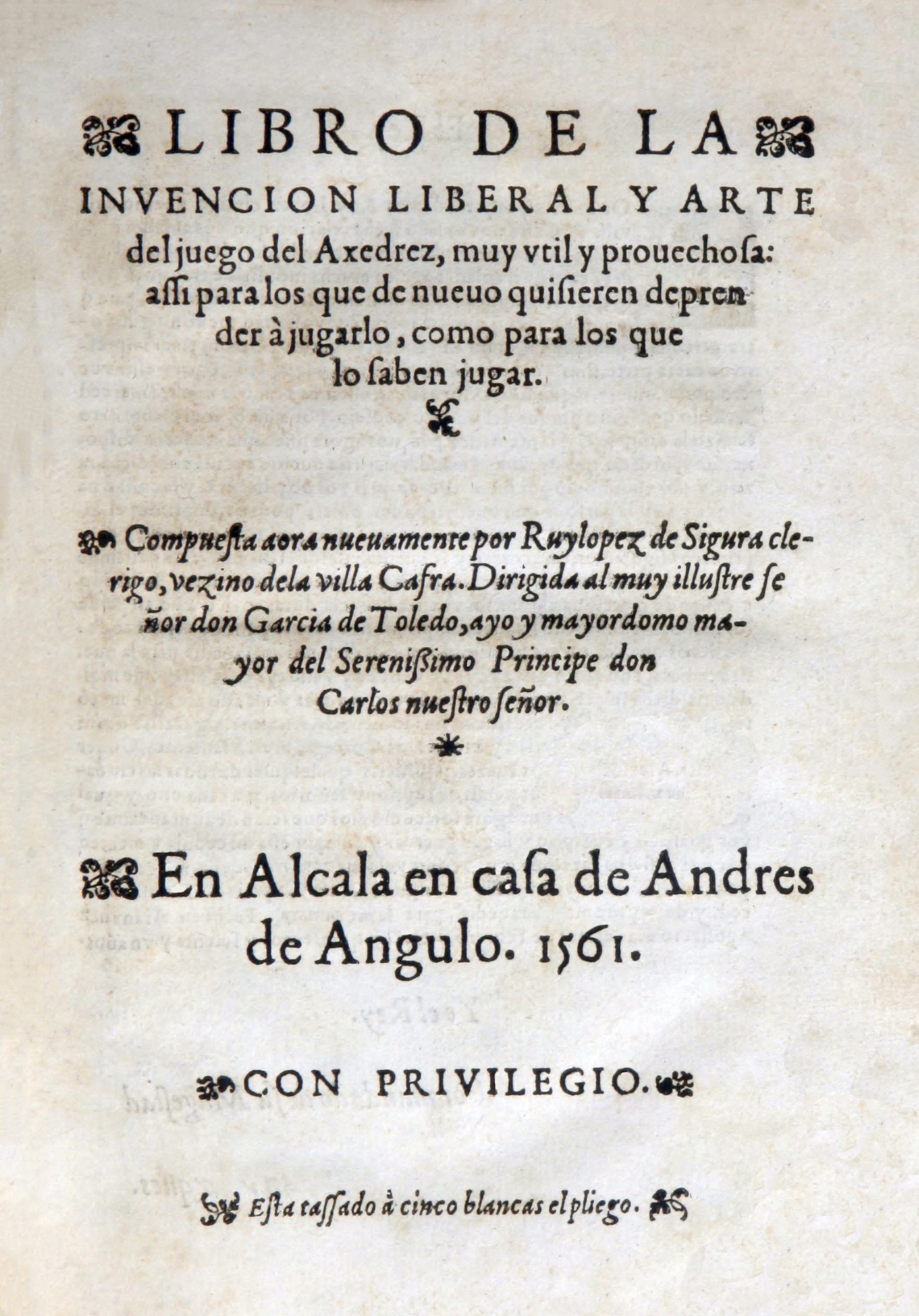
A page of the original 1561 printing of López's book, Libro de la Invencion liberal y Arte del juego del Axedrez

Ruy López's surviving treatise, which is fully titled Libro de la Invencion liberal y Arte del juego del Axedrez, por Ruy-López de Sigura, clerigo, vezino de la villago Cafra. Digirida al muy Illustre Señor Don Garcia de Toledo, ayo y mayordomo del serenissimo principe Don Carlos nuestro Señor., was published in 1561.

López divided his book into four parts ("books"). He first presents several mythological origins of the game, and discusses its benefits, rules, and strategies while interspersing a number of quotes (in Latin) from classical authors. The second part focuses on openings and is López's legacy as "the father of opening theory". Third comes a hostile appraisal of Damiano's opening analysis. López's final chapters are devoted to odds chess, where he again criticises Damiano's approaches to these games.

In this work López presents sixty-six games, of which twenty-four were taken from Damiano's 1512 book. According to J.H. Sarartt, López's games are of a lower quality than those in Damiano's work. He admits that they might nevertheless be more instructive, since López gives a larger number of variations. Other authors have given varying opinions about the quality of López's analysis.

López only rarely presented variations that ended in checkmate. Instead he concluded lines with comments such as how Black must lose his queen, or that White has a very good game.

=== Example games ===
Not many games can be confidently attributed to López, and those that can are incomplete. One such game was recorded by Polerio, and was played during the contests between Italians and Spaniards before King Philip II:

1.e4 e5 2.Nf3 Nc6 3.Bc4 Bc5 4.c3 Qe7 5.b4 Bb6 6.a4 a6 7.Ba3 d6 8.Qe2 Bg4 9.d3 Nf6 10.Nbd2

Among the analysis Ruy López gives in his treatise is an example of the opening that bears his name. López contends that the following line proves Black should avoid the "Ruy López" by playing 2...d6 instead of 2...Nc6.

1.e4 e5 2.Nf3 Nc6 3.Bb5 Bc5 4.c3 d6 5.d4 exd4 6.cxd4 Bb4+ 7.Nc3 Bd7 8.Bf4 Nf6 9.Qd3 Bxc3+ 10.bxc3

López also gives a number of variations of the King's Gambit, such as:

1.e4 e5 2.f4 exf4 3.Nf3 Nf6 4.e5 Qe7 5.Qe2 Nh5 6.Nc3 c6 7.Ne4

=== Openings named for Ruy López ===
Position: a8 black rook, c8 black bishop, d8 black queen, e8 black king, f8 black bishop, g8 black knight, h8 black rook, a7 black pawn, b7 black pawn, c7 black pawn, d7 black pawn, f7 black pawn, g7 black pawn, h7 black pawn, c6 black knight, b5 white bishop, e5 black pawn, e4 white pawn, f3 white knight, a2 white pawn, b2 white pawn, c2 white pawn, d2 white pawn, f2 white pawn, g2 white pawn, h2 white pawn, a1 white rook, b1 white knight, c1 white bishop, d1 white queen, e1 white king, h1 white rook

The Ruy Lopez opening

The following chess openings bear López's name:

- C20 Open Game: Lopez/Mcleod Opening, 1.e4 e5 2.c3
- C23 Bishop's Opening: Lopez Gambit, 1.e4 e5 2.Bc4 Bc5 3.Qe2 Nc6 4.c3 Nf6 5.f4
- C33 KGA: Bishop's Gambit, Ruy Lopez Defence, 1.e4 e5 2.f4 exf4 3.Bc4 c6
- C33 KGA: Bishop's Gambit, Lopez–Gianutio Countergambit, 1.e4 e5 2.f4 exf4 3.Bc4 f5
- C41 Philidor: Lopez Countergambit, 1.e4 e5 2.Nf3 d6 3.Bc4 f5
- C60 Spanish (Ruy Lopez), 1.e4 e5 2.Nf3 Nc6 3.Bb5
