= Johann Baptist Allgaier =

German-Austrian chess master and theoretician (1763–1823)

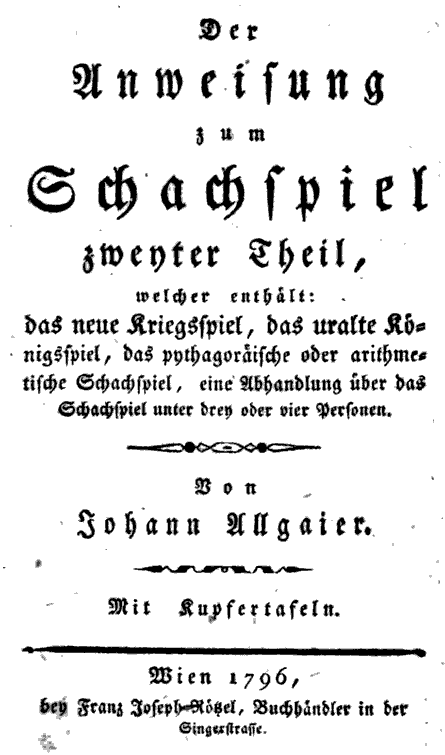
First page of Allgaier's Der Anweisung zum Schachspiel zweyter Theil (1796), the second part of his Neue theoretisch-praktische Anweisung zum Schachspiel (1795)

Johann Baptist Allgaier (June 19, 1763, Schussenried – January 3, 1823, Vienna) was a German-Austrian chess master and theoretician. He was also the author of the first chess handbook in German – Neue theoretisch-praktische Anweisung zum Schachspiel (Vienna 1795–96).

== About his biography ==
Relatively few details of his life are known. Only a few years after his death almost all information concerning his life, including dates of birth and death, were lost. Daniel Fiske traveled to Vienna between 1862 and 1863 and searched the archives of the city for some details about him, but in vain. Only in 1870 Anton Baron Reisner (a founder of the Wiener Schachgesellschaft and collaborator of the Neue Berliner Schachzeitung), by working in archives and by interviewing Allgaier's family members and others who knew him, managed to recover some details of the life of this master. Subsequently, it was discovered that some information was also present in the memories of Karl Heinrich von Ritters Lang written in 1842, but not known to the chess historians of the time.

== Biography ==
Johann Baptist Allgaier was born in 1763 in the Duchy of Württemberg; his mother tongue was the Swabian dialect. His father, Georg Allgaier, was employed at a monastery as a Hofmeister, the person, who, in those days, was in charge of the education of the children of the rich and noble families. The young Johann received a Catholic education and was directed by his father towards the study of theology. Following a trip to Poland, however, he learned chess from a Polish Jew and the game became his main interest at the expense of the study of theology. Subsequently, in 1798, he moved to Vienna and joined the army. In the Austrian capital, he was able to improve his chess skills. Towards the end of 1780, he won an important match from which he earned 1,500 florins and the reputation of the city's best player. This allowed Allgaier access to the aristocratic circles of the capital where he gave chess lessons. He also became the teacher of the sons and brothers of the Emperor Francis II. Since Allgaier was in the army, he participated in the Napoleonic wars between Austria and France. In 1809, he was employed in a field hospital, where he became ill with chronic asthma. Later he was moved to Prague where he became an accountant at the military hospital. He returned to Vienna in 1816 where the Emperor gave him, for health reasons (asthma), a modest pension. In order to make some additional money, he played chess in the Cafés of Vienna, and in particular to the Zur Goldenen Krone, the meeting place of many strong players in the capital, including Anton Witthalm and the Count Johann Somssich. Witthalm was one of the persons interviewed by Anton Baron Reisner to reconstruct Allgaier's life of that period. Witthalm reported that Allgaier's style was brilliant and mainly focused on attacking, while Somssich, by contrast, was more cautious and defensive. When Allgaier played, a crowd of spectators gathered at the premises of the Café to admire his brilliant play. Santo Vito, who edited the 6th and 7th edition of Allgaier's book, collected some of these games in an appendix. Allgaier was used to accept the challenge of anyone for a florin. This price for weaker players, also included a short lesson of the master after the game. In fact, Allgaier throughout most of his life had to deal with a constant shortage of money as it emerges from the memoirs of Karl Heinrich von Ritters Lang. Due to financial difficulties, Johann decided to reside a job of operating the infamous the Turk. Allgaier played hidden in the chess Automaton in 1809. That same year the Turk went against Napoleon at Schönbrunn Palace.

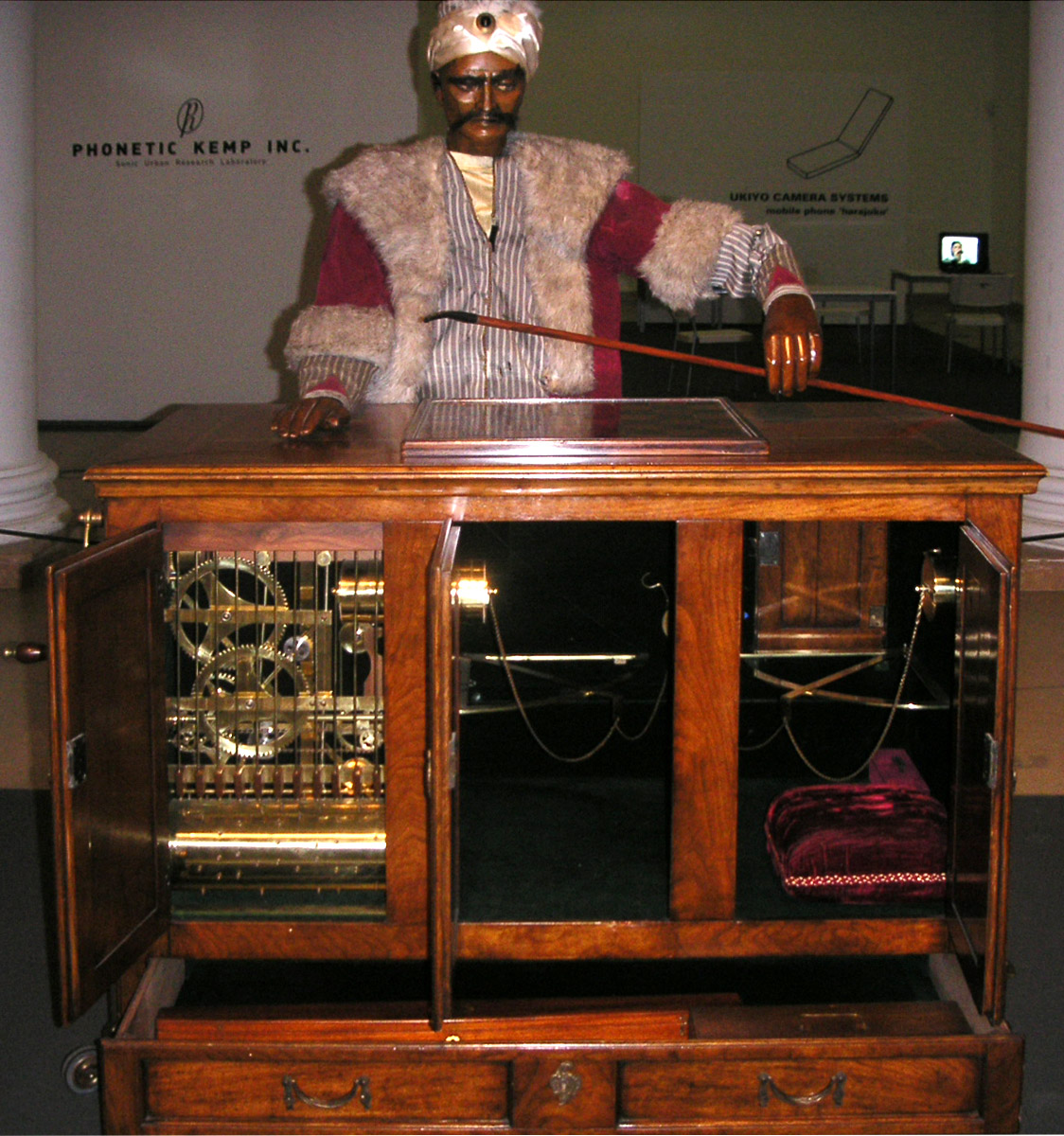
A 1980s Turk reconstruction

At the end of December 1822, he was admitted to the military hospital in Vienna and died a few days later of dropsy. The fact that he died in a public institution, although he was married, gives, according to Anton Baron Reisner, a clear proof of Allgaier's shortage of money. This was also confirmed by the papers of his legacy, which Reisner examined.

== Influence on chess ==
In 1795 and 1796 published in Vienna (in two volumes) his book Neue Theoretische-praktische Anweisung zum Schachspiel, which was regarded in some parts of Europe as the best text book of the time and was reprinted several times, even after his death; the seventh and final edition was in 1843.

From his treatise, it is clear that Allgaier knew very well the literature of his time. He was influenced both by the ideas of Philidor and the Modenese School (del Rio, Lolli and Ponziani) between which he tried some sort of compromise. The influence of the French master seemed dominant, however, and Allgaier was later called the "German Philidor".

Allgaier had a particular preference for the kingside pawn majority, which he believed to be, ceteris paribus, a decisive advantage since it can advance, as Philidor had taught in his treatise, against the enemy castling (e.g. e2–e4–e5, f2–f4, g2–g4, f4–f5 etc.). Unlike Philidor, however, he did not think that after 1.e4 e5 the move 2.Nf3 was a mistake. The French master believed that this move was wrong, in principle, because it prevents the f2-pawn from advancing and supporting, if needed, the e5-pawn. The pieces, according to Philidor, were better developed behind the pawns and, consequently, the knight had to be placed on e2 or f3, but only after the f-pawn was moved to f4. Often in Philidor's analysis, White occupies the center with e2–e4 followed by c2–c3 and d2–d4, starting from this configuration, the French pushed the pawn on e4 to e5 with the goal to gain space in the center and on the kingside. If the opponent attacked the e5-pawn with ... f6, Philidor supported it with f2–f4 and in case of fxe5, he continued with dxe5. At this point, having reached a configuration where White had a kingside majority, Philidor could advance the pawn e-, f-, and possibly g-pawn against the enemy castling. According to Philidor this attack was not only winning, but, due to the fact that Black could not prevent the opponent from achieving a kingside majority, the French believed that the first player had a decisive advantage and, with perfect play, White would always win the game. The Modenese School, in contrast, preferred to develop the pieces quickly, change a couple of pawns in the center and concentrate all its forces against a specific target (usually the opponent's king). Allgaier is half-way between the two Schools, he agrees with Philidor on the force of the kingside majority, but at the same time he argues that his experience as a player and as a student of chess led him to believe that the pieces' play all'italiana was a good alternative. Thus, the move 2.Nf3 was, according to Allgaier, perfectly playable if followed by a strategy that would lead to maximize the influence of the pieces rather than pawns. The games reported by Santo Vito, which, at least part of them, were probably played by Allgaier show that he was much more inclined to tactical play where the pieces come violently in contact with each other rather than to the slow movements of infantry advocated by Philidor (this fact is also confirmed by Witthalm). Only in his writings, he is closer to Philidor, whose ideas were prevailing at the time. From this perspective, it is probably not a coincidence that the variant of the King's Gambit named after him (1.e4 e5 2.f4 exf4 3.Nf3 g5 4.h4 g4 5.Ng5, the so-called Allgaier's Gambit) is a particularly sharp opening. After 5... h6, in fact, White must sacrifice the knight with 6.Nxf7, leading to a very tactical game (the author's analysis on this opening line is contained in the fourth edition of the Neue Anweisung of 1819).

=== Style of play and games ===
In the sixth and seventh edition of the Neue Anweisung, Santo Vito added an appendix containing four games played by the strongest players in Vienna. Anton Witthalm, interviewed by Reisner, affirmed that Allgaier had a very tactical style of play and the games recorded by Santo Vito (or at least part of them) were played by Allgaier. These games are rare and cannot be found in the common chess databases like ChessBase, 365chess, chessbites or chesslab and, consequently, are here reported. In the original text, there were no comments to the games; punctuation and the notes between square parenthesis come from analysis carried out with the chess engine FireBird 1.2. The first and second game show a more complex tactical struggle; game three, on the other hand, indicates a very poor endgame technique.

First Game
1.e4 e5 2.Nf3 d6 3.Bc4 f5 4.d4 fxe4 5.Nxe5 Nh6? 6.Bxh6 dxe5 7.Qh5+ Kd7 8.Qf5+ Kc6 9.Qxe4+? (9.Qxe5! gxh6? 10.Qb5+ Kd6 11.Qd5+ Ke7 12.Qe5+) 9...Kb6 10.Be3 exd4 11.Bxd4+ c5 12.Be3 Nc6 13.Nc3 a6 14.Nd5+ Ka7 15.b4 Bd6 16.bxc5 Qa5+ 17.c3? (17.Bd2!) 17...Bxc5 18.0-0 Bd7 19.Rab1 Rae8 20.Bxc5+ Qxc5 21.Qf4 Ne5 22.Bb3 Bc6 23.c4= b5? (23...Rhf8) 24.Ne3 (24.cxb5! Bxd5 25.Rfc1) 24...g5 25.Qf6 Rhf8 26.Qh6 bxc4 27.Nxc4 Rxf2 28.Rxf2 Qxf2+ 29.Kxf2 Ng4+ 30.Kg3 Nxh6= 31.Rf1 Re2 32.Rf2 Nf5+? (32...Rxf2=) 33.Rxf5 Rxg2+ 34.Kh3 g4+ 35.Kh4 Bf3 36.Rf7+ Kb8 37.Ne5 Rxh2+ 38.Kg5 h6+ 39.Kf4 Rf2 40.Nxf3 Rxf3+ 41.Kxg4 Rxf7 42.Bxf7 1–0

Second Game
1.e4 e5 2.Nf3 Nc6 3.Bc4 Nf6 4.Ng5 d5 5.exd5 Nxd5 6.Nxf7 Kxf7 7.Qf3+ Ke6 8.Nc3 Nce7 9.d4 c6 10.Bg5 h6 11.Bxe7 Bxe7 12.0-0-0? Bg5+ 13.Kb1 Rf8 14.Qe4 Rf4! (14...Rf5? 15.Rhe1+−) 15.Qxe5+ Kf7 16.Nxd5 cxd5 17.Bxd5+ Kf8 18.Bb3 Rf5 19.Qe4 Qc7 (19...Qe8!=) 20.Qd3 (20.g4! Rxf2 21.Qh7+−) 20...h5 21.h4 Be7 22.f3 a5 23.a4 b5 24.g4 bxa4 25.Bxa4 Rf6 26.Rhe1 Rb8 27.g5? gives the f5-square to the black bishop (27.Re4= Rfb6 28.b3) 27...Rfb6 28.b3 g6 29.d5? Bf5 30.Rxe7 Qxe7 31.Qc3 Kg8 32.Kb2 Rc8 33.Bc6 Qd6 34.Re1 a4 35.Qa5 a3+ 36.Qxa3 Rbxc6 37.dxc6 Qxc6 38.c4 Ra8 39.Qe7 Qa6 40.Qe2 Qa3+ 41.Kc3 Qa5+ 42.Kb2 Qc5 43.Kc3 Qa5+ 44.Kb2 Qb4? (44...Qa3+ 45.Kc3 Rb8 46.Qd1 Qa5+ 47.Kb2 Rd8−+) 45.Ra1 (45.Qd1 Qa3+ 46.Kc3 Rb8 47.Re5! White is worse, but not immediately lost) 45...Rb8 46.Qe3 Qxc4 47.Rc1 Qxh4 48.Qd2 Be6 49.Rc3 Qb4 50.Qc2 Bf5 51.Qd2 Qb7 52.Qd6 Qb6 53.Qg3 Qb5 54.Qg2 Re8 55.Rc4 Bd3 56.Kc3 Bxc4 57.bxc4 Re3+ 58.Kd2 Qb2+ 0–1

Third Game
1.e4 e5 2.f4 d6 3.Nf3 Bg4 4.Bc4 Nf6 5.c3 Bxf3 6.Qxf3 Nc6 7.0-0 exf4 8.d4 g5 9.Bxf4! gxf4 10.Qxf4 Be7 11.e5 dxe5 12.dxe5 Qd7 13.exf6 Bc5+ 14.Kh1 0-0-0 15.b4 (15.Bxf7) 15...Bd6 16.Qf2 Kb8 17.Na3 Rhg8 18.Qf5 Qxf5 19.Rxf5 Ne5 20.Re1 Rg4 21.Bb3 Nd3 22.Ref1 Rh4 23.h3 Ne5 24.Nb5 a6 25.Nxd6 cxd6+− 26.Rd1 Kc7 27.Bd5 Rg8 28.Rd4 Rh6 29.a4 Rgg6 30.Rdf4 Rg3 31.Bf3? Nxf3 32.Rxf3 Rxf3 33.Rxf3 Kd7 34.Kh2 Ke6 35.Kg3? (35.Re3+ Kxf6 36.Re8 and 37.Rb8) 35...Rxf6 36.Rxf6+ Kxf6 37.Kf4 d5? 38.a5? (38.h4! h6 [38...Ke6 39.Kg5 Ke5 40.Kh6+−] 39.g4 b6 40.h5! b5 41.a5 Ke6 42.g5+−) 38...h6? (38...Ke6! 39.Kg5 Ke5 40.Kh6 Ke4=) 39.g3? (39.g4 like in the previous variation) 39...Ke6 40.h4 f5 41.Ke3 Ke5 42.h5 Ke6 43.Kd4 Kd6 44.c4 dxc4 45.Kxc4 Kc6 46.Kd4 Kb5?? (46...Kd6=) 47.Kc3?? (47.Ke5 Kxb4 48.Kxf5 Kxa5 49.g4 Kb5 50.g5 hxg5 51.h6+−) 47...b6 48.axb6 Kxb6 49.Kb3 Kb5 50.Kc3 Ka4?? (50...Kc6 51.Kc4 Kb6=) 51.Kc4 Ka3 52.b5 axb5+ 53.Kxb5 Kb3 54.Kc5 Kc3 55.Kd5 1–0

Fourth Game
1.e4 e5 2.Bc4 c6 3.Nc3 Nf6 4.d3 d5 5.exd5 cxd5 6.Bb5+ Nc6 7.Nf3 Bd6 8.Qe2?! 0-0 9.0-0? Nd4 10.Nxd4 exd4 11.Nd1 a6 (11...Qa5!) 12.Ba4 b5 13.Bb3 Re8 14.Qd2 Qe7 15.c3 dxc3?! (15...Qe5! 16.f4 Qh5) 16.Nxc3? d4 17.Nd5? Nxd5 18.Bxd5 Qe5 19.Bxf7+ Kxf7 20.f4 Qe3+ 21.Kh1 Bb7 22.Qc2 Qe2 23.Qb3+ Kf8 24.Rg1 Bxg2+ 0–1
