= Alfonso Ceron =

Spanish chess player

Alfonso Cerón (Xerone, Girón) (1535 in Granada – ? in Gerona?) was a Spanish chess master.

Born in Granada, he had become a Catholic priest. He was one of the strongest Spanish chess players in the 16th century. Ceron participated in the first international tournament with four players (two Spanish and two Italian) which was held, at the invitation of King Philip II of Spain, at the Royal Court of Spain in El Escorial, close to Madrid, in 1575. He took 4th place, behind Leonardo da Cutri, Paolo Boi, and Ruy López de Segura.

He was an author of a chess handbook De latrunculorum ludo o Del juego del Ajedrez («Bibliotheca Hispana Nova» Tomo I, Madrid 1783, p. 17. Prima edizione, Roma 1673 I, 13).
