= Ponziani =

Ponziani is a surname. Notable people with this surname include:

- Domenico Lorenzo Ponziani (1719–1796), Italian priest and chess player
- Antonella Ponziani (born 1964), Italian actress
- Frances of Rome (1384–1440), Italian Catholic mystic and saint, sometimes referred to as Francesca Bussa de' Ponziani after her marriage to Lorenzo Ponziani

== See also ==
- Ponziani Opening, a chess opening named after Domenico Lorenzo Ponziani
