= School of chess =

Set of people sharing a common style of playing chess

A school of chess denotes a chess player or group of players that share common ideas about the strategy of the game. There have been several schools in the history of modern chess. Today there is less dependence on schools – players draw on many sources and play according to their personal style.

== The Philidor era ==
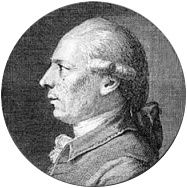
Philidor

In 1749, François-André Danican Philidor published Analyse du jeu des Échecs. This was the first book to discuss the strategy of chess in detail. It was also the first to discuss the interplay of pieces and pawns in the game. Philidor believed that maintaining the mobility of pawns was the most important strategic factor of chess, and he discussed pawn structure, particularly isolated pawns, doubled pawns, and backward pawns.

Philidor's writings were widely praised and misunderstood for 90 years. His ideas were taken up by the English school in the 1840s. In 1925, Aron Nimzowitsch recognized the importance of pawn mobility. Philidor has increasingly been recognized as the founder of modern chess strategy.

== Modenese school ==
The Modenese school is due to three 18th-century players known as the Modenese Masters: Domenico Lorenzo Ponziani, Giambattista Lolli, and Ercole del Rio. They recommended playing the Italian Game opening. In contrast to Philidor's idea of pawn structure and mobility, the Modenese school emphasized rapid development of the pieces for an attack on the opposing king from the get go, aiming for checkmate or a material advantage in the process, often at the expense of pawn efficiency or even whole pawns. This style of play was already employed by Gioachino Greco, Alessandro Salvio, and other Italian players of the 16th and 17th centuries.

== English school ==
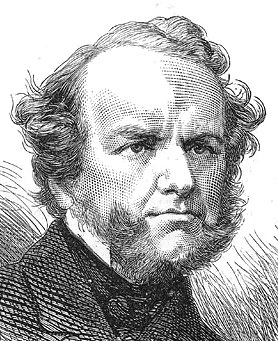
Staunton

The English school was founded by Howard Staunton in the 1840s. His followers included Bernhard Horwitz, Elijah Williams, Marmaduke Wyvill, and to some degree Adolf Anderssen and Daniel Harrwitz. In this style, there was no quick attack on the opposing king. Instead, the attacks were prepared, as strategic advantages – such as control over the center and key points – were first obtained. Pieces were developed behind pawns to support their advance. Staunton pioneered the use of flank openings and the fianchettoing of the bishop. After Staunton practically retired in 1853, these ideas were mostly neglected.

== Romantic chess ==
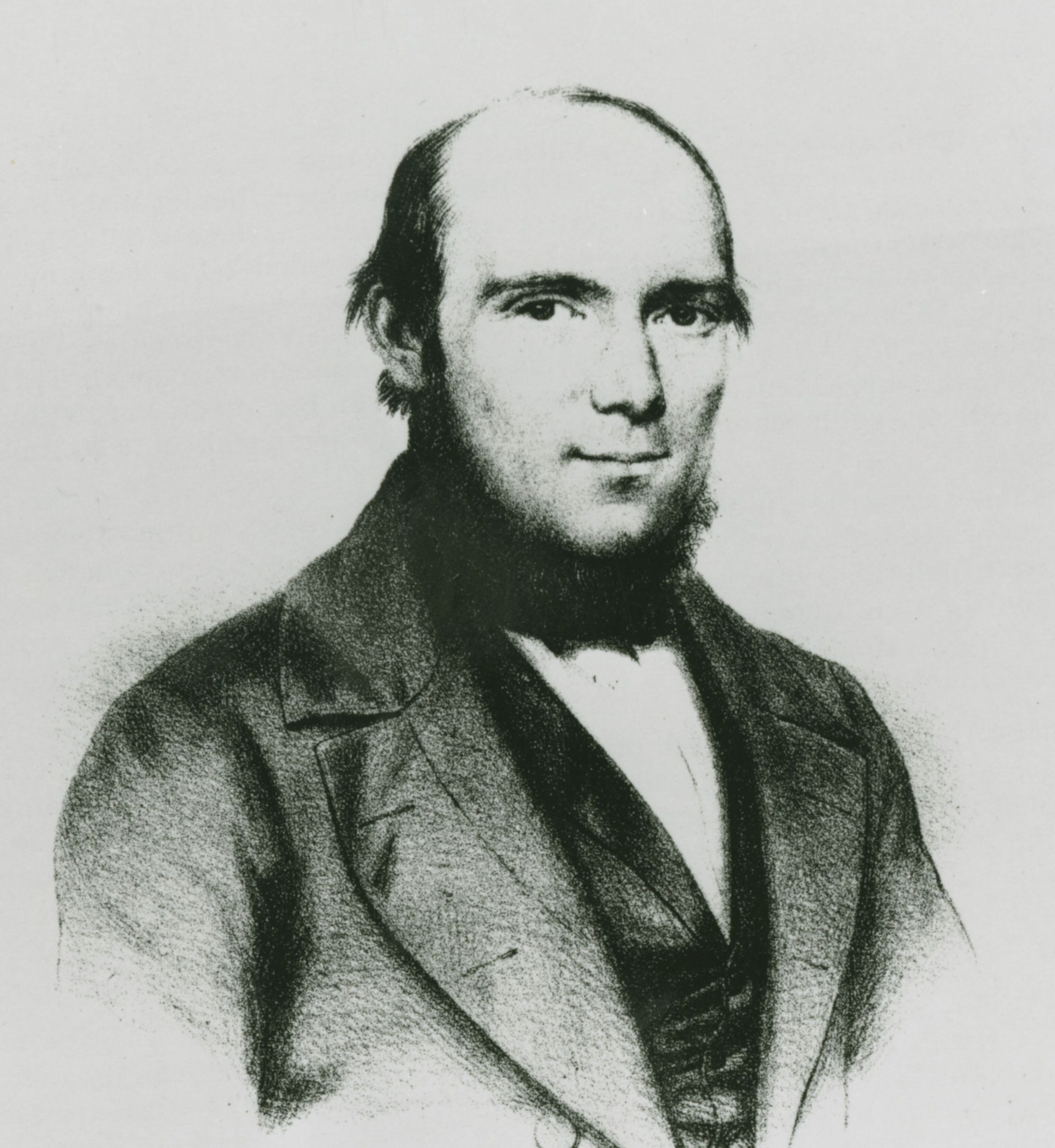
Anderssen

Romantic chess was the style of chess prevalent in the 19th century. It was characterized by brash sacrifices and open, tactical games. Winning was secondary to winning with style – so much, in fact, that it was considered unsportsmanly to decline a gambit (the sacrifice of a pawn or piece to obtain an attack). It is no coincidence that the most popular openings played by the Romantics were King's Gambit Accepted and the Evans Gambit Accepted. Some of the major players of the Romantic era were Adolf Anderssen, Paul Morphy and Henry Blackburne. A famous game of this time is the Immortal Game between Anderssen and Lionel Kieseritzky, which embodies the Romantic style. The style was effectively ended on the highest level by Wilhelm Steinitz, who, with his more positional approach, defeated many of his contemporaries and ushered in the modern age of chess.

== Classical school ==
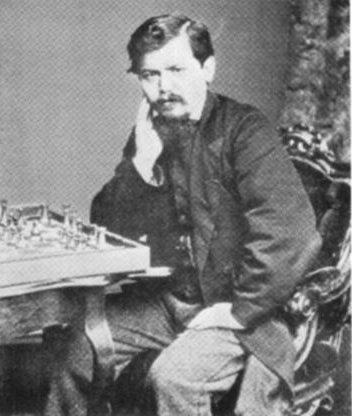
Steinitz

Around 1860, Louis Paulsen realized that many attacks on the king succeeded because of poor defense. Wilhelm Steinitz agreed with that and rejected the prevailing notion that attack was more honorable than defense. Steinitz, who had engaged in the mid-century Romantic style of play in his youth, began to change his focus to building a strong pawn structure and seeing small advantages to capitalize on rather than sweeping assaults against the enemy king. Positional play was not a new idea and there are many examples of such games from the Romantic era, however it did not become popular or widely accepted until Steinitz won the 1873 Vienna Tournament with his ideas of defense-based chess. He is considered the first true chess world champion, and remained so for 21 years despite not playing actively for almost 15 of them. In addition, he became the first chess master to make a living exclusively from professional chess, while most players up to this time played the game merely as a hobby or way to earn extra money while having other professions as their main occupation.

Steinitz's ideas were controversial and widely criticized—some older players such as Adolf Anderssen never fully accepted them. He wrote numerous articles in chess publications defending his ideas, and by the 1890s they were embraced by a new generation of young players such as Siegbert Tarrasch and Emanuel Lasker. These players also took Steinitz's ideas and improved and made them more rational and accessible. In 1894, the torch was effectively passed to Steinitz's pupils when he was defeated by Lasker for the world championship.

As a result of the classical school, many of the chess openings which had been hallmarks of Romantic chess such as the King's Gambit and Philidor's Defense fell out of use among elite players, while the Queen's Gambit, previously rare, became a staple of high-level chess.

By the opening years of the 20th century, chess masters outside of Europe began to appear (previously, Paul Morphy had been the only notable non-European player). These included the Americans Harry Nelson Pillsbury and Frank Marshall, and later the Cuban Jose Raul Capablanca. Emanuel Lasker held onto the world championship a record 27 years, although he did not play chess for long periods of time owing to his career as a mathematics professor.

== Hypermodern school ==
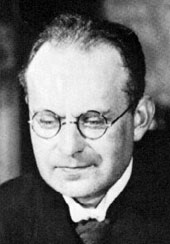
Nimzowitsch

The hypermodern school was founded by Aron Nimzowitsch, Richard Réti, Savielly Tartakower, Gyula Breyer, and Ernst Grünfeld in the 1920s. The hypermodernists rejected the idea that occupation of the center was important. Instead, the hypermodern school emphasizes control of the center by attacking it with pieces – especially from the periphery. The hypermodern school also denied the superiority of the two bishops in all types of positions and claimed that the bishop pair was only strong in open or semi-open positions.

While e4 openings and tactical play were still common during the classical era, the post-WWI period saw a significant shift as e4 openings of any kind became unfashionable outside the amateur level. Richard Reti went so far as to pronounce e4 "a decisive mistake" and argued that d4 was the only rational way to open a game, while the Sicilian Defense and French Defense were the only rational responses to 1. e4. Players such as Frank Marshall and Jose Raul Capablanca (who took the world championship from Lasker in 1921), formerly known as tactical players and users of e4 openings, began switching their repertoires to queen-side pawn openings and a more positional style of play in the 1920s.

In 1927, Alexander Alekhine challenged Capablanca for the world championship. The match, lasting 34 games, was held in Buenos Aires, Argentina and achieved infamy for its overuse of the Orthodox Defense of the Queen's Gambit Declined (QGD), which was used in all but two games (the remaining two featured a French Defense and Queen's Indian Defense). Alekhine defeated Capablanca to become the fourth world chess champion, which he retained until his death in 1946 (aside from two years where he lost the title to Max Euwe).

The excessive use of the Queen's Gambit Declined Orthodox Defense in the 1927 championship match brought about an increased acceptance of hypermodern openings, which began to become a staple of competitive chess during the 1930s. In addition, elite players began to explore the Slav Defense and other QGD variants.

== Soviet hegemony ==
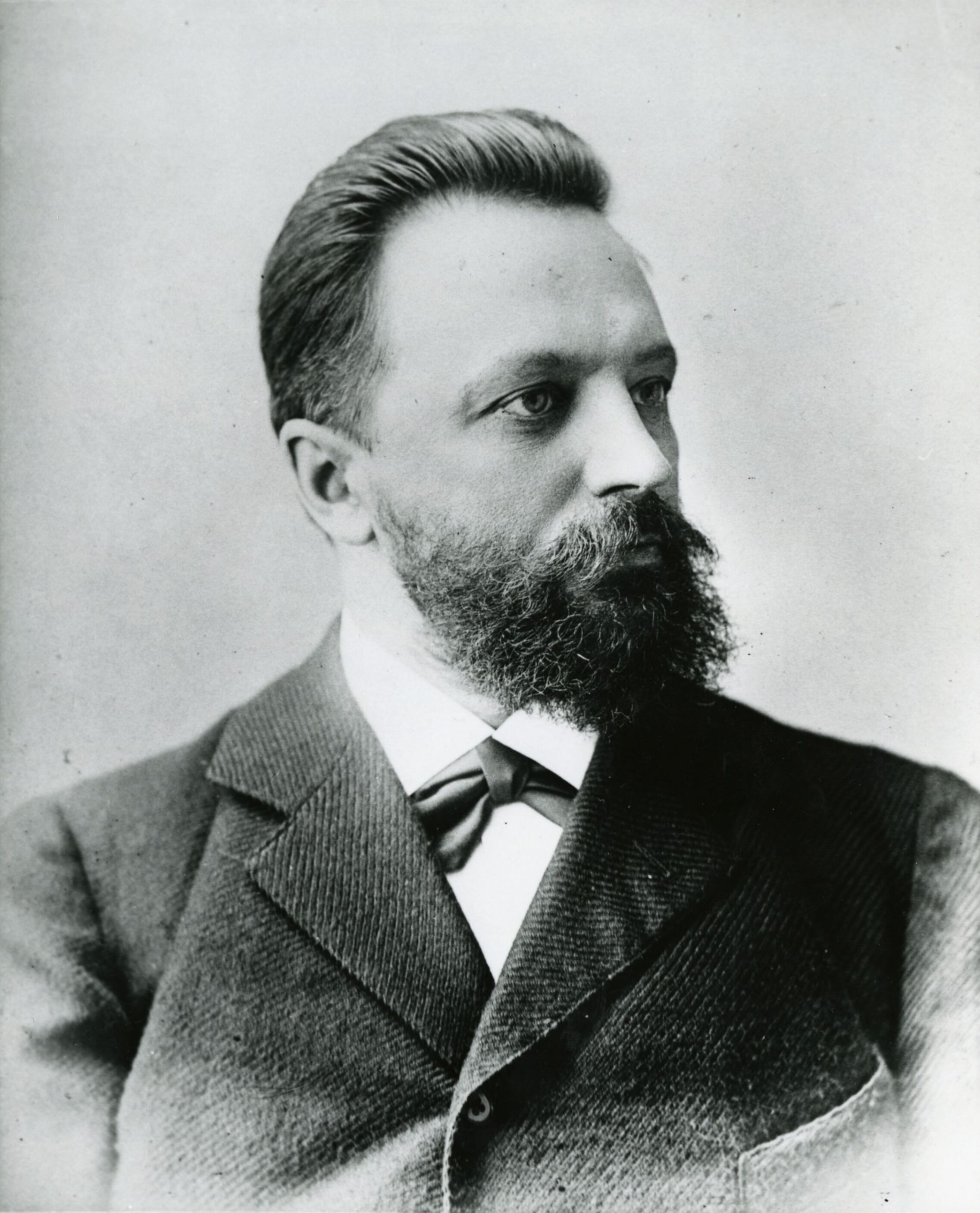
Chigorin

In the 1940s the Soviet Union began a long domination of chess. The Soviet school agreed with Tarrasch and emphasized mobility. A weakness that could not be attacked was not a real weakness. The Soviet school was based on the teachings of Mikhail Chigorin (1850–1908).

Mikhail Botvinnik was the first truly dominant Soviet grandmaster, having been groomed for the role due to his youth and loyalty to communism. In 1937, he won the USSR Championship, but the world championship had to wait for over a decade until after WWII had ended. The current world champion, Alexander Alekhine, had died in 1946, leaving the championship vacant. Botvinnik became world champion by winning a tournament of five top players, the World Chess Championship 1948.

After WWII, hypermodern openings such as the Indian Defenses became a staple of high-level chess and have remained so ever since. In addition, the period saw a meteoric rise of the Sicilian Defense, which had been written about since the 16th century but was uncommon until the 1950s.

== See also ==
- Berlin Pleiades
- History of chess
- Traité des Amateurs
