= Muzio Gambit =

Chess opening

Position: a8 black rook, b8 black knight, c8 black bishop, d8 black queen, e8 black king, f8 black bishop, g8 black knight, h8 black rook, a7 black pawn, b7 black pawn, c7 black pawn, d7 black pawn, f7 black pawn, h7 black pawn, c4 white bishop, e4 white pawn, f4 black pawn, g4 black pawn, f3 white knight, a2 white pawn, b2 white pawn, c2 white pawn, d2 white pawn, g2 white pawn, h2 white pawn, a1 white rook, b1 white knight, c1 white bishop, d1 white queen, f1 white rook, g1 white king
- Moves: 1.e4 e5 2.f4 exf4 3.Nf3 g5 4.Bc4 g4 5.0-0
- ECO: C37
- Origin: Manuscript by Giulio Cesare Polerio
- Named after: From a translation of Alessandro Salvio by Jacob Sarratt, who misattributed the move to Mutio d'Allesandro
- Parent: King's Gambit
- Synonyms: Polerio Gambit; Muzio–Polerio Gambit

In chess, the Muzio Gambit, sometimes called the Polerio Gambit, is an opening line in the King's Gambit beginning with the moves:

1. e4 e5
2. f4 exf4
3. Nf3 g5
4. Bc4 g4
5. 0-0

White sacrifices a knight in return for a large lead in development and attacking chances, aiming to exploit Black's weakness on the f-file.

The Encyclopaedia of Chess Openings classifies the Muzio Gambit under code C37.

== History ==
The opening was originally analysed by Giulio Cesare Polerio in the late 16th century; the first recorded game is by the Neapolitan player Geronimo Cascio in Alessandro Salvio's Il Puttino, published in 1634. The name "Muzio Gambit" originated with the early 19th-century English chess writer Jacob Sarratt, who misattributed the opening to Cascio's contemporary Mutio d'Allesandro in his translation of Il Puttino. In its original form, White used Italian-style free castling, placing the king on h1 and rook on f1, for an even stronger attack since checks by a queen or bishop on the g1–a7 diagonal are no longer available as a tempo-gaining defence.

The opening reached its peak popularity in the mid 19th century, the Romantic era of chess, when sacrifices and early attacks were considered the pinnacle of chess art. Its popularity declined with the improvements in defensive technique exemplified by players such as Louis Paulsen and Wilhelm Steinitz.

== Analysis ==
1. e4 e5 2. f4 exf4 3. Nf3 g5 4. Bc4 g4

4.Bc4 (rather than 4.h4) usually signals White's intention of playing a Muzio. Black can avoid the Muzio with 4...Bg7, and this has often been recommended as a safe and practical over-the-board choice.

5. 0-0!

The characteristic move of the Muzio Gambit, sacrificing a knight for a large lead in development and sustained pressure along the f-file. 5.Ne5, the Salvio Gambit has almost disappeared from modern practice due to the insecurity of White's king after 5...Qh4+. Other possible piece sacrifices for White include 5.Bxf7+ (Lolli Gambit), 5.Nc3 (McDonnell Gambit), 5.d4 (Ghulam Kassim Gambit), but 5.0-0! is generally reckoned to be White's strongest option.

5... gxf3

If Black postpones taking the knight with 5...d5?! (Brentano Defence), White obtains a strong attack beginning either 6.exd5 or 6.Bxd5. Black also has 5...Qe7 (Kling and Horwitz Counterattack).

6. Qxf3 Qf6 (diagram)

Position: a8 black rook, b8 black knight, c8 black bishop, e8 black king, f8 black bishop, g8 black knight, h8 black rook, a7 black pawn, b7 black pawn, c7 black pawn, d7 black pawn, f7 black pawn, h7 black pawn, f6 black queen, c4 white bishop, e4 white pawn, f4 black pawn, f3 white queen, a2 white pawn, b2 white pawn, c2 white pawn, d2 white pawn, g2 white pawn, h2 white pawn, a1 white rook, b1 white knight, c1 white bishop, f1 white rook, g1 white king

Muzio Gambit after 6.Qxf3 Qf6

"The thematic starting position in the Muzio. Black's last move is very definitely best since it not only barricades the f-file but also impedes the formation of a white pawn centre with d4." A sideline is 6...Qe7 (From Defence), where White's strongest reply begins 7.d4 Nc6 8.Nc3! as in Steinitz–Anderssen (casual game), London 1862. Walter Korn gives simply 7.d3! followed by 8.Nc3 for slight advantage to White.

GM Dmitry Andreikin played the rare move 6...Bh6 against Hikaru Nakamura in the 2010 World Blitz Chess Championship, eventually losing. Marović and Sušić wrote that 6...Bh6 is unhelpful to Black, due to 7.d4 Qh4 8.Nc3 Ne7 9.g3 fxg3 10.hxg3 Qh3 11.Rf2. According to Keres, Black is less than equal after 6...Bh6 7.d4 Qf6 8.e5 Qf5 9.Nc3.

7. e5

"The most logical. With this extra sacrifice of a pawn White opens up new lines for attack." A more reserved continuation is 7.d3 Bh6 8.Nc3 Ne7, when 9.e5! Qxe5 10.Bd2 transposes to the 7.e5 main line, whereas 9.Bxf4 Bxf4 10.Qxf4 Qxf4 11.Rxf4 f5! leads to an advantage for Black. Also possible is 7.c3 Nc6 8.d4 Nxd4 9.Bxf7+ Qxf7 10.cxd4 Bh6 11.Nc3 d6 12.Nd5 Be6 13.Nxf4 Bxf4 14.Bxf4 0-0-0 15.d5 Bd7 16.Qc3 Qf6 17.e5 Qg7 18.Rae1 (18.e6=) 18...Bb5 19.Rf2 Ne7 20.Qa5 Nxd5= (Korchnoi).

7... Qxe5

and now White's main choices are 8.Bxf7+!? and 8.d3:

=== Double Muzio Gambit: 8.Bxf7+!? ===
8. Bxf7+!?

This is known as the Double Muzio Gambit, "the best version of the Muzio" according to Keene. It is very dangerous against an unprepared opponent; however, its soundness has been called into question.

8... Kxf7 9. d4 (diagram) Qf5!

Position: a8 black rook, b8 black knight, c8 black bishop, f8 black bishop, g8 black knight, h8 black rook, a7 black pawn, b7 black pawn, c7 black pawn, d7 black pawn, f7 black king, h7 black pawn, e5 black queen, d4 white pawn, f4 black pawn, f3 white queen, a2 white pawn, b2 white pawn, c2 white pawn, g2 white pawn, h2 white pawn, a1 white rook, b1 white knight, c1 white bishop, f1 white rook, g1 white king

Double Muzio after 9.d4

Traditionally, the most popular move has been 9...Qxd4+; then after 10.Be3 Qf6 11.Bxf4 British correspondence grandmaster Peter Millican asserts that the position is "objectively equal", while Scottish grandmaster John Shaw says "If I was guaranteed to reach this position, I would recommend 4.Bc4 and the Muzio...". Shaw sharply criticises 9...Qxd4+ which "grabs a meaningless pawn, opens another line for White's attack and makes the black queen vulnerable on the dark squares"; grandmaster Neil McDonald even goes so far as to suggest that 9...Qf5 may be the only playable move.

After 9...Qf5, Shaw cites the game Showalter–Taubenhaus, New York 1889, which continued 10.g4 Qg6 11.Nc3 Nf6 12.Bxf4 d6 13.Bg3 Kg7, as an example of a successful defence by Black. Yakov Estrin suggests 11.Bxf4 Nf6 12.Be5 d6 13.Bxf6 Bxg4 14.Qg2 Rg8 15.Kh1 Bf5 16.Qd5+!, assessing the position as better for White. McDonald disputes this assessment, saying Black should win after 16...Kxf6 17.Nc3 Nc6 18.Rxf5+! Ke7! Both Millican and Shaw recommend 10.Bxf4 rather than the "loosening" 10.g4, though Shaw describes it as "unconvincing" after 10...Nf6 (to which Millican considers 11.Qe2 "!?").

=== Main line: 8.d3 ===
8. d3 Bh6 9. Nc3 Ne7 10. Bd2 Nbc6 11. Rae1 Qf5! (Paulsen Variation)

White was believed to be better until this move was suggested in 1858 by a Milwaukee player identified only as "W.S."; previously 11...Qc5+ had been played. Louis Paulsen introduced the new move during his match with leading Austrian master Ignatz Kolisch in 1861, winning the game after a well-conducted defence.

12. Nd5 Kd8

with continuations:
- 13.Qe2 (a move attributed to the British amateur R. E. Lean, sometimes misidentified as "Maclean") and now:
  - 13...Qe6 14.Qf2 (neither 14.Nxe7, 14.Qf3, nor 14.Bc3 is better) 14...Qf5= (draw by repetition); if 14...Qg4 15.h3 Qg6 16.Bxf4 White is better (Znosko-Borovsky).
  - 13...b5 14.Nxe7 (according to Tim Harding, 14.Bxf4! gives White the advantage) 14...Qc5+ 15.Rf2 (Berger) Qxe7 (Korchnoi gives 15...Nxe7!−/+, whereas Keene gives 15...Nxe7 16.Bc3 Re8 17.Bxf7 Rf8 18.Bd4!+−) 16.Qh5 Qg5 17.Qxf7 bxc4! 18.Bc3 Rf8! 19.Bf6+ Qxf6 20.Re8+ Rxe8 21.Qxf6+ Ne7 22.Qxh6 cxd3 23.cxd3 Rb8 24.Qxh7 Rb6 25.b3 Ng6 with clear advantage for Black.
- 13.Bc3 and Black has three satisfactory squares for the attacked rook:

- 13...Rg8 14.Rxe7 (Note: The editors of Korchnoi and Zak's book provide the game Karl Marx vs. Meyer in which Marx continued 14.Bf6, winning at move 28.) Nxe7 15.Bf6 Re8 16.g4 Qg6 17.Qe2 Bf8 18.g5 d6= (Bilguer).
- 13...Re8, here White has tried 14.Bf6 and 14.Nf6, but best is 14.Qe2 Qe6 15.Qf3 Qf5 16.Qe2= (drawn by repetition, Keene–Pfleger, Montilla 1974).
- 13...Rf8! 14.g4 Qg6 15.h4 Nxd5 16.Bxd5 f6 17.Qe2 Ne5! 18.g5 Bxg5! (analysis by Panov) where Black has the advantage and a kingside attack.

=== Other 8th moves for White ===
- 8.b3 Qxa1 (8...d5 9.Bxd5 Ne7 10.Bc4 Nbc6 11.c3 Bf5−/+ Tartakower–Leonhardt, Vienna 1908) 9.Nc3 Bc5+ 10.Kh1 Ne7 11.d4 Bxd4 12.Bxf7+ (12.Qf4 Qxc1) Kd8 13.Bd2 Qxf1 14.Qxf1 Rf8 15.Qf4 Nbc6−/+ (Walker).
- 8.Nc3 Qd4+ 9.Kh1 Qxc4 10.d3 Qc6 11.Qxf4 f6−/+ (Keres).

== See also ==
- List of chess openings
- List of chess openings named after people
