= Il Puttino =

Book by Alessandro Salvio

Il Puttino is an Italian book first published by Alessandro Salvio in 1634. Its full Italian title is:

IL PVTTINO Altramente detto, IL CAVALIERO ERRANTE DEL SALVIO, Sopra il gioco de'Scacchi, con la sua Apologia contra il Carrera, diuiso in tre Libri. IN NAPOLI, Nella Stampa di Gio: Domenico Montanaro. 1634. Con licenza de'Superiori. (English: IL PVTTINO, Otherwise called, THE ERRANT KNIGHT OF SALVIO, Above the Game of Chess, with his Apologia against Carrera, divided into three books. IN NAPLES, In Gio's Press: Domenico Montanaro. 1634. With permission of the Superiors.)

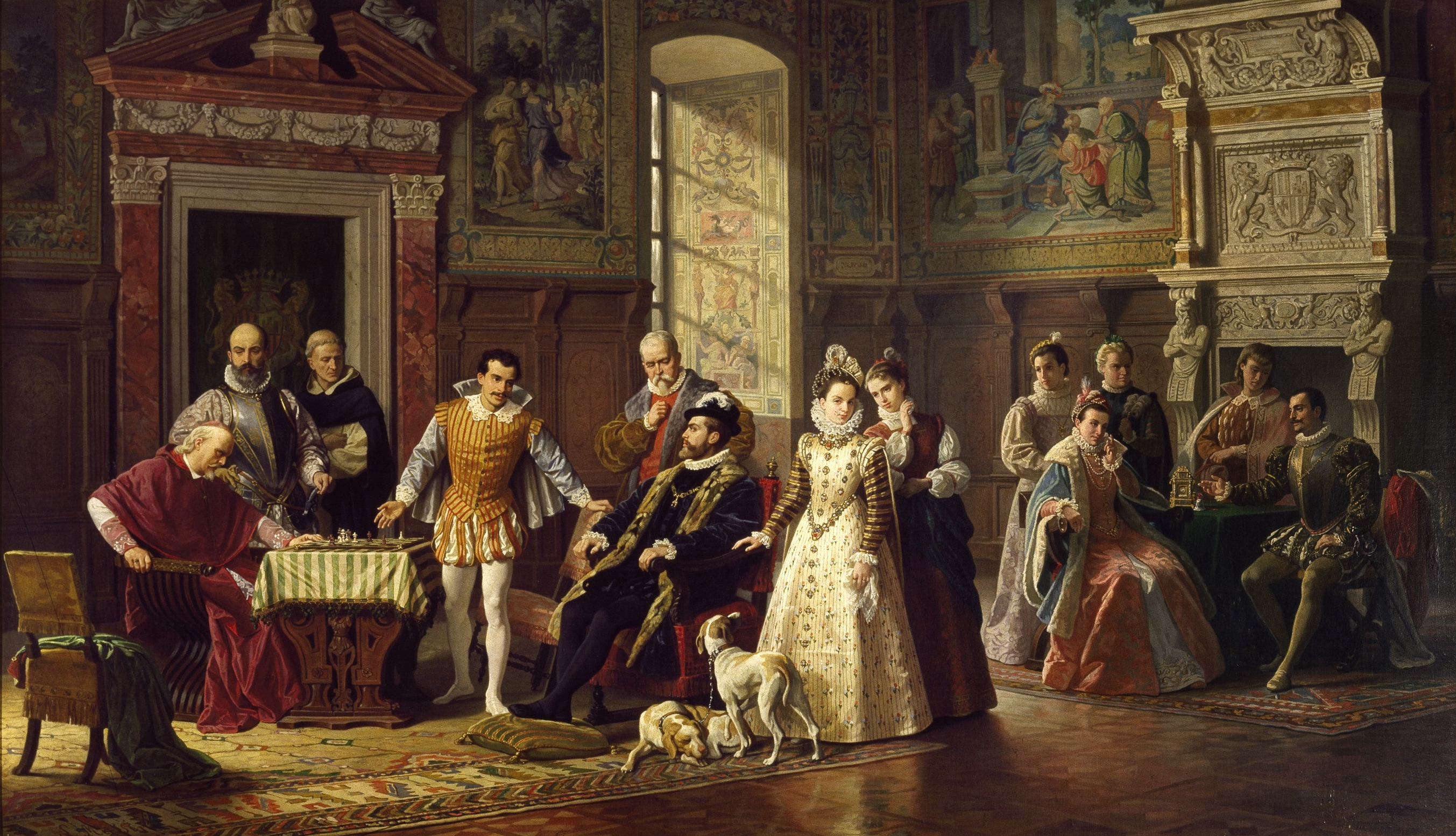
Sfida scacchistica alla corte del Re di Spagna showing Giovanni Leonardo ("Il Puttino") at the court of Philip II of Spain, around 1575, painting by Luigi Mussini (1883).

According to JH Saratt's translation, Il Puttino was first published in 1604 and reprinted in 1634. The four books were reprinted by an unknown author in 1723. The latter work, published in 1723, is sometimes referred to as The Salvio.

It is the second book (libro secondo in Italian), or second chapter of the first book published in 1634. It tells a story which took place 50–60 years before publication. See also "LIBRO QUARTO", fourth book, reprint of the trattato of 1604.

"Il Puttino" was a nickname used by Salvio for Giovanni Leonardo from Cutro. A long list of chess players are named in the Puttino which reflect real persons, including:

- Ruy Lopez
- Leonardo
- Puttino
- Paolo Boi
- Giulio Cesare da Lanciano

English chess player George Walker first translated Il Puttino into English under the title "The light and lustre of chess" in the Chess Player's Chronicle in 1843.
