= King's Fianchetto Opening =

Chess opening

Position: a8 black rook, b8 black knight, c8 black bishop, d8 black queen, e8 black king, f8 black bishop, g8 black knight, h8 black rook, a7 black pawn, b7 black pawn, c7 black pawn, d7 black pawn, e7 black pawn, f7 black pawn, g7 black pawn, h7 black pawn, g3 white pawn, a2 white pawn, b2 white pawn, c2 white pawn, d2 white pawn, e2 white pawn, f2 white pawn, h2 white pawn, a1 white rook, b1 white knight, c1 white bishop, d1 white queen, e1 white king, f1 white bishop, g1 white knight, h1 white rook
- Moves: 1.g3
- ECO: A00
- Synonyms: Rat Opening; Benko Opening; Hungarian Opening

The King's Fianchetto Opening, also known as the Rat Opening, the Benko Opening, and the Hungarian Opening, is a chess opening characterized by the move:

1. g3

White's 1.g3 ranks as the fifth most popular opening move, but it is far less popular than 1.e4, 1.d4, 1.c4 and 1.Nf3. It is usually followed by 2.Bg2, fianchettoing the bishop. Nick de Firmian writes that 1.g3 "can, and usually does, transpose into almost any other opening in which White fianchettos his king's bishop". Included among these are the Catalan Opening, the King's Indian Attack and some variations of the English Opening. For this reason, the Encyclopaedia of Chess Openings has no specific code devoted to 1.g3. The move itself is classified under A00, but the numerous transpositional possibilities can result in various ECO codes. Transposition by delayed fianchetto occurs in the Barcza Opening (1.Nf3 d5 2.g3 or 1.Nf3 Nf6 2.g3).

== Use ==
While this opening has never been common, the Madras player Ghulam Kassim, annotating the 1828 correspondence match between Madras and Hyderabad, noted that "many of the Indian players commence their game in this way." The hypermodern player Richard Réti played 1.g3 several times at Baden-Baden in 1925, with mixed results. 1.g3 received renewed attention after Pal Benko used it to defeat Bobby Fischer and Mikhail Tal in the 1962 Candidates Tournament in Curaçao, part of the 1963 World Championship cycle. Benko used the opening the first eleven times he was White in the tournament. Viktor Korchnoi employed it once against Anatoly Karpov in the 1978 World Chess Championship.

== Theory ==
By playing 1.g3, White prepares to fianchetto the king's bishop on the long diagonal and also to push e4, since the fianchettoed bishop supports that square. White can also transpose into the King's Indian Attack by playing Nf3, then castling kingside. This opening generally leads to closed positions.

== Sample lines ==
The following lines are examples of the kinds of positions that can develop from the King's Fianchetto Opening. Move order is flexible in each case.

=== King's Indian Attack ===
Position: a8 black rook, d8 black queen, e8 black king, f8 black bishop, h8 black rook, a7 black pawn, b7 black pawn, d7 black knight, f7 black pawn, g7 black pawn, h7 black pawn, c6 black pawn, f6 black knight, d5 black pawn, e5 black pawn, e4 white pawn, g4 black bishop, d3 white pawn, f3 white knight, g3 white pawn, a2 white pawn, b2 white pawn, c2 white pawn, d2 white knight, f2 white pawn, g2 white bishop, h2 white pawn, a1 white rook, c1 white bishop, d1 white queen, f1 white rook, g1 white king

King's Indian Attack, Yugoslav Variation (ECO A07)

1. g3 d5 2. Bg2 Nf6 3. Nf3 c6 4. 0-0 Bg4 5. d3 Nbd7 6. Nbd2 e5 7. e4 (diagram).

=== English Opening ===
Position: a8 black rook, c8 black bishop, d8 black queen, f8 black rook, g8 black king, a7 black pawn, b7 black pawn, c7 black pawn, g7 black bishop, h7 black pawn, c6 black knight, d6 black pawn, f6 black knight, g6 black pawn, d5 white knight, e5 black pawn, f5 black pawn, c4 white pawn, e4 white pawn, d3 white pawn, g3 white pawn, a2 white pawn, b2 white pawn, e2 white knight, f2 white pawn, g2 white bishop, h2 white pawn, a1 white rook, c1 white bishop, d1 white queen, f1 white rook, g1 white king

English Opening, Botvinnik System (ECO A26)

1. g3 g6 2. Bg2 Bg7 3. c4 e5 4. Nc3 d6 5. d3 f5 6. e4 Nf6 7. Nge2 Nc6 8. 0-0 0-0 9. Nd5 (diagram).

== See also ==
- List of chess openings
- List of chess openings named after people
