= Antonius van der Linde =

Dutch chess player, librarian and historian (1833–1897)

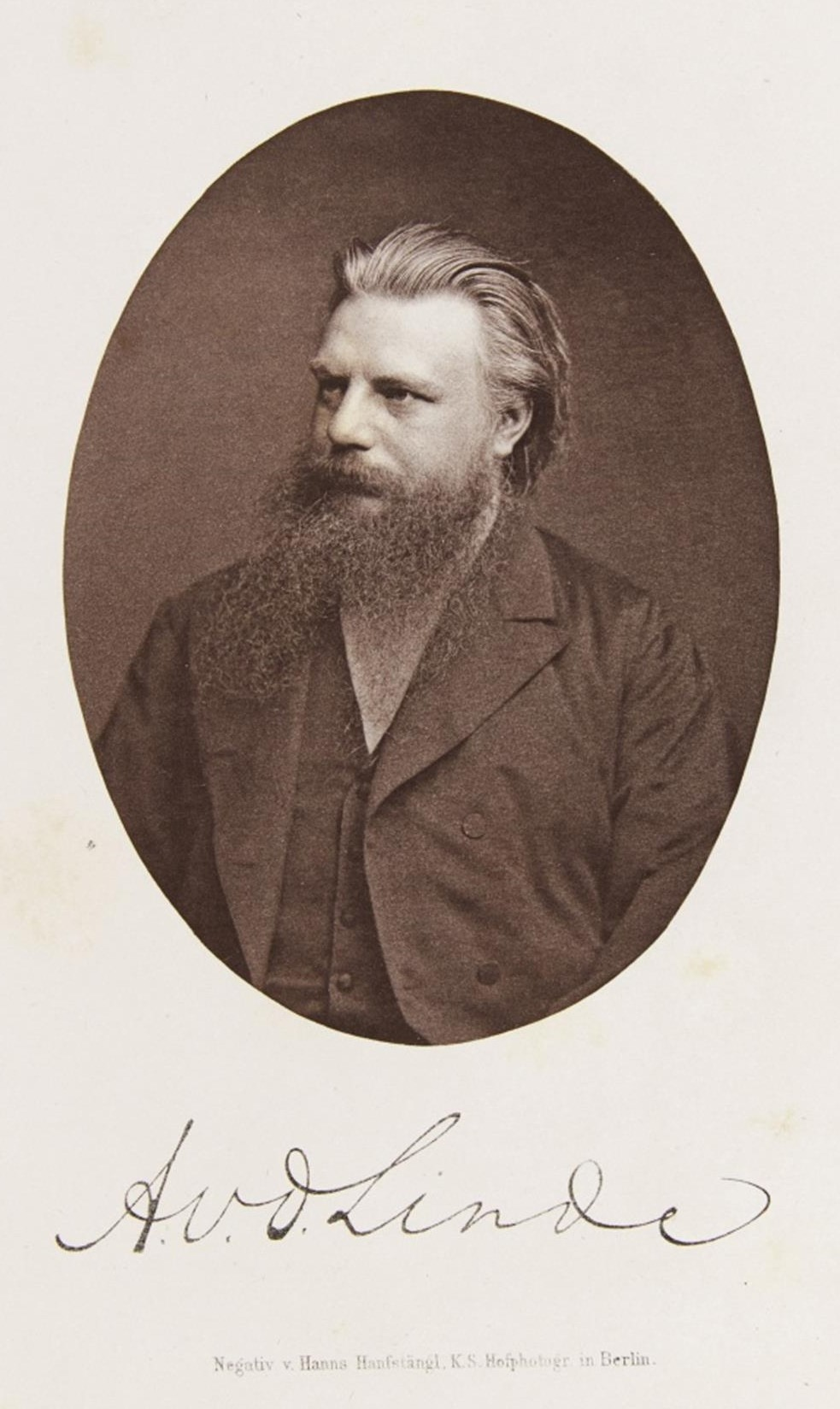
Antonius van der Linde

Antonius van der Linde (14 November 1833 – 12 August 1897) was a Dutch historian, librarian, theologian, and philologist. He is regarded as the first notable chess historian.

== Life ==
His parents were the saddler Hendricus van der Linde (died 1834) and his wife Katharina de Vries (1801–1880).

As a child, he was sent by his Mennonite mother to a school operated by that church organization, where he developed an early passion for metaphysics and theology, initially leading him to pursue a career as a clergyman in Amsterdam. In 1861, however, he enrolled at the University of Göttingen, earning his doctorate as early as 1862 with a dissertation on Spinoza.

He returned to the Netherlands the same year and settled in Nijmegen, where he began studying chess more closely. He became a member of the local chess circles and started publishing his first writings on the game. In 1865, his first work on chess, De schaakpartijen van Gioachino Greco, appeared in Nijmegen. Shortly thereafter, he played a correspondence chess match against the Berlin chess master Jean Dufresne, which van der Linde won 1.5–0.5.

In 1870, van der Linde published a treatise that made him an unpopular figure in the Netherlands. In it, he thoroughly refuted the widespread legend that Laurens Janszoon Coster, rather than Johannes Gutenberg, had been the inventor of movable-type printing. In 1871, he moved to Berlin to study Sanskrit. In 1874, he published his most significant work on chess in the German capital, Geschichte und Litteratur des Schachspiels, which is still regarded today as a standard reference work on chess history and bibliography.

Also in 1874, van der Linde returned to his homeland and settled in Arnhem. His book Het Schaakspel in Nederland was published in 1875. That same year, he lost his entire fortune, which had been invested in an Amsterdam banking house, when the bank went bankrupt. Van der Linde sold both his Spinoza collection (166 volumes) and his chess book collection (800 volumes and manuscripts) to the Royal Library in The Hague. This formed the foundation of one of the largest chess libraries in the world ("Bibliotheca van der Linde-Niemeijeriana").

In 1876, van der Linde was appointed senior librarian (Oberbibliothekar) of the Royal State Library in Wiesbaden. This appointment was an expression of recognition for the foreign scholar, whose livelihood the Prussian cultural administration sought to secure. In 1881, two more major works on chess by van der Linde were published in Berlin, originally titled Das erste Jartausend [sic] der Schachlitteratur and Quellenstudien zur Geschichte des Schachspiels.

Because he allegedly neglected the library due to his prolific writing, van der Linde was forced into retirement in 1894 on grounds of "organizational incompetence." His second marriage had already ended in divorce in 1883. He died lonely and in desolate personal circumstances.

== Legacy and assessment ==
The historian Walther Peter Fuchs described van der Linde as a scholar "of unusual productivity in fields as far apart as dogmatics, exegesis of biblical scriptures, ecclesiastical and secular history, philosophy, contemporary criticism, biography, bibliography, heraldry, and much more, as well as a translator of works by Spinoza, Ebrard, Schelling, and Friedrich Julius Stahl." Alongside his chess-historical works and the aforementioned Geschichte der Erfindung der Buchdruckkunst of 1886—for which he was awarded the title of professor—his thorough investigation Kaspar Hauser, eine neugeschichtliche Legende deserves mention. However, it also revealed a flaw in van der Linde's character: his penchant for biting invective and cynicism.

As a chess historian, his significance remains undisputed today. He conceived of chess history as the history of chess-related literature, borrowing his interpretive methods from his original field of theological exegesis. Although van der Linde was deeply committed to historical truth, he was prone to strong partisanship and exhibited German-nationalist prejudices.

== Works ==
- Das erste Jartausend [sic] der Schachlitteratur. Berlin 1881
- De schaakpartijen van Gioachino Greco. Nijmegen 1865
- Geschichte der Erfindung der Buchdruckkunst, 3 vols., Berlin 1886
- Das Schachspiel des 16. Jahrhunderts. Berlin 1873
- Geschichte und Litteratur des Schachspiels. Vol. 1. Julius Springer, Berlin 1874 (online). Vol. 2. Julius Springer, Berlin 1874 (online).
- Quellenstudien zur Geschichte des Schachspiels. Berlin 1881
- Het schaakspel in Nederland. 1875
- Kaspar Hauser. Eine neugeschichtliche Legende, 2 vols., Wiesbaden 1887
- Spinoza. Seine Lehre und deren Nachwirkungen in Holland. Doctoral dissertation, University of Göttingen 1862
