= Camilla Dufour =

British singer, writer and teacher of chess

- Born: Elizabeth Camilla Dufour
- Died: 1846; Paris
- Other names: Camilla Sarratt
- Occupations: singer, actor, author, chess teacher
- Known for: Lead singer
- Spouse: Jacob Henry Sarratt

(Elizabeth) Camilla Dufour became Camilla Sarratt (17?? – 1846) was a British singer, writer and teacher of chess.

== Life ==
Dufour came to notice when her father negotiated with the tenor Michael Kelly and the singer and actress Anna Maria Crouch that they would give her lessons in acting and singing for a share of her salary. She had made her debut at the King's Theatre, Haymarket in 1796 and went on that year to sing at the Pantheon in Oxford Street and in concerts organised by the German impresario Johann Peter Salomon. Her parents broke some agreements to take up a lucrative contract at Drury Lane where she sang well but in was noted that she was quite short and stout and she had poor acting skills.

In 1803 she took to writing. This was how she met her future husband as he was using the same publisher. Jacob Henry Sarratt was known as the "Professor of Chess" and he wrote about that game. Her 1803 novel was "Aurora, or, The Mysterious Beauty" which was not original but based on a French work by J. J. M. Duperche. Duperche's book was not his idea either but it was inspired by a play by F. J. H. von Soden in German. She and Sarratt married at St. Leonard's, church in Shoreditch at the end of 1804. She was his second wife so she inherited two step children. Her new husband became the leading person in chess in London. He would go walking with a friend and they would play chess against each other by remembering all the positions and never using actual chess pieces or a board.

She wrote but did not retire from singing. She appeared at Astley's Amphitheatre during the summer as the leading singer in Astley's company. During the winter she was at the Royalty Theatre, in Wellclose Square. Her last known performance was in 1809 at the Royal Circus on the 30 October. Her husband died in his 40s in 1819 and she arranged for his book on chess to be published in 1821. She later moved to Paris. In 1843 it was reported that a subscription had been created for her benefit. Up to that date she had maintained herself by giving lessons about chess. The subscription appeal attracted donations from chess enthusiasts in England and France including King Louis-Philippe.

Dufour died in Paris in 1846.

== External sites ==
- Corvey Women Writers on the Web author page
