= Domenico Lorenzo Ponziani =

Italian priest, academic, and chess master (1719–1796)

Domenico Lorenzo Ponziani (9 November 1719 – 15 July 1796) was an Italian law professor, priest, chess player, composer and theoretician. He is best known today for his chess writing.

== Life ==
Ponziani was born in Modena in 1719. In 1742 he graduated in law at the University of San Carlo and was admitted to the College of Advocates in 1745. He was Professor of Civil Law at the University of Modena from 1742 to 1772 when he retired taking a pension and the title of honorary professor. In 1764 Ponziani took orders as a priest and in 1766 he became a canon in the Modena Cathedral. He became Vicar General in 1784, received the title of Protonotary Apostolic, and was made Vicar Capitular in 1785. Ponziani died in Modena and is buried in the Modena Cathedral.

== Chess writing ==
Ponziani was friend with fellow Modenese chess players and writers Ercole del Rio and Giambattista Lolli, and collectively the trio is known as the Modenese Masters. In 1769 Ponziani published the first edition of Il giuoco incomparabile degli scacchi (The Incomparable Game of Chess). As Ponziani did not include his name in this work (Opera d'Autore Modenese) it was identified to the Anonymous Modenese. The second edition in 1782 was much improved and laid out the principles of the Italian school of chess as exemplified by 17th-century Italian masters such as Gioachino Greco. Although Ponziani identified himself in the second edition, the 1820 translation by English naval officer J. B. Smith using the pen name J. S. Bingham, The Incomparable Game of Chess, attributed the work to del Rio.

Ponziani's work is the best practical guide produced by the Modenese Masters. Like writings by del Rio and Lolli, Ponziani deals only with the opening and endgame, with no discussion of the middlegame. In the opening, the primary objective is to obtain the maximum amount of mobility for the pieces, aiming in particular for vulnerable points such as the f2 or f7 square. No importance is attached to formation or maintenance of a pawn center—pawns are used to drive back enemy pieces.

In the opening, Ponziani is best known as the eponym of the Ponziani Opening (1.e4 e5 2.Nf3 Nc6 3.c3), although he did not originate it as it was published by Lucena around 1497. His name is properly attached to the Ponziani Countergambit (1.e4 e5 2.Nf3 Nc6 3.c3 f5) in the Ponziani Opening as he published the first analysis in 1782.

== Endgame studies ==
Ponziani 1769

Position: h8 black king, h7 white pawn, g6 white pawn, g3 white king

White to move and win

Ponziani's 1769 manuscript contained the endgame study here with a king and two pawns versus a king. White wins as follows:

1. Kf4 Kg7
2. Kf5 Kh8
3. Kg5

Or Ke6 or Ke5, but not Kf6?? stalemate.

3...Kg7
4. h8=Q+! Kxh8
5. Kf6 Kg8
6. g7 Kh7
7. Kf7 and wins.

Ponziani 1782

Position: g7 white queen, f3 black knight, h3 black bishop, f2 black king, h1 white king

Blockade allows Black to draw

Ponziani (1782) gave an example of an endgame blockade or fortress, in which the inferior side is able to hold a draw despite having only two minor pieces for the queen by hemming in the opposing king. (See Pawnless chess endgames, Queen vs. two minor pieces.)

Ponziani 1782

Position: f8 black king, g7 black rook, e6 white queen, h5 white king

Black to move draws, starting with 1...Rh7+. See Desperado

Another problem from Ponziani (1782).
