= Modenese Masters =

Trio of 18th-century Italian chess writers

The Modenese Masters were three 18th-century chess masters and writers from Modena, Italy:

- Domenico Lorenzo Ponziani (1719–1796)
- Ercole del Rio (1718–1802)
- Giambattista Lolli (1698–1769)

Together they were known as the "Modenese school of chess" (Hooper & Whyld 1992). They recommended playing the Italian Game opening. In contrast to Philidor's idea of pawn structure and mobility, the Modenese school emphasized rapid development of the pieces for an attack on the opposing king, aiming for checkmate or winning material in the process (Sunnucks 1970:309–310).

== See also ==
- School of chess
