= Ponziani Opening =

Chess opening

Position: a8 black rook, c8 black bishop, d8 black queen, e8 black king, f8 black bishop, g8 black knight, h8 black rook, a7 black pawn, b7 black pawn, c7 black pawn, d7 black pawn, f7 black pawn, g7 black pawn, h7 black pawn, c6 black knight, e5 black pawn, e4 white pawn, c3 white pawn, f3 white knight, a2 white pawn, b2 white pawn, d2 white pawn, f2 white pawn, g2 white pawn, h2 white pawn, a1 white rook, b1 white knight, c1 white bishop, d1 white queen, e1 white king, f1 white bishop, h1 white rook
- Moves: 1.e4 e5 2.Nf3 Nc6 3.c3
- ECO: C44
- Origin: c. 1490
- Named after: Domenico Lorenzo Ponziani
- Parent: King's Knight Opening

The Ponziani Opening is a chess opening that begins with the moves:

1. e4 e5
2. Nf3 Nc6
3. c3

It is one of the oldest chess openings, having been discussed in literature by 1497. It was advocated by Howard Staunton, generally considered the world's strongest player from 1843 to 1851, in his 1847 book The Chess-Player's Handbook. For some decades, it was often called "Staunton's Opening" or the "English Knight's Game" as a result. Today, it is usually known by the name of Domenico Lorenzo Ponziani, whose main contribution to the opening was his introduction of the countergambit 3...f5!? in 1769.

Although it is considered inferior to other third move options such as the Ruy Lopez (3.Bb5), it has a reputation for leading to sharp and dynamic play. It is typically only used as a surprise weapon by modern players. The move c3 supports a later d4 push and also enables early development of the queen, with White frequently playing Qa4. Black's usual response is either 3...Nf6 or 3...d5. Magnus Carlsen used it for a victory in 2013.

== History ==
The Ponziani is one of the oldest known openings, having been first discussed in chess literature by no later than 1497. It was mentioned in both of the earliest chess treatises: the Repetición de Amores y Arte de Ajedrez con ci Iuegos de Partido by Lucena and the Göttingen manuscript. Today the opening bears the surname of Domenico Lorenzo Ponziani. Although Ponziani did analyze the opening in 1769, his principal contribution was the introduction of the countergambit 3...f5!? Later the opening was favored by Howard Staunton, who in The Chess-Player's Handbook (1847) called it "so full of interest and variety, that its omission in many of the leading works on the game is truly unaccountable. ... it deserves, and, if we mistake not, will yet attain a higher place in the category of legitimate openings than has hitherto been assigned to it."

=== Nomenclature ===
Staunton cumbersomely referred to the opening as "The Queen's Bishop's Pawn Game in the King's Knight's Opening", as did George H. D. Gossip in The Chess Player's Manual (1888, American edition 1902). Napoleon Marache, one of the leading American players, similarly called it the "Queen's Bishop's Pawn Game" in his 1866 manual. In their treatise Chess Openings Ancient and Modern (1889, 1896), E. Freeborough and the Reverend C.E. Ranken called it "Staunton's Opening". In an appendix to later editions of Staunton's work, R.F. Green, editor of British Chess Magazine, also called it "Staunton's Opening", directing those seeking a definition of "Ponziani's Game" to the former name. Green referred to 3...f5 as "Ponziani's Counter Gambit". Chess historian H. J. R. Murray in his celebrated 1913 work A History of Chess called the opening simply the "Staunton", explaining that he was using "the ordinary names of the Openings as used by English players of the present day". James Mason in his treatise The Art of Chess (Fourth Edition c. 1910?) referred to the opening as the "Ponziani–Staunton Attack". The famous German Handbuch des Schachspiels, which went through eight editions between 1843 and 1916, called it the "Englisches Springerspiel" (English Knight's Game). The Reverend E.E. Cunnington in The Modern Chess Primer (Thirteenth Edition 1933) referred to it as the "Ponziani Opening (sometimes called Staunton's)".

Wilhelm Steinitz, the first World Champion, in his 1895 treatise The Modern Chess Instructor (Part II), called the opening the "Ponziani Opening", as did his successor, Emanuel Lasker, in Lasker's Manual of Chess. Similarly, Frank Marshall in Chess Openings, the authors of Modern Chess Openings (Second Edition 1913), and Siegbert Tarrasch in The Game of Chess (1931, English translation 1938) called it "Ponziani's Opening". William Cook in The Chess Players' Compendium (Fifth Edition 1910) called it "Ponziani's Game", while Francis Joseph Lee and Gossip in The Complete Chess – Guide (1903) called it "Ponziani's Knight's Game". Contemporary authors likewise call it the "Ponziani Opening", "Ponziani's Opening", or simply the "Ponziani".

== Overview ==
Position: a8 black rook, c8 black bishop, d8 black queen, e8 black king, f8 black bishop, g8 black knight, h8 black rook, a7 black pawn, b7 black pawn, c7 black pawn, d7 black pawn, f7 black pawn, g7 black pawn, h7 black pawn, c6 black knight, e5 black pawn, e4 white pawn, c3 white pawn, f3 white knight, a2 white pawn, b2 white pawn, d2 white pawn, f2 white pawn, g2 white pawn, h2 white pawn, a1 white rook, b1 white knight, c1 white bishop, d1 white queen, e1 white king, f1 white bishop, h1 white rook

Ponziani: 1.e4 e5 2.Nf3 Nc6 3.c3

The Ponziani is rarely played today except as a surprise weapon, because Black has the pleasant choice between equalizing easily and attempting to obtain an advantage with sharper play. White's third move prepares to build a powerful pawn center with 4.d4, a logical objective also seen in the more popular Ruy Lopez and Giuoco Piano. However, 3.c3 is somewhat premature because the move: 1) takes away the most natural square for White's queen knight, 2) temporarily creates a hole on d3, and 3) develops a pawn rather than a piece, leaving White behind in development and not well placed to meet a counterattack in the center. Moreover, unlike in the Giuoco Piano, where White's d4 advance attacks Black's king bishop on c5, in the Ponziani d4 will not gain a tempo. On the positive side, the move 3.c3 creates a second diagonal for the white queen.

As early as 1904, Marshall wrote that, "There is no point in White's third move unless Black plays badly. ... White practically surrenders the privilege of the first move." More recently, Graham Burgess called the Ponziani "a relic from a bygone age, popular neither at top level nor at club level". Bruce Pandolfini has said,

Curiously, every great teacher of openings who investigated the Ponziani has concluded that it leads to interesting play and deserves to be played more often. Yet it has never captured the fancy of chessplayers in general, and it remains to be seen whether the Ponziani is an opening of the past or of the future.

In Chess Master vs. Chess Amateur, Max Euwe and Walter Meiden wrote, "What should one do with this opening? It is no opening for beginners, because tactics predominate in the play. There are no simple strategic principles to govern the general lines in this opening."

== Jaenisch Variation: 3...Nf6 ==
Position: a8 black rook, c8 black bishop, d8 black queen, e8 black king, f8 black bishop, h8 black rook, a7 black pawn, b7 black pawn, c7 black pawn, d7 black pawn, f7 black pawn, g7 black pawn, h7 black pawn, c6 black knight, f6 black knight, e5 black pawn, e4 white pawn, c3 white pawn, f3 white knight, a2 white pawn, b2 white pawn, d2 white pawn, f2 white pawn, g2 white pawn, h2 white pawn, a1 white rook, b1 white knight, c1 white bishop, d1 white queen, e1 white king, f1 white bishop, h1 white rook

Jaenisch Variation: 3...Nf6

Position: a8 black rook, c8 black bishop, d8 black queen, e8 black king, f8 black bishop, h8 black rook, a7 black pawn, b7 black pawn, c7 black pawn, d7 black pawn, e7 black knight, f7 black pawn, g7 black pawn, h7 black pawn, d5 white pawn, e5 black pawn, e4 black knight, c3 white pawn, f3 white knight, a2 white pawn, b2 white pawn, f2 white pawn, g2 white pawn, h2 white pawn, a1 white rook, b1 white knight, c1 white bishop, d1 white queen, e1 white king, f1 white bishop, h1 white rook

Jaenisch Variation, traditional line: 4.d4 Nxe4 5.d5 Ne7

3...Nf6 is considered Black's safest course and probably a deterrent to possible Ponziani adopters because positions arise ranging from the highly chaotic to dull passiveness. White's usual response is 4.d4, consistent with the idea behind 3.c3. Black's most common response is then 4...Nxe4, though 4...exd4 is a frequent alternative.

After 4...Nxe4, White usually responds with 5.d5. Black must move the knight to safety with 5...Ne7 or 5...Nb8, or may sacrifice it with 5...Bc5, inviting sharp complications.

=== Traditional line: 4.d4 Nxe4 5.d5 Ne7 ===
5...Ne7 often continues 6.Nxe5 Ng6, (not 6...d6?? when 7.Bb5+! wins material) and now either 7.Qd4 Qf6 8.Qxe4 Qxe5, a more recent try 7.Qf3, or 7.Nxg6 hxg6 8.Qe2 Qe7 9.Bf4 d6 10.Na3 Rh5 11.0-0-0 Rf5 leads to equality according to MCO-15.

Quiet draws are common in this line, though there are reasonable winning chances for White in the type of endgame that emerges. An example draw in the 7.Qd4 line is Medvedev vs. Milgram, ICCF 1991.

=== Retreat line: 5...Nb8 ===
5...Nb8 is also playable; the most common continuation is 6.Nxe5 Qe7 7.Qd4, after which Black has the options of retreating the threatened knight with 7...Nf6 or 7...Nd6, counterattacking with 7...d6 or 7...f6, or defending the knight with 7...f5.

=== Vuković Gambit: 5...Bc5 ===
Position: a8 black rook, c8 black bishop, d8 black queen, e8 black king, h8 black rook, a7 black pawn, b7 black pawn, c7 black pawn, d7 black pawn, f7 black pawn, g7 black pawn, h7 black pawn, c6 black knight, c5 black bishop, d5 white pawn, e5 black pawn, e4 black knight, c3 white pawn, f3 white knight, a2 white pawn, b2 white pawn, f2 white pawn, g2 white pawn, h2 white pawn, a1 white rook, b1 white knight, c1 white bishop, d1 white queen, e1 white king, f1 white bishop, h1 white rook

Vuković Gambit: 3...Nf6 4.d4 Nxe4 5.d5 Bc5

Position: a8 black rook, c8 black bishop, d8 black queen, e8 black king, h8 black rook, a7 black pawn, b7 black pawn, c7 black pawn, d7 black pawn, f7 black pawn, g7 black pawn, h7 black pawn, b6 black bishop, c6 white pawn, d5 white queen, e5 black pawn, c3 white pawn, f3 white knight, a2 white pawn, b2 white pawn, e2 white king, f2 black knight, g2 white pawn, h2 white pawn, a1 white rook, b1 white knight, c1 white bishop, f1 white bishop, h1 white rook

Vuković Gambit after 6.dxc6 Bxf2+ 7.Ke2 Bb6 8.Qd5 Nf2

Position: a8 black rook, f8 black rook, g8 black king, a7 black pawn, b7 white queen, c7 black pawn, d7 black pawn, f7 black pawn, g7 black pawn, h7 black pawn, b6 black bishop, f6 black queen, e5 black pawn, c3 white pawn, f3 white knight, a2 white pawn, b2 white pawn, e2 white king, f2 black knight, g2 white pawn, h2 white pawn, a1 white rook, b1 white knight, c1 white bishop, f1 white bishop, g1 white rook

Vuković Gambit after 9.Rg1 0-0 10.cxb7 Bxb7 11.Qxb7 Qf6

5...Bc5, which has been referred to as the Vuković Gambit or Fraser Defense, is an extremely sharp line where Black allows White to capture the threatened knight. The main line continues 6.dxc6 Bxf2+ 7.Ke2 Bb6 8.Qd5 Nf2 9.Rg1 0-0 10.cxb7 Bxb7 11.Qxb7 Qf6, leaving Black down a knight and bishop for two pawns, including a passed pawn on e5. Black plans to later play ...e4 and kick White's knight on f3. A possible continuation is 12.Na3 e4 13.Nc4 Rab8 14.Qd5 exf3+ 15.gxf3 Rfe8+ 16.Kd2 Ne4+ 17.fxe4 Bxg1=.

9.cxb7 Bxb7 10.Qxb7 Nxh1, returning material, is also seen. 7...bxc6 is also possible for Black, typically continuing 8.Qa4 f5 9.Nbd2.

=== 4...exd4 ===
4...exd4 leads to a position that can also arise in the Göring Gambit. It tends to lead to more double-edged play than after 4...Nxe4. White's usual next move is 5.e5, with the typical replies for Black 5...Nd5 and 5...Ne4.

After 5...Nd5, White's most common response is 6.cxd4, typically followed by 6...Bb4+ 7.Bd2 or 6...d6. The main alternatives are the aggressive developing moves 6.Qb3, 6.Bc4, and 6.Bb5.

After 5...Ne4, White's most common response is 6.Qe2, typically continuing 6...f5 7.exf6 (en passant) d5. 6.cxd4 is the main alternative, which Black may reply to with 6...d5 or 6...Bb4+.

=== Other lines ===
- After 4.d4 exd4 5.e5, 5...Qe7 and 5...Ng4 are occasionally seen alternatives.
- 4.d3 most often continues 4...d5 (4...Be7 is a less aggressive alternative) followed by 5.Nbd2 or 5.Qc2. The line is also frequently reached via 3...d5 4.d3 Nf6. The move d3 locks White's king's bishop inside a pawn chain, so developing it to e2 is typical.

== 3...d5 ==
3...d5 is an aggressive response, striking back in the center. Unlike in some other openings featuring an early 3...d5, such as the Scandinavian Defense, after 4.exd5 Qxd5, White cannot play Nc3, winning a tempo on Black's queen, as White's pawn occupies c3. Instead, the usual move is 4.Qa4, where White indirectly threatens to win Black's e-pawn by pinning the knight. Black must choose either to defend the e-pawn with 4...f6 or 4...Qd6 (but not 4...Bd6, as this blocks Black's queen's protection of the d-pawn), or be prepared to sacrifice a pawn with either 4...Bd7 or 4...Nf6.

=== Steinitz Variation: 4.Qa4 f6 ===
Position: a8 black rook, c8 black bishop, d8 black queen, e8 black king, f8 black bishop, g8 black knight, h8 black rook, a7 black pawn, b7 black pawn, c7 black pawn, g7 black pawn, h7 black pawn, c6 black knight, f6 black pawn, d5 black pawn, e5 black pawn, a4 white queen, e4 white pawn, c3 white pawn, f3 white knight, a2 white pawn, b2 white pawn, d2 white pawn, f2 white pawn, g2 white pawn, h2 white pawn, a1 white rook, b1 white knight, c1 white bishop, e1 white king, f1 white bishop, h1 white rook

Steinitz Variation: 3...d5 4.Qa4 f6

Position: a8 black rook, c8 black bishop, e8 black king, f8 black bishop, h8 black rook, a7 black pawn, b7 black pawn, c7 black pawn, e7 black knight, g7 black pawn, h7 black pawn, c6 black knight, f6 black pawn, b5 white bishop, d5 black queen, e5 black pawn, a4 white queen, c3 white pawn, f3 white knight, a2 white pawn, b2 white pawn, d2 white pawn, f2 white pawn, g2 white pawn, h2 white pawn, a1 white rook, b1 white knight, c1 white bishop, e1 white king, h1 white rook

Steinitz Variation, main line: 5.Bb5 Ne7 6.exd5 Qxd5

4...f6 simply defends Black's central pawn on e5. It is considered solid and best, but unnatural because it stops Black's knight from developing to f6. The line can continue 5.Bb5 Nge7 6.exd5 Qxd5 with either 7.d4, followed by 7...Bd7, 7...Bg4, or 7...e4, or 7.0-0, followed by 7...Bd7 or 7...e4. It is regarded as leading to equal positions.

=== Caro Gambit: 4.Qa4 Bd7 ===
Position: a8 black rook, d8 black queen, e8 black king, f8 black bishop, g8 black knight, h8 black rook, a7 black pawn, b7 black pawn, c7 black pawn, d7 black bishop, f7 black pawn, g7 black pawn, h7 black pawn, c6 black knight, d5 black pawn, e5 black pawn, a4 white queen, e4 white pawn, c3 white pawn, f3 white knight, a2 white pawn, b2 white pawn, d2 white pawn, f2 white pawn, g2 white pawn, h2 white pawn, a1 white rook, b1 white knight, c1 white bishop, e1 white king, f1 white bishop, h1 white rook

Caro Gambit: 3...d5 4.Qa4 Bd7

Position: a8 black rook, d8 black queen, e8 black king, f8 black bishop, h8 black rook, a7 black pawn, b7 black pawn, c7 black pawn, d7 black bishop, g7 black pawn, h7 black pawn, f6 black knight, d5 white pawn, e5 black pawn, c3 white pawn, f3 white queen, a2 white pawn, b2 white pawn, d2 white pawn, f2 white pawn, g2 white pawn, h2 white pawn, a1 white rook, b1 white knight, c1 white bishop, e1 white king, f1 white bishop, h1 white rook

Caro Gambit, main line: 5.exd5 Nd4 6.Qd1 Nxf3+ 7.Qxf3 Nf6

4...Bd7 intends 5...Nd4, a discovered attack on White queen and threatening to double White's pawns after 6...Nxf3+ 7.gxf3. However, White can parry the attack with 6.Qd1. After 5.exd5 Nd4 6.Qd1 Nxf3+ 7.Qxf3 Nf6, Black has thwarted White's initial attack but is down a pawn with an unclear position. Max Euwe considered it unconvincing.

=== Leonhardt Variation: 4.Qa4 Nf6 ===
Position: a8 black rook, c8 black bishop, d8 black queen, e8 black king, f8 black bishop, h8 black rook, a7 black pawn, b7 black pawn, c7 black pawn, f7 black pawn, g7 black pawn, h7 black pawn, c6 black knight, f6 black knight, d5 black pawn, e5 black pawn, a4 white queen, e4 white pawn, c3 white pawn, f3 white knight, a2 white pawn, b2 white pawn, d2 white pawn, f2 white pawn, g2 white pawn, h2 white pawn, a1 white rook, b1 white knight, c1 white bishop, e1 white king, f1 white bishop, h1 white rook

Leonhardt Variation: 3...d5 4.Qa4 Nf6

Position: a8 black rook, c8 black bishop, d8 black queen, e8 black rook, g8 black king, a7 black pawn, c7 black pawn, f7 black pawn, g7 black pawn, h7 black pawn, c6 black pawn, d6 black bishop, f6 black knight, d5 black pawn, a4 white queen, e4 white pawn, c3 white pawn, d3 white pawn, a2 white pawn, b2 white pawn, e2 white bishop, f2 white pawn, g2 white pawn, h2 white pawn, a1 white rook, b1 white knight, c1 white bishop, e1 white king, h1 white rook

Leonhardt Variation, main line: 5.Nxe5 Bd6 6.Nxc6 bxc6 7.d3 0-0 8.Be2 Re8

After 4...Nf6, White can gain material with 5.Nxe5, with theory giving 5...Bd6 6.Nxc6 bxc6 7.d3 0-0 8.Be2 Re8 where Black has compensation for the pawn.

=== Spanish Variation: 4.Bb5 ===
Position: a8 black rook, c8 black bishop, e8 black king, f8 black bishop, h8 black rook, a7 black pawn, b7 black pawn, c7 black pawn, e7 black knight, f7 black pawn, g7 black pawn, h7 black pawn, c6 black knight, b5 white bishop, d5 black queen, a4 white queen, c3 white pawn, f3 white knight, a2 white pawn, b2 white pawn, d2 white pawn, g2 white pawn, h2 white pawn, a1 white rook, b1 white knight, c1 white bishop, e1 white king, h1 white rook

Spanish Variation, main line with ...Qd5: 4...dxe4 5.Nxe5 Qd5 6.Qa4 Ne7 7.f4 exf3 8.Nxf3

Position: a8 white queen, f8 black bishop, g8 black knight, h8 black rook, a7 black pawn, c7 black pawn, e7 black king, f7 black pawn, g7 black pawn, h7 black pawn, e5 white knight, e4 black pawn, c3 white pawn, h3 black bishop, a2 white pawn, b2 white pawn, c2 white king, d2 white pawn, f2 white pawn, h2 white pawn, a1 white rook, b1 white knight, c1 white bishop, f1 black queen

Spanish Variation, main line with ...Qg5: 4...dxe4 5.Nxe5 Qg5 6.Qa4 Qxg2 7.Bxc6+ bxc6 8.Qxc6+ Kd8 9.Rf1 Bh3 10.Qxa8+ Ke7 11.Kd1 Qxf1+ 12.Kc2

4.Bb5 is considered inferior to 4.Qa4 but the game becomes sharp with chances for both sides, although Black may emerge with advantage after 4...dxe4! 5.Nxe5 Qg5! 6.Qa4 Qxg2, where White may continue with 7.Bxc6+ or 7.Rf1.

Another common option for Black is 5...Qd5, which typically continues 6.Qa4 Ne7 7.f4 (or 7.Nxc6) exf3 8.Nxf3. Black also has the alternative moves 7...Be6 and 7...Bd7.

=== Other lines ===
- After 4.Qa4, another option is 4...Qd6, protecting e5 without weakening the pawn structure. Batsford Chess Openings 2 gives the move an exclamation mark but does not mention the reply 5.d4, the main move in the later Nunn's Chess Openings.
- After 4.Qa4, 4...dxe4 typically continues 5.Nxe5 Qd5 6.Nxc6 bxc6 7.Bc4 Qd6. This line is common among newcomers to the Ponziani.

== Ponziani Countergambit: 3...f5 ==
Position: a8 black rook, c8 black bishop, d8 black queen, e8 black king, f8 black bishop, g8 black knight, h8 black rook, a7 black pawn, b7 black pawn, c7 black pawn, d7 black pawn, g7 black pawn, h7 black pawn, c6 black knight, e5 black pawn, f5 black pawn, e4 white pawn, c3 white pawn, f3 white knight, a2 white pawn, b2 white pawn, d2 white pawn, f2 white pawn, g2 white pawn, h2 white pawn, a1 white rook, b1 white knight, c1 white bishop, d1 white queen, e1 white king, f1 white bishop, h1 white rook

Ponziani Countergambit: 3...f5

Position: a8 black rook, c8 black bishop, d8 black queen, e8 black king, f8 black bishop, g8 black knight, h8 black rook, a7 black pawn, b7 black pawn, c7 black pawn, d7 black pawn, g7 black pawn, h7 black pawn, c6 black knight, e5 white knight, d4 white pawn, e4 black pawn, c3 white pawn, a2 white pawn, b2 white pawn, f2 white pawn, g2 white pawn, h2 white pawn, a1 white rook, b1 white knight, c1 white bishop, d1 white queen, e1 white king, f1 white bishop, h1 white rook

Ponziani Countergambit, main line: 4.d4 fxe4 5.Nxe5

3...f5 is an aggressive Black response originally suggested by the 18th-century Italian writer Ponziani. In 1951, Boris Spassky chose this countergambit against Yakov Estrin. The countergambit was successfully played in a grandmaster game between Hikaru Nakamura and Julio Becerra Rivero at the US Championship 2007.

The most common continuation is for White to strike in the center with 4.d4. This is typically followed by 4...fxe4 5.Nxe5, after which Black may play 5...Qf6, 5...Nf6, or 5...Nxe5. White may also accept Black's pawn with 4.exf5, with the typical continuation 4...e4 5.Nd4 Nf6.

The countergambit is considered better for White after 4.d4 fxe4 5.Nxe5 Qf6 6.Ng4 Qg6 7.Bf4 or 5...Nf6 6.Bg5.

== Other lines ==
- 3...Nge7 is the unusual Kmoch Variation, advocated by Hans Kmoch. According to Reuben Fine, citing analysis by Kmoch, Black equalizes after 4.d4 exd4 5.Bc4 d5 6.exd5 Nxd5 7.0-0 Be7 8.Nxd4 Nxd4 9.cxd4 Be6. The variation has also been attributed to Richard Réti due to him having tried it against Savielly Tartakower, though he lost. Recent analysis gives White the edge, i.e. 1.e4 e5 2.Nf3 Nc6 3.c3 Nge7 4.Bc4 (immediately targeting f7) d5 5.exd5 Nxd5 and now either 6.0-0 or 6.Qb3 lead to a White advantage. Also playable for White is 4.Bb5 which transposes to a line of the Cozio Defense to the Ruy Lopez.
- 3...d6 reinforces the e5-pawn and intends to show that c3 was unnecessary. It is considered passive, however, and does not present White with any problems. White's most common next move is 4.d4. Alternatives include 4.Bb5, which transposes to the Ruy Lopez, and 4.Bc4, which transposes to the Italian Game.
- 3...Be7 is another passive variation that White typically responds to with 4.d4.
- 3...Bc5?! is typically met with 4.d4 or 4.b4, both of which force the bishop to move again.

== Illustrative games ==
Here are two games illustrating the wild tactical play that often develops in the 3...d5 4.Qa4 f6 5.Bb5 Ne7 line:

Chigorin vs. Gossip, 1889

Position: a8 black rook, f8 black bishop, h8 black rook, a7 black pawn, b7 black pawn, c7 black pawn, d7 black bishop, e7 black king, f7 white bishop, g7 black pawn, h7 black pawn, c6 black knight, g6 black knight, a5 black queen, f5 black pawn, d4 white pawn, e4 black pawn, b3 white queen, c3 white pawn, a2 white pawn, b2 white pawn, d2 white knight, f2 white pawn, g2 white pawn, h2 white pawn, a1 white rook, b1 white knight, c1 white bishop, f1 white rook, g1 white king

Position after 12...Ke7?
- Mikhail Chigorin vs. George H.D. Gossip, New York 1889:
  1. e4 e5 2. Nf3 Nc6 3. c3 d5 3...Nf6 is the safest response if Black is not well versed in the ensuing complications—as Gossip proves not to be. 4. Qa4 f6 5. Bb5 Ne7 6. exd5 Qxd5 7. 0-0 7.d4! is the main line today. 7... Bd7? 7...e4! 8.Ne1 Bf5 9.f3 leads to equality. 8. d4 e4 9. Nfd2 Ng6? 9...f5! or 9...0-0-0 was better. 10. Bc4 Qa5 11. Qb3 f5? 11...0-0-0! was the best chance. 12. Bf7+ Ke7? 12...Kd8 is forced. 13. Nc4! Setting up a problem-like finish. 13... Qa6 14. Bg5+! Kxf7 15. Nd6# 1–0 Black's king cannot escape the double check.
- S. Kaouras vs. R. Vorlop, e-mail 2003:
  1. e4 Nc6 2. Nf3 e5 3. c3 d5 4. Qa4 f6 5. Bb5 Nge7 6. exd5 Qxd5 7. d4 7.0–0 is considered the main line, e.g. 7...Bd7 8.d4 a6!? (8...exd4 9.cxd4 Ne5 10.Bxd7+ Qxd7 is equal) 9.c4 Qf7 10.d5 Nb8 11.Bxd7+ Nxd7 12.Nc3 Nf5 13.b4 gave White the advantage in S. Hassan–B. Amin, Cairo 2003. 7... e4 Alternatives are the old move, 7...Bd7, and 7...Bg4, which is currently popular at the international level. 8. c4 Qd7 9. Nfd2 Qxd4 10. 0–0 Bd7 11. Nc3 a6 12. Nb3 Qe5 13. c5 f5 14. g3 Ng6 15. Rd1 Be7 16. Bc4 Nd4 Now White appears to be in deep trouble. 17. Qxd7+! The best practical choice, which inspires White to play very aggressively. 17... Kxd7 18. Be3 Nh4 If 18...Kc8, 19.Bxd4 traps Black's queen. 19. gxh4 Kc8 20. Bxd4 White has three pieces for the queen and the initiative; Black's pieces are uncoordinated. 20... Qf4 21. Be6+ Kb8 22. Ne2 Qf3 23. Ng3 Bxh4 24. Be3 g6 24...f4? 25.Nd2 traps the queen. 25. Rd7 Bf6 26. c6 b5 27. Rd5 Re8 28. Nc5 Bg7 29. Rad1! White creates a mating net by threatening Rd8+. 29... Ka7 30. Rd7 Be5 31. Bxf5 gxf5 32. Nb7+ Qxe3 33. fxe3 Having regained the queen, White has a winning material advantage. 33... f4 34. exf4 Bxf4 35. Nd6 Bxd6 36. R1xd6 Kb6 37. Rd1 Re6 38. Re1 e3 39. Rxh7 Rae8 40. Rg7 Kxc6 41. Re2 Re5 42. Nf1 Kd5 43. Kg2 c5 44. Rg3 Kd4 45. h4 c4 46. Rexe3 Rxe3 47. Nxe3 Kd3 48. Kh3 Kd2 49. Nd5 Kc1 50. Rg2 Re5 51. Nf4 b4 52. h5 Kb1 53. h6 Re8 54. Kg4 Rh8 55. Kg5 c3 56. bxc3 bxc3 57. Rh2 c2 58. Nd3 1–0 Notes based on those by International Master Gary Lane.

== See also ==
- List of chess openings
- List of chess openings named after people
