= Ghulam Kassim =

Indian chess player

Ghulam Kassim (birth date unknown, died Madras 1844) was an Indian chess player and author of the early 19th century, best known today for a variation of the King's Gambit that bears his name. In colonial India, several native forms of chess were popular; Ghulam Kassim was one of the first Indian players to achieve a degree of proficiency at the western form of the game. Almost nothing is known about his life; Howard Staunton noted in the Illustrated London News of 26 April 1845 that he had died "within the last few months".

== Madras vs Hyderabad correspondence chess match ==
Ghulam Kassim was a leading member of the Madras Chess Club. In 1828 and 1829, Madras played two correspondence games against the Hyderabad Chess Club. These are the earliest recorded games from India played according to western rules, and are among the earliest recorded correspondence games. The Hyderabad team was led by a strong player named Shah Sahib who unfortunately died soon after the match began; his replacement Row Sahib was considered much inferior. Under the leadership of Ghulam Kassim, Madras won both games.

== Book, and the Ghulam Kassim Gambit ==
Position: a8 black rook, b8 black knight, c8 black bishop, d8 black queen, e8 black king, f8 black bishop, g8 black knight, h8 black rook, a7 black pawn, b7 black pawn, c7 black pawn, d7 black pawn, f7 black pawn, h7 black pawn, c4 white bishop, d4 white pawn, e4 white pawn, f4 black pawn, g4 black pawn, f3 white knight, a2 white pawn, b2 white pawn, c2 white pawn, g2 white pawn, h2 white pawn, a1 white rook, b1 white knight, c1 white bishop, d1 white queen, e1 white king, h1 white rook

Ghulam Kassim Gambit
Position after 1.e4 e5 2.f4 exf4 3.Nf3 g5 4.Bc4 g4 5.d4!?

Another member of the Madras team was James Cochrane, a British civil servant (not to be confused with the strong Scottish player John Cochrane, who was also in India at the time). With assistance from Cochrane, Ghulam Kassim published in 1829 a short book entitled Analysis of the Muzio Gambit, and match of two games at Chess, Played between Madras and Hyderabad, with Remarks by Ghulam Kassim, of Madras, who had the Chief Directorate of the Madras Games, and James Cochrane, Esq. of the Madras Civil Service.

The first part of the book contained detailed analysis of the King's Gambit variation 1.e4 e5 2.f4 exf4 3.Nf3 g5 4.Bc4 g4 5.d4!?, which he advocated as superior to the more common 5.0-0 (the Muzio Gambit). This opinion is not shared by modern opening theory; however, his analysis was well regarded and was cited by Howard Staunton as well as the German Handbuch des Schachspiels. The line is now known as the Ghulam Kassim Gambit, and is regarded as distinct from the Muzio Gambit.

The second part of the book contained analysis of the two games between the Madras and Hyderabad chess clubs; the final section contained a short analysis of the Scotch Game and of the Italian Game.
