= Hessian State Library =

Hessian State Library may refer to:

- Wiesbaden State Library
- Hessian State and University Library Darmstadt, renamed in 2004 to University and State Library Darmstadt
