= Ercole del Rio =

Italian lawyer and author (c. 1716-c. 1802)

Ercole del Rio, 1750 (?)

Position: a8 black king, c7 black queen, d6 black pawn, g6 white knight, a5 white knight, g5 white pawn, c4 white bishop, c2 white king

White to move and draw
Solution: 1.Ne7! d5 2.Nec6 dxc4 3.Kc3 and 4.Kxc4 positional draw

Domenico Ercole del Rio (c. 1718 – c. 1802) was an Italian lawyer and author. He published a 110-page chess book in 1750 which was the basis of a work by Giambattista Lolli thirteen years later. He composed many chess problems. He was one of the Modenese Masters. He was known as "the Devil who could never be beaten".

== See also ==
- Wrong bishop
