= Giovanni Leonardo Di Bona =

Italian chess master

Giovanni Leonardo di Bona
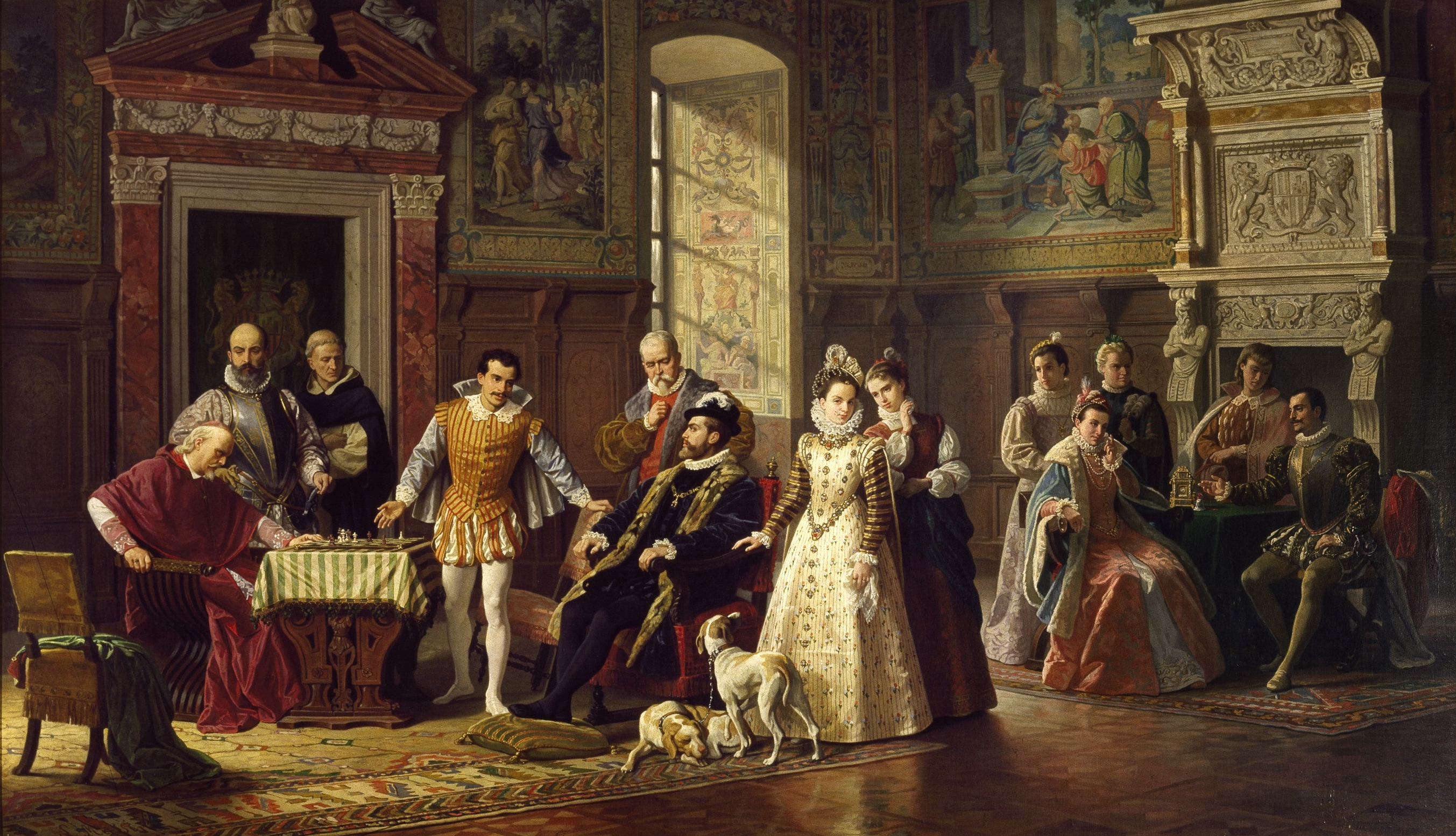
- Leonardo di Cutro (center-right) defeats Ruy López in Spain

Personal information
- Born: Giovanni Leonardo di Bona; 1533 Cutro, Calabria, Kingdom of Naples
- Died: August 2, 1578 (aged c. 45) Taranto, Kingdom of Naples

Chess career
- Country: Kingdom of Naples

Giovanni Leonardo di Bona or Giovanni Leonardo da Cutro (both given names can also be seen in the reversed order Leonardo Giovanni), known as Il Puttino (Italian: Small Child) (1533–1578), was an early Italian chess master.

Giovanni Leonardo was born in Cutro, Calabria. He studied law in Rome. In 1560, he lost a match to Ruy López in Rome. In the years 1566–1572, he traveled and played chess in Rome, Genoa, Marseille, and Barcelona. He had played many times against Paolo Boi in Italy, and they were regarded as being equal in strength.

Traveling with another strong player of his time, Giulio Cesare Polerio, Leonardo won the first known international master tournament in Madrid in 1575, becoming the strongest chess master of the time. After their success at the Court of Spain, Leonardo and Boi both travelled, albeit separately, to Lisbon, where they tested their skill against Il Moro, the eminent chess champion of King Don Sebastian, of Portugal. Again, they both succeeded—first Leonardo, soon followed by Boi—in defeating Il Moro.

After defeating López in Spain, he asked for his town Cutro to be forgiven of taxes and called Cutro the "City of Chess," where every year, this event is remembered on a traditional day in August.

And again, the King was generous with his rewards. After this triumph, Leonardo, having been called the wandering knight (Il Cavaliere errante) by King Don Sebastian, left Portugal to return to Italy and settle in Naples, where he became the chess master for the Prince of Bisignano.

Although only a small number of his games have reached us, we are certain that he did not play chess like his peers, who were all aggressive attackers. Instead, he was a slow, positional player who consistently favored sound tactics over spectacular combinations.
