= Jacob Sarratt =

English chess player

Jacob Henry Sarratt (1772 – 6 November 1819) was one of the top English chess players of the late 18th and early 19th centuries. Sarratt was renowned as a player and author and adopted the title "Professor of Chess". He was the first professional player to teach chess in England. He introduced into England the chess rule that a stalemate is a draw, which was commonly used on the continent of Europe. He coined with his works of 1813 and 1821 the term Muzio Gambit. He was a pupil of Verdoni and later the teacher of William Lewis and Peter Unger Williams.

In 1803 he met Camilla Dufour, a singer who was writing for the same publisher. He and Dufour married at St. Leonard's, church in Shoreditch at the end of 1804. She was his second wife so she inherited his two children. Her new husband became the leading person in chess in London. He would go walking with Hippolyte de Bourblanc and they would play chess against each other by remembering all the positions and never using actual chess pieces or a board.

== Writings ==
- Life of Buonaparte, 1803 (an attack on the tyrant)
- A Treatise on the Game of Chess. London 1808 (vol. 1)
- The works of Damiano, Ruy-Lopez, and Salvio on the game of chess. London 1813
- The Works of Gianutio and Gustavus Selenus, 1817
- A New Treatise on the Game of Chess. London 1821 (vol.1)
- A New Treatise on the Game of Chess. London 1828 (vol.1)
