= Paolo Boi =

Italian chess player

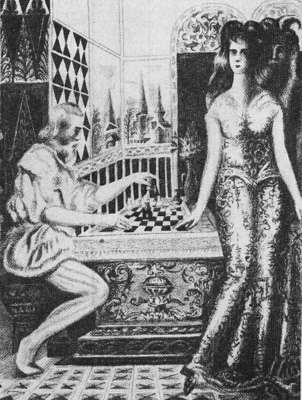
- Paolo Boi in a sketch from a British book (before 1898)

Personal information
- Born: Paolo Boi; 1528 Syracuse, Italy
- Died: 1598 (aged c. 70) Naples, Italy

Chess career
- Country: Italy
- Title: GM noble

Paolo Boi (1528–1598) was an Italian chess player. He is considered to have been one of the greatest chess players of the 16th century. In 1549, he beat Pope Paul III in a chess match.

== Early life ==
He was born in Syracuse, Sicily (now Italy), and he was brought up for the church under the belief that Paolo would become a pope and a saint, because of a prediction. However, Paolo formed different plans: he started to learn chess, and a few years later he escaped to Greece, then to Saragossa, and finally returned to Sicily as a well-known chess player.

== Career ==
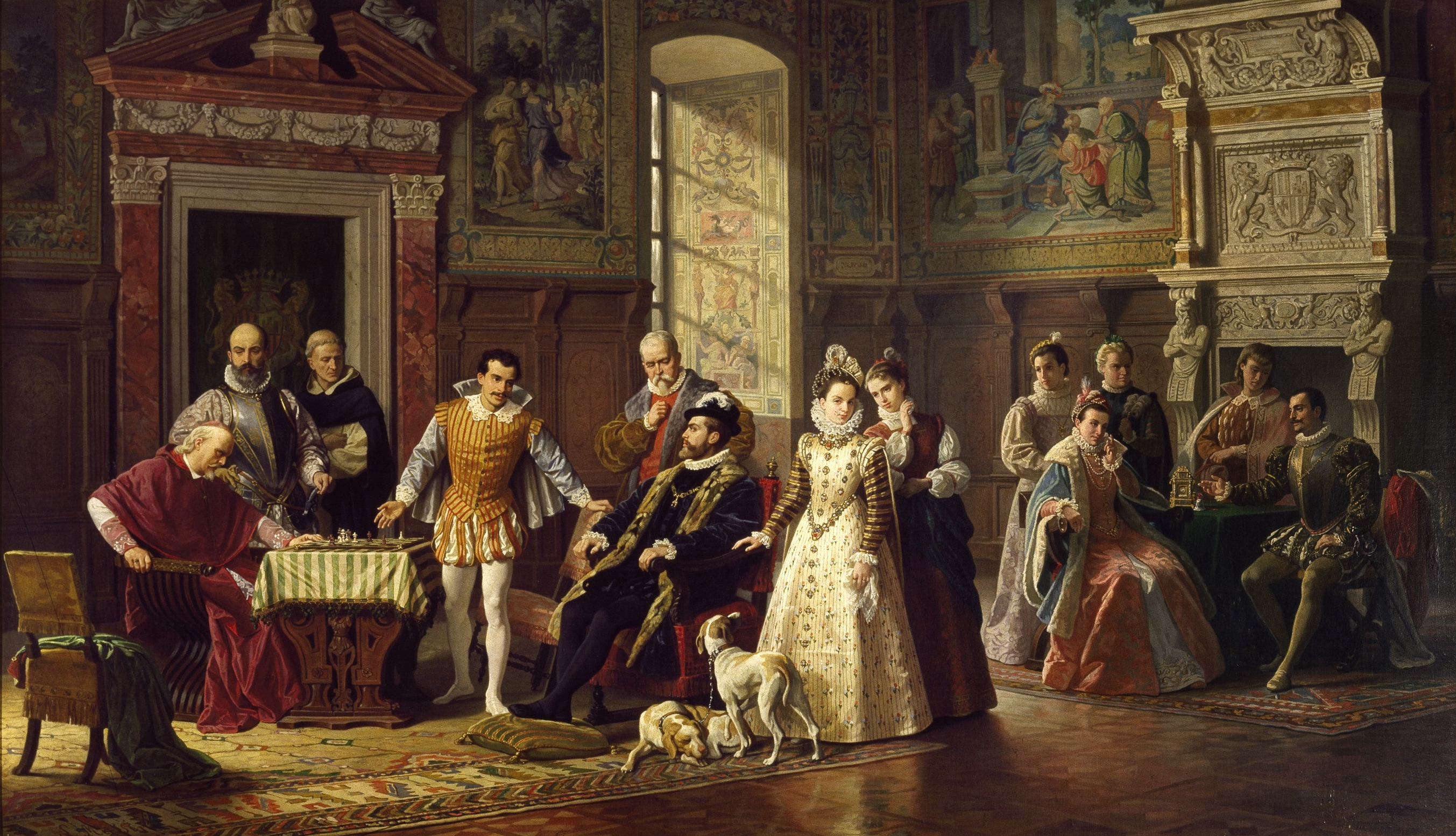
Chess tournament at the court of the king of Spain

He had played several times against Giovanni Leonardo Di Bona in Italy, and the two chess players were considered equal. Then Paolo Boi and Giovanni Leonardo Di Bona defeated the strongest chess player of their time, the famous Spanish player Ruy López de Segura, at the first known international chess tournament in the court of Philip II of Spain at Madrid, in 1575. As a result, they became the strongest chess players of the era, and henceforth the two were called the "Light" and "Lustre" of the noble game.

The chess treatises created by Boi were not preserved. A small number of his chess games have survived to the present time, such as the opening of his game against the chess player Scovara, which gained fame, but only the first fourteen moves have survived.

He was the first who, without seeing the board, played three games at once, and at the same time conversed with other parties upon different topics. In France, Catherine de Medici, who was also adept at chess, showered favours upon him; and, in Portugal, he had the honour of having the King Don Sebastian for his adversary.

== Death ==
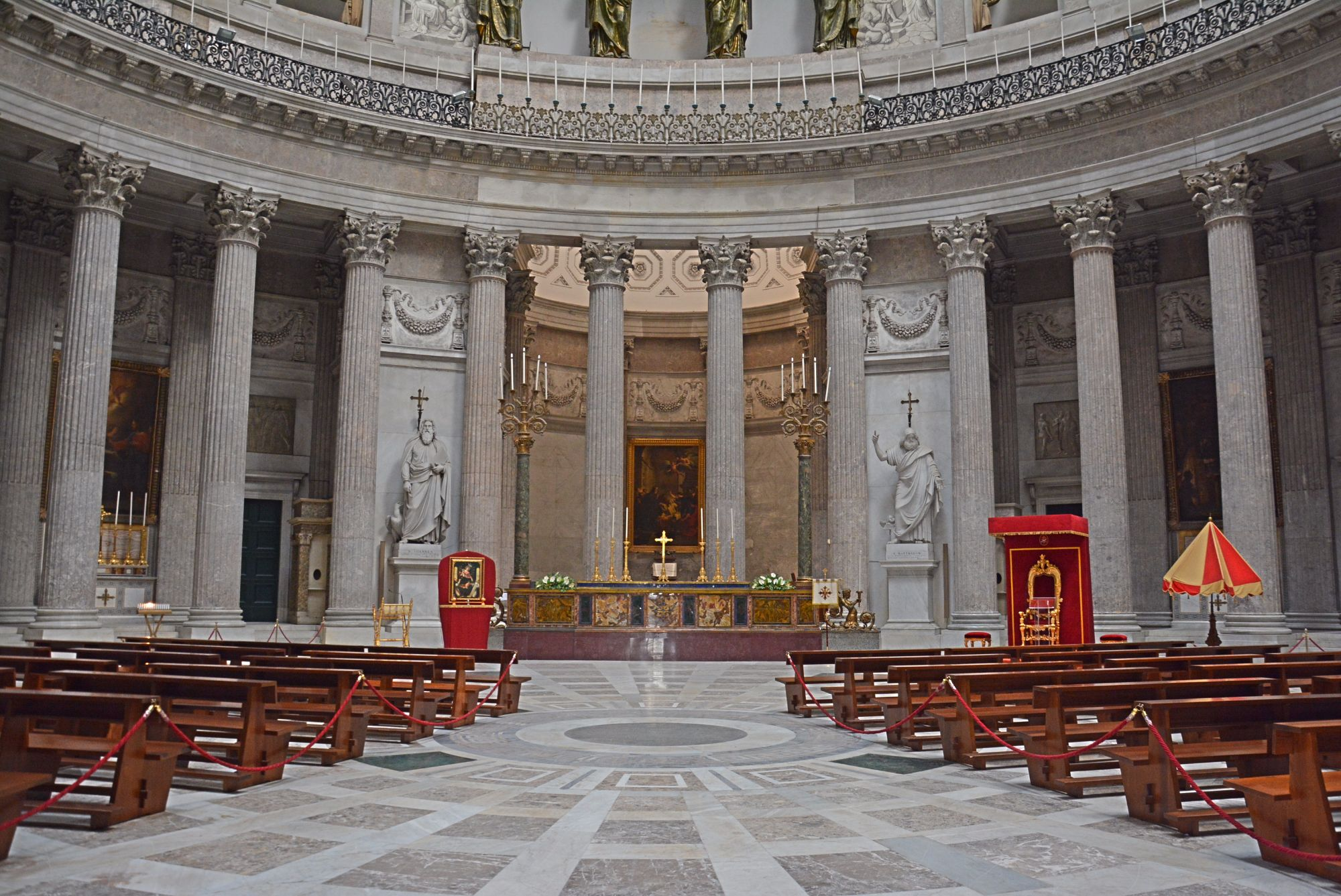
Basilica of Saint Francesco di Paola, where the chess player is buried

Boi died in Naples. Historian H. J. R. Murray says he was poisoned by jealous rivals. Other sources say he caught a cold when hunting and died as a result of it. His body was buried in the church of Saint Francesco di Paola; Prince Stigliano and many of the Neapolitan nobility followed him to the grave.
