= Alessandro Salvio =

Italian chess player

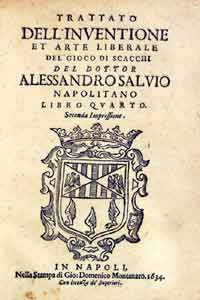

Personal information
- Born: Alessandro Salvio c. 1575 Naples
- Died: c. 1640 (aged c. 70)

Chess career
- Country: Italy

Alessandro Salvio (c. 1575 – c. 1640) was a leading Italian chess player in the early 17th century. He started a chess academy in Naples, and wrote a book called Trattato dell'Inventione et Arte Liberale del Gioco Degli Scacchi, which was published in Naples in 1604. He also wrote Il Puttino published in 1634. According to JH Saratt's translation, Il Puttino was first published in 1604, and republished in 1634.

== Salvio Gambit ==
The Salvio Gambit is a gambit in the King's Gambit Accepted. It is as follows; 1.e4 e5 2.f4 exf4 3.Nf3 g5 4.Bc4 g4 5.Ne5 Qh4+ 6.Kf1.

== See also ==
- Lucena position

== Bibliography ==
- Hooper, David; Whyld, Kenneth (1992), The Oxford Companion to Chess (2nd ed.), Oxford University Press, ISBN 0-19-280049-3
