= Giambattista Lolli =

Italian chess player (1698–1769)

Personal information
- Born: Giovanni Battista Lolli; 1698 Nonantola
- Died: 4 June 1769 (aged 70–71)

Giambattista Lolli (1698 – 4 June 1769) was an Italian chess player and one of the most important chess theoreticians of his time. He is most famous for his book Osservazioni teorico-pratiche sopra il giuoco degli scacchi (English: Theoretical-practical views on the game of chess), published 1763 in Bologna. Born in Nonantola, Modena, he was one of the Modenese Masters. The checkmate pattern "Lolli's mate" involves infiltrating an opponent's fianchetto position using both a pawn and queen, and is named after Giambattista Lolli.

== Openings ==
Lolli Gambit
Position: a8 black rook, b8 black knight, c8 black bishop, d8 black queen, e8 black king, f8 black bishop, g8 black knight, h8 black rook, a7 black pawn, b7 black pawn, c7 black pawn, d7 black pawn, f7 white bishop, h7 black pawn, e4 white pawn, f4 black pawn, g4 black pawn, f3 white knight, a2 white pawn, b2 white pawn, c2 white pawn, d2 white pawn, g2 white pawn, h2 white pawn, a1 white rook, b1 white knight, c1 white bishop, d1 white queen, e1 white king, h1 white rook
- Moves: 1.e4 e5 2.f4 exf4 3.Nf3 g5 4.Bc4 g4 5.Bxf7+
- ECO: C37
- Origin: 1620
- Parent: Open Game
- Synonym: Wild Muzio Gambit

Lolli's book contains analyses of chess openings, in particular the Giuoco Piano. Against the Two Knights Defense, the line 1.e4 e5 2.Nf3 Nc6 3.Bc4 Nf6 4.Ng5 d5 5.exd5 Nxd5 6. d4 is named the Lolli Variation. In the King's Gambit the variation 1.e4 e5 2.f4 exf4 3.Nf3 g5 4.Bc4 g4 5.Bxf7+ is designated the Lolli Gambit. It illustrates the Italian masters' style of uncompromising attack, which clearly differs from the rather more strategic considerations taken by, for example, the French chess player Philidor. However, it is considered obsolete as Black can obtain the advantage by 5...Kxf7 6.Ne5+ Ke8 7.Qxg4 Nf6 8.Qxf4 d6, and White does not have enough for the piece. (The Muzio Gambit, 5.O-O, is more promising).

== Endgames ==
In addition, the book contains listings of 100 chess endgames. One of these positions was used by Wilhelm Heinse in his novel Anastasia und das Schachspiel (English: Anastasia and the game of chess). This Lolli Position is from the pawnless endgame of a rook and bishop versus a rook. Although this endgame is a draw in general, White to move wins in this position. Lolli also studied some defensive fortresses and the queen versus pawn endgame.

Lolli position

Position: b8 black rook, c4 white bishop, d4 white king, g2 white rook, c1 black king

White to move wins
with 1.Kc3 or 1.Kd3
