= Krege =

Krege is a German surname. Notable people with the surname include:

- Sandra Krege (born 1987), German chess master
- Wolfgang Krege (1939–2005), German author and translator
