= Saint Petersburg 1895–96 chess tournament =

The Saint Petersburg 1895–96 chess tournament was one of the strongest chess tournaments of the 19th century.

The top five finishers at the Hastings 1895 chess tournament were invited: Harry Nelson Pillsbury, Mikhail Chigorin, Emanuel Lasker, Siegbert Tarrasch and William Steinitz. Lasker was World Chess Champion and Steinitz had been world champion before losing the championship to Lasker in 1894. Tarrasch declined his invitation due to work commitments (he was a doctor), so the other four players played a 6-round round-robin.

The first half of the tournament began on December 13, 1895, and the second half began on January 4, 1896.

Pillsbury took an early lead, and at the halfway point the scores were: Pillsbury 6½, Lasker 5½, Steinitz 4½, Chigorin 1½. Pillsbury collapsed in form halfway through the tournament, however, for reasons that have been widely speculated. Garry Kasparov has suggested that, had Pillsbury won the tournament, he could well have forced a world championship match against Lasker.

In the end Lasker won, with Steinitz second. This allowed Steinitz to raise support for a World Championship rematch between Lasker and Steinitz in 1897, which Lasker won.

== Crosstable ==
Saint Petersburg 1895–96
#	Player	1	2	3	4	Total
1	Emanuel Lasker (German Empire)	—	11½01½	00½1½½	1½11½1	11½
2	William Steinitz (United States)	00½10½	—	1½½111	01100½	9½
3	Harry Pillsbury (United States)	11½0½½	0½½000	—	11100½	8
4	Mikhail Chigorin (Russian Empire)	0½00½0	10011½	00011½	—	7
