= Vladimir Sveshnikov =

Latvian chess player (born 1986)

Personal information
- Full name: Vladimirs Svešņikovs; Vladimir Evgenyevich Sveshnikov
- Born: 6 May 1986 (age 40) Riga, Latvia

Chess career
- Country: Latvia
- Title: International Master (2011)
- FIDE rating: 2417 (July 2026)
- Peak rating: 2440 (May 2012)

Vladimir Sveshnikov (Latvian: Vladimirs Svešņikovs, Russian: Владимир Евгеньевич Свешников, romanized: Vladimir Yevgenyevich Sveshnikov; born 6 May 1986) is a Latvian chess player. He was awarded the International Master title in 2011.

== Biography and career ==
Born in Riga, Vladimir Sveshnikov is the eldest son of Russian grandmaster Evgeny Sveshnikov. As a junior, he was Latvian champion in the under-14 age category. He was the best Latvian player in the Riga Technical University Open 2011, in which he finished third. Sveshnikov won the Latvian Chess Championship in 2016.

He played for the Latvian team in the 39th Chess Olympiad in 2010 and 42nd Chess Olympiad in 2016.

In 2015, together with his father, he wrote the book A Chess Opening Repertoire for Rapid and Blitz, published in English and Russian.
