= Sergey Pavlov (chess player) =

Ukrainian chess player

Personal information
- Born: 26 September 1987 (age 38)

Chess career
- Country: Ukraine
- Title: International Master (2008)
- FIDE rating: 2464 (July 2026)
- Peak rating: 2539 (September 2010)

Sergey Valeriovych Pavlov (ukr.: Сергій Валерійович Павлов) (born 26 September 1987) is a Ukrainian chess player who holds the title of International Master (IM, 2008). Ukrainian Chess Championship winner in 2010.

== Chess career ==
Two times Kyiv chess championship winner (2005, 2008). In 2008 he was awarded the FIDE International Master (IM) title. In 2009 in Kyiv Sergey Pavlov won Nabokov Chess Memorial. In 2010 in Alushta he won Ukrainian Chess Championship. In 2010 he won 2nd place in 17th Ukrainian Team Chess Championship with team "Rivne Forest Bisons". In 2013 he won 3rd place in 20th Ukrainian Team Chess Championship with team "Bratstvo Kyiv". In August 2017 Sergey Pavlov won 2nd place in "RTU Open" "A" tournament.
