= Erik Blomqvist (chess player) =

Swedish chess grandmaster (born 1990)

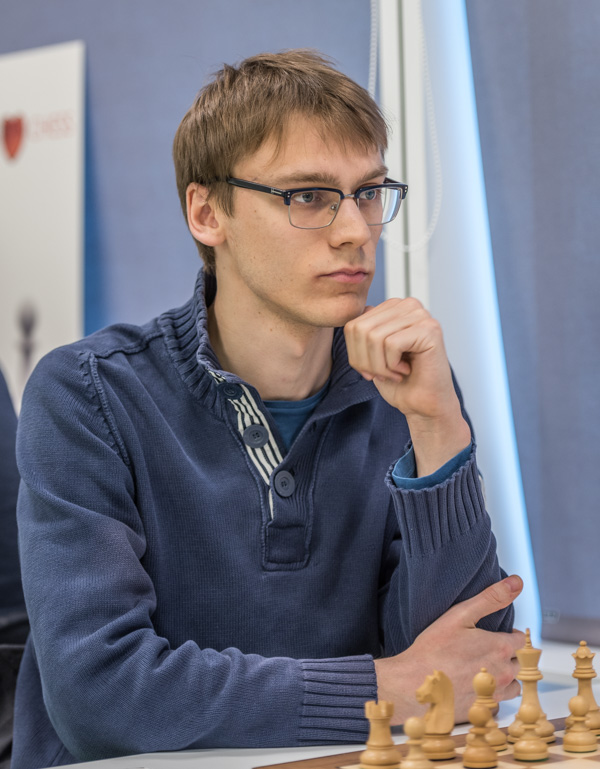
- Blomqvist in 2016

Personal information
- Born: 19 October 1990 (age 35) Stockholm, Sweden

Chess career
- Country: Sweden
- Title: Grandmaster (2013)
- FIDE rating: 2487 (July 2026)
- Peak rating: 2574 (January 2017)

Erik Blomqvist (born 19 October 1990) is a Swedish chess grandmaster. He is a two-time Swedish Chess Champion.

== Chess career ==
Born in 1990, Blomqvist earned his international master title in 2008 and his grandmaster title in 2013.

He won the Swedish Chess Championship in 2016 with a score of 7½/9 (+6–0=3), two points ahead of runner-up Nils Grandelius. In 2016 he also won the Nordic Chess Championship. He won the Swedish Championship again in 2019. He was the No. 6 ranked Swedish player as of July 2020.

In August 2022, he finished third in the Riga Technical University Open "A" tournament. In August 2023, he finished second in the Riga Technical University Open "A" tournament.
