= Sandra Krege =

German chess player (born 1987)

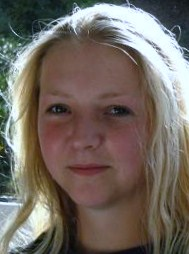
- Sandra Krege in 2004

Personal information
- Born: 31 August 1987 (age 38)

Chess career
- Country: Germany
- Peak rating: 2114 (October 2005)

Sandra Krege (born 31 August 1987) is a German chess player who won Open German Women's Chess Championship (2004) and German Women's Chess Championship (2005).

== Youth Tournaments ==
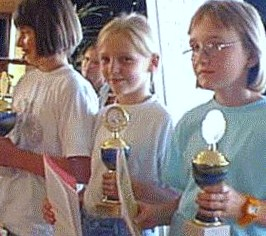
The top three of the U11s in Oberhof 1998: Friederike Wolk, Sandra Krege, Maria Schöne

In 1998, Sandra Krege became vice champion of the girls at the German Youth Chess Championships in group U11, behind Friederike Wolk and ahead of Maria Schöne. A year later she played at the World Youth Chess Championship 1999 in the age group U12 girls in Oropesa del Mar, which Nana Dzagnidze won.

In 1999 in Dresden Sandra Krege took part an international match for the U14 girls between England and Germany. In 2000 she played in a country comparison in London, which was played with 2 teams of four: U14 girls (Franziska Beltz, Sarah Brethauer, Sandra Krege, [Maria Schöne) and U12 girls (Judith Fuchs, Annett Hofmann, Melanie Ohme, Anne Reiske).

At the Girls World Chess Championship in group U14, in 2000 in Oropesa del Mar she scored 6.5 out of 11. In 2001 at the German Youth Chess Championship for girls U14 in Willingen she came second behind Maria Schöne. In the German Youth Chess Championships for girls U16 in 2002 in Winterberg, which Maria Schöne won, she took 6th place. She was also in 6th place in 2003 in the same age group in Willingen, Helene Romakin was first. In 2004 she played at the German Youth Chess Championship for girls in age group U18 in Willingen and came 6th again, Stefanie Schulz won the championship.

== Open and women's tournaments ==
She played her first Open in 1998 in Kassel and got 2.5 points from 7 games, Bernd Rechel won ahead of Lev Gutman and Viesturs Meijers. In 2003 she competed for Saxony-Anhalt at the German Women's Team Championship of the State Associations in Naumburg.

In 2004 she won the 'Open German Women's Chess Championship in Osterburg in front of Tatiana Melamed.
In 2005 she was first at the German Women's Chess Championship in Bad Königshofen ahead of Luba Kopylov.

== Chess Women's Bundesliga ==
Sandra Krege played in the 1. Chess Women's Bundesliga in the Season 2001/02 and from the Season 2004/05 to the Season 2007/08 as a guest player for the Volksbank Halle (from 2006 USV Volksbank Halle), with whom she in 2007 won the Chess Women's Bundesliga.
