= World Chess Championship 1896–1897 =

	Defending champion	Challenger
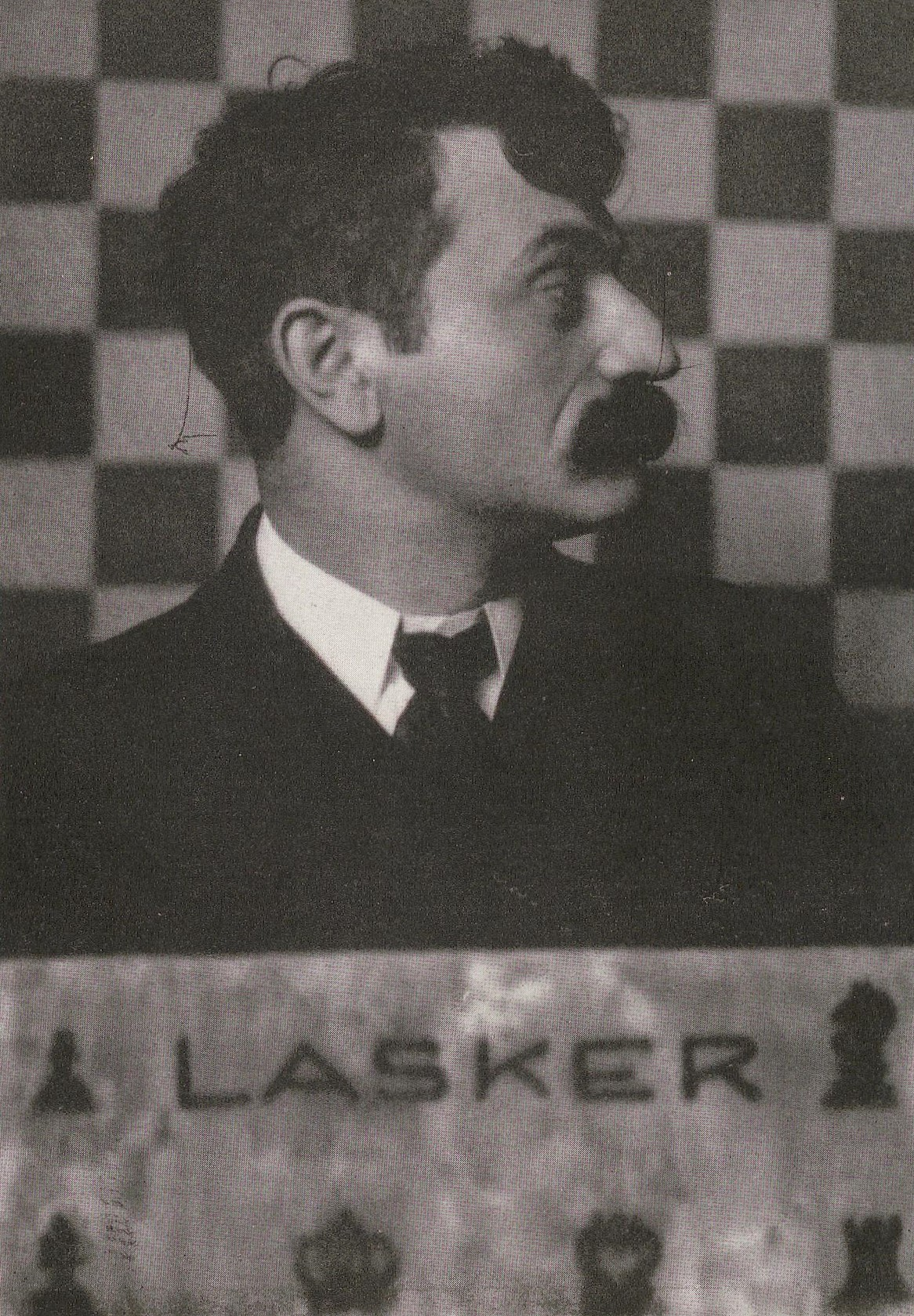
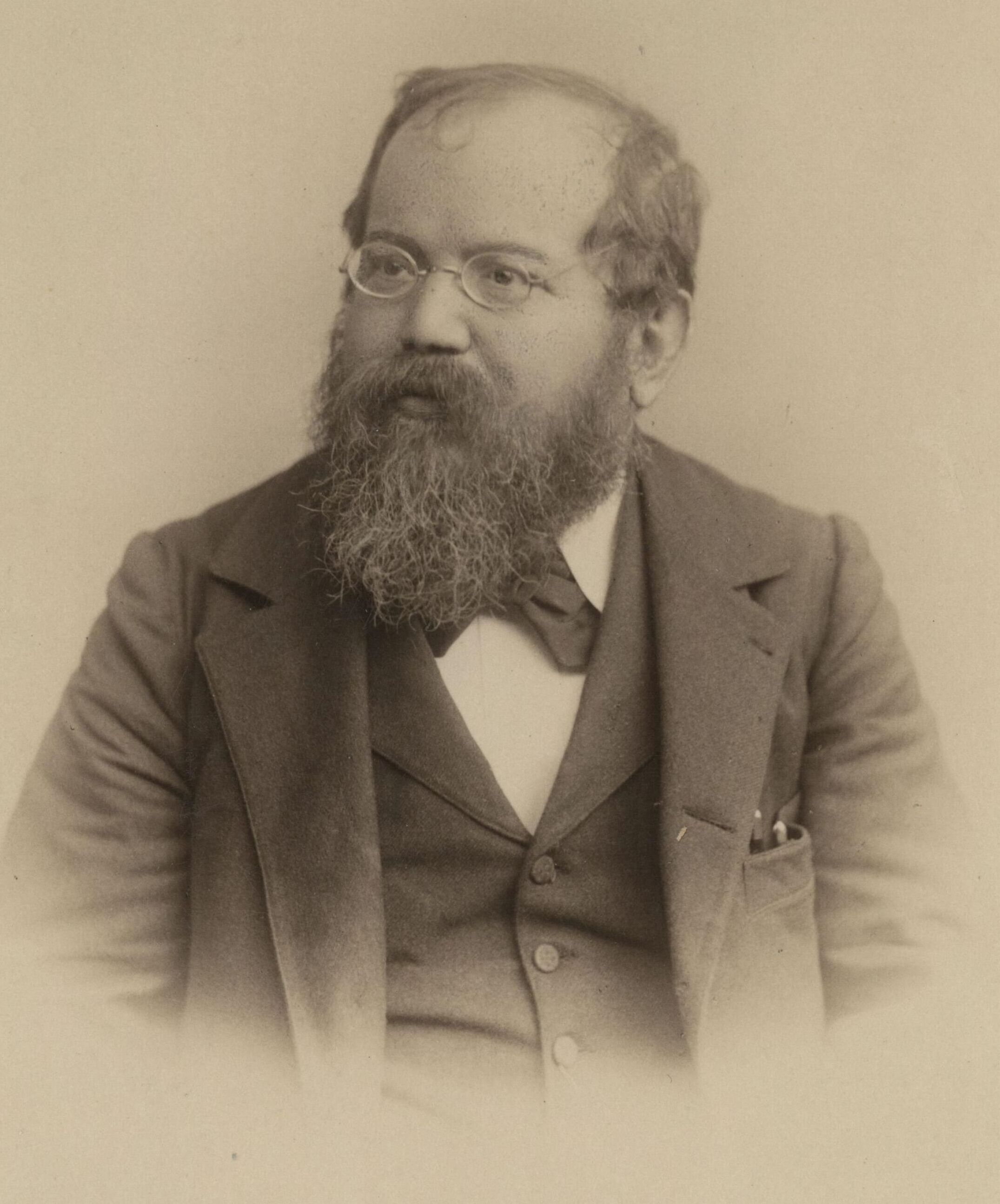
	Emanuel Lasker	Wilheilm Steinitz
	(German Empire) Emanuel Lasker	(United States) Wilhelm Steinitz
12½	Scores	4½
	Born 24 December 1868; 27/28 years old	Born 14 May 1836; 60 years old

The World Chess Championship 1896–1897 was a match for the World Chess Championship, contested between Emanuel Lasker and Wilhelm Steinitz. It was played in Moscow between November 6, 1896, and January 14, 1897. Lasker won by a score of 10 wins to 2, with 5 draws, thus retaining his title.

== Background ==
Lasker had won the world title from Steinitz in 1894, and this was his first time defending the world title. At the Saint Petersburg 1895–96 chess tournament, Steinitz came second behind Lasker, ahead of other potential challengers Harry Nelson Pillsbury and Mikhail Chigorin. This allowed Steinitz to raise support for a rematch.

== Results ==
The first player to win 10 games would be champion. Lasker won by 10 games to 2, with 5 draws.

World Chess Championship Match 1897
	1	2	3	4	5	6	7	8	9	10	11	12	13	14	15	16	17	Wins	Total
William Steinitz (United States)	0	0	0	0	=	0	=	=	=	0	0	1	1	0	=	0	0	2	4½
Emanuel Lasker (Germany)	1	1	1	1	=	1	=	=	=	1	1	0	0	1	=	1	1	10	12½

Steinitz–Lasker, game 17

Position: b8 black rook, h8 black king, d7 black queen, g7 black pawn, h7 black pawn, a6 black pawn, c6 black bishop, f6 black pawn, g6 black knight, a5 white pawn, e5 black pawn, b4 white bishop, c4 white bishop, d4 black rook, b3 white queen, g3 white pawn, b2 white pawn, e2 white rook, f2 white pawn, g2 white pawn, e1 white rook, g1 white king

Steinitz played 35.Qc3?, allowing Lasker to play 36...Bxg2! 37.Kxg2 Qc6+ 38.Re4 Rxe4 39.Rxe4 Qxe4+, gaining a decisive advantage and retaining his World Championship title.
