= Arman Mikaelyan =

Armenian chess grandmaster (born 1996)

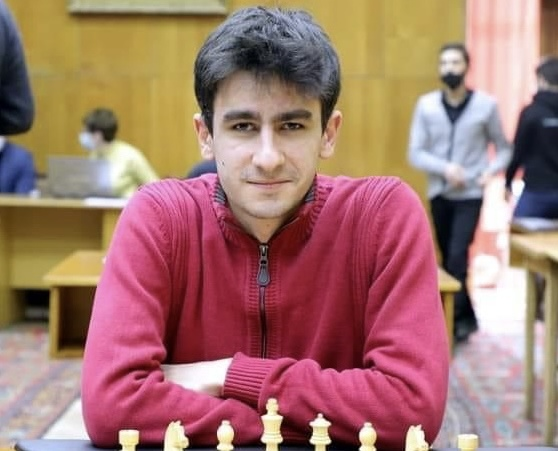

Personal information
- Born: 25 November 1996 (age 29) Yerevan, Armenia

Chess career
- Country: Armenia
- Title: Grandmaster (2017)
- FIDE rating: 2511 (July 2026)
- Peak rating: 2560 (September 2022)

Arman Mikaelyan (Armenian: Արման Միքայելյան; born 25 November 1996) is an Armenian chess Grandmaster (2017).

== Career ==
In 2011, he became the Vice-champion of the World Youth U16 Chess Olympiad. Arman Mikaelyan won silver medal in Armenian Chess Championship in 2015. In August 2019, he finished third in the Riga Technical University Open "A" tournament. He tied for first place at the World Open in 2022.

In 2015, Arman Mikaelyan was awarded the FIDE International Master (IM) title and received the FIDE Grandmaster (GM) title two years later.

== Achievements ==
- Six time Armenian youth medalist (in 2006, 2010, 2011, 2012, 2013, 2014)
- 2009: Champion (U-14), Vice-champion (U-16) "Jermuk-2009" International Open Chess Tournament Under-16
- 2010: Tied for 3rd place at the European Youth Chess Championship
- 2011: Vice-champion of the World Youth U16 Chess Olympiad
- 2014: 3rd place at the 75th Armenian Ch. The 1st League
- 2014: 3rd place at the Armenian Club Championship
- 2015: Vice-champion of the Highest League of Armenia
- 2016: Bronze medal at the Nana Aleksandria Cup
- 2017: Bronze medal at the 2nd Yerevan Open
- 2019: Bronze medal at the Riga Technical University Open
- 2019: Bronze medal at the 4° International Festival Roma Città Aperta
- 2021: Tied for 1st place at the Yerevan Open
- 2022: Winner of the Lone Star Open
- 2022: 3rd place at the 14th Foxwoods Open
- 2022: Tied for 1st place at the World Open
- 2022: Winner of the 27th annual Pacific Coast Open
- 2022: Winner of the Hollywood Chess GM Norm Classic
- 2022: Winner of the Las Vegas Open
- 2022: Tied for 2nd place at the North American Open
- 2023: Winner of the 1000GM LA GM Norm Invitational
- 2023: 2nd place at the Western Class
- 2023: Tied for 2nd place at the World Open
- 2023: Winner of the 28th annual Pacific Coast Open
- 2023: Winner of the Las Vegas Open
- 2023: Winner of the Los Angeles Open
- 2023: Winner of the 58th American Open
- 2024: Tied for 1st place at the Western Class
- 2024: 2nd place at the 33rd Annual Chicago Open
- 2024: Tied for 1st place at the 1000GM Super Swiss
