= World Chess Championship 1894 =

Chess match between Wilheilm Steinitz and Emanuel Lasker

	Defending champion	Challenger
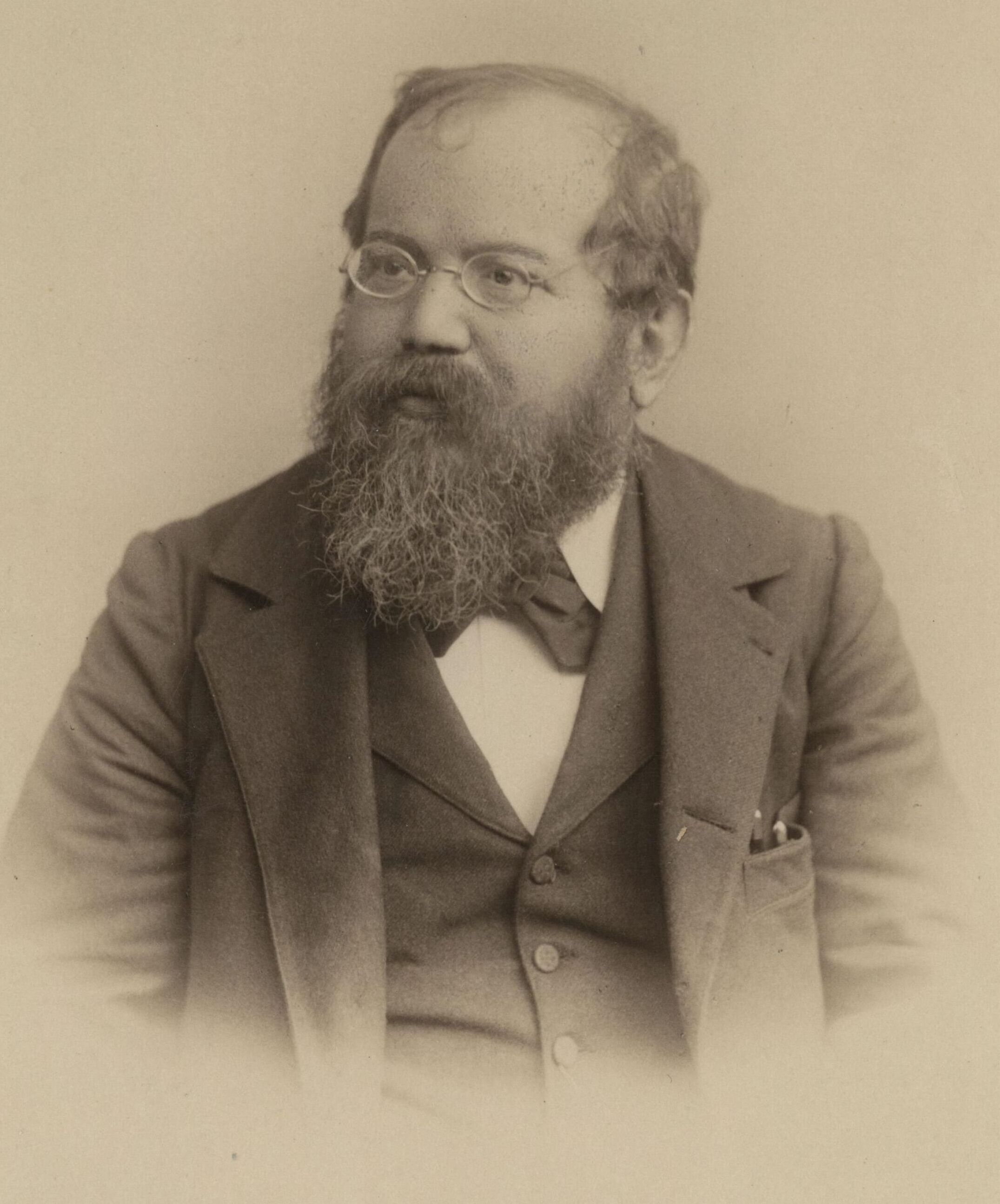
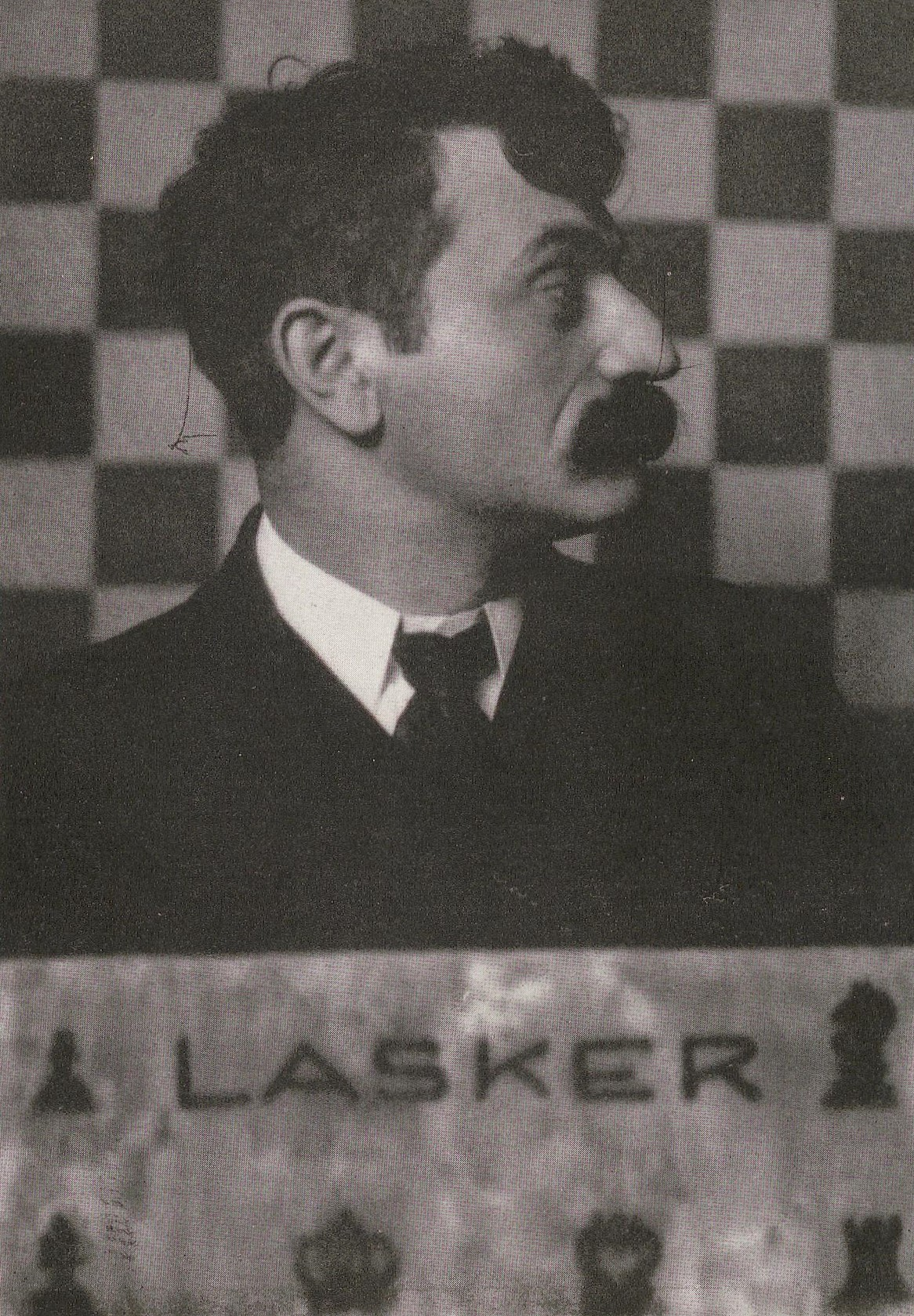
	Wilheilm Steinitz	Emanuel Lasker
	(United States) Wilhelm Steinitz	(German Empire) Emanuel Lasker
7	Scores	12
	Born 14 May 1836; 57/58 years old	Born 24 December 1868; 26 years old

The fifth World Chess Championship was held in New York City (games 1–8), Philadelphia (games 9–11), and Montreal (games 12–19), and was contested from 15 March to 26 May 1894. Holder William Steinitz lost his title to challenger Emanuel Lasker, who was 32 years his junior.

Lasker challenged Steinitz after moving to the United States, which the latter accepted, after having publicly contemplated retirement. Lasker had made a name for himself by having defeated several elite European players, including Curt von Bardeleben (1889) and Joseph Henry Blackburne (1892). The two agreed the match would be won by the first to ten wins.

Though the match began with Steinitz consistently tying the score, Lasker pulled ahead convincingly from game 7 with five consecutive wins. Though Steinitz played several more wins after this point, he failed to equalise, and the match ended with Lasker scoring his tenth win on May 26, 1894.

The two would go on to rematch in 1896, with Lasker defeating Steinitz for a second time.

== Background ==
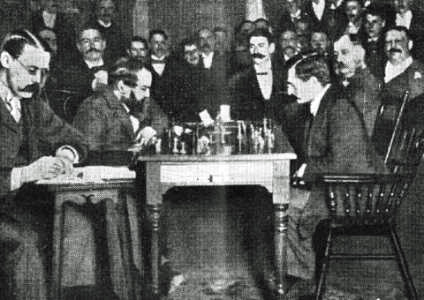
From the World Championship Match (New York 1894) Wilhelm Steinitz (left) vs. Emanuel Lasker (right)

Reigning World Champion Steinitz publicly spoke of retiring; Lasker challenged him, and he changed his mind.

World Championship matches at this time typically involved negotiation as to the stakes, conditions and length of the match, as at the time, top-level chess had no central governing body. The agreed format was that the players would each select two seconds and a referee in each city, which were agreed to be New York, Philadelphia, and Montreal. The match would be won by the first to reach ten wins.

As for the prize, initially Lasker wanted to play for $5,000 a side and a match was agreed at stakes of $3,000 a side, but Steinitz agreed to a series of reductions when Lasker found it difficult to raise the money, and the final figure was $2,000 each, which was less than for some of Steinitz's earlier matches (the final combined stake of $4,000 would be worth about $495,500 at 2007 values). Although this was publicly praised as an act of sportsmanship on Steinitz's part, he may have desperately needed the money.

The first eight games were played in New York, with the next three being played in Philadelphia, and the last eight were played in Montreal.

== Results ==
The first player to win ten games would be champion.

World Chess Championship Match 1894
	1	2	3	4	5	6	7	8	9	10	11	12	13	14	15	16	17	18	19	Wins	Total
Emanuel Lasker (Germany)	1	0	1	0	½	½	1	1	1	1	1	½	0	0	1	1	0	½	1	10	12
William Steinitz (United States)	0	1	0	1	½	½	0	0	0	0	0	½	1	1	0	0	1	½	0	5	7

Lasker won the Championship.

Steinitz managed to maintain balance until the 6th game, and then Lasker won all the games from the 7th to the 11th. This streak was attributed by International Master Jack Peters to Lasker's skill at converting queenless middlegames;

Lasker had noticed signs of uncertainty in Steinitz' handling of "simplified" middlegames, without Queens. Recognizing the champion's superiority in managing a full army of pieces, Lasker deliberately sought early Queen exchanges. This strategy certainly worked in Philadelphia.
(Chess Life, December 1994, p. 40)

When the match resumed in Montreal, Steinitz looked in better shape and won the 13th and 14th games. Lasker struck back in the 15th and 16th, and Steinitz was unable to compensate for his losses in the middle of the match. Hence Lasker won with ten wins, five losses, and four draws. Some commentators thought Steinitz's habit of playing "experimental" moves in serious competition was a major factor in his downfall.

== Games ==
=== Game 1: Lasker–Steinitz, 1–0 ===
Lasker–Steinitz, game 1

Position: e8 black rook, f8 black rook, g8 black king, a7 black pawn, b7 black pawn, c7 black pawn, g7 black pawn, h7 black pawn, d6 black pawn, g6 black knight, d5 white pawn, e5 black pawn, f5 black queen, g5 black bishop, a4 black knight, b4 white pawn, c4 white pawn, g3 white pawn, a2 white pawn, c2 white knight, d2 white bishop, e2 white queen, f2 white pawn, h2 white pawn, c1 white rook, e1 white knight, f1 white rook, g1 white king

Position after 37...Bc7?! This led to the sequence 38.Nd3 Rg5 39.Nb4 Ree5 40.Rd4 Bb6 41.Rxf4+ putting Lasker a pawn up and giving him an advantage. He did not play completely accurately following this though, as after 41...Kg8, he forwent the best move Nc2 in favour of Nd3, though he nevertheless maintained his advantage.

Steinitz played the opening named for him, 3...d6, with Lasker introducing the novelty with 6.Bc4. Both players after this points in their turn faced potential attacks, with Steinitz neutralising the immediate threat of the novelty, and Lasker being forced to play defensively after 12...Be6, after which the game continued roughly equally until 37...Bc7?! which enabled Lasker to win a pawn on move 41. Though this placed Lasker in a convincing lead, he failed to capitalise immediately by playing 42.Nd3 instead of 42.Nc2, which Steinitz described as a move that "wins easily". The game was adjourned after move 50, and reconvened the next day at 3 o'clock. Steinitz went down the exchange, and made a last-ditch effort to save his position with 53...d3, which leaves White with the only move Rg1 to play for a win, which Lasker found.

Steinitz said of the game:

Mr.Lasker then broke into my game in the most woful [sic] manner and won a Pawn, blocking my pieces, and he had things almost all his own way. He, however, gave me, needlessly, another chance of a counter attack by dislodging his Rook, but after the adjournment till next day, he recovered ground and the first move he made in answer to mine on resumption of the play was one which completely disorganized my game.

Lasker spoke to the press very little about the game.

Ruy Lopez, Steinitz Defence (ECO C62)
1.e4 e5 2.Nf3 Nc6 3.Bb5 d6 4.d4 Bd7 5.Nc3 Nge7 6.Bc4 Nxd4 7.Nxd4 exd4 8.Qxd4 Nc6 9.Qe3 Ne5 10.Bb3 c6 11.Qg3 Ng6 12.h4 Be6 13.Bxe6 fxe6 14.Bg5 Be7 15.0-0-0 e5 16.Be3 0-0 17.Ne2 Rf7 18.h5 Nf4 19.Bxf4 exf4 20.Qf3 Qa5 21.Kb1 Qe5 22.Nd4 Bf6 23.c3 Re8 24.Rhe1 Bd8 25.Qg4 Bc7 26.Nf3 Qf6 27.Nd2 Rfe7 28.f3 d5 29.Rh1 Re5 30.g3 Rg5 31.Qd7 Qf7 32.Qxf7+ Kxf7 33.g4 Bb6 34.exd5 cxd5 35.Nb3 Re3 36.Rhf1 Rge5 37.Nc1 Bc7 38.Nd3 Rg5 39.Nb4 Ree5 40.Rd4 Bb6 41.Rxf4+ Kg8 42.Nd3 Re2 43.Rd1 Be3 44.Rb4 b6 45.Ra4 a5 46.b4 d4 47.c4 Bd2 48.b5 Bc3 49.Rg1 Rd2 50.f4 Rxg4 51.Rxg4 Rxd3 52.c5 Re3 53.Rc4 d3 54.Rg1 d2 55.Rd1 bxc5 56.b6 Bd4 57.b7 Re8 58.Kc2 Rb8 59.Rb1 Kf7 60.Ra4 1–0

=== Game 2: Steinitz–Lasker, 1–0 ===
The game was delayed by a day to May 18, as Steinitz had a cold. In this game, Lasker played into the Berlin Defence. After Steinitz played 12.Ng5, the pressure on Lasker's position began mounting, and following 15..h6 16.Qf3, Steinitz promised an attack along the h-file if Lasker captured his knight.Steinitz's attack only strengthened from there, and he won material through a tactic following 27.Rxg6!

Ruy Lopez, Berlin Defence (ECO C65)
1.e4 e5 2.Nf3 Nc6 3.Bb5 Nf6 4.d3 d6 5.c3 Bd7 6.Ba4 g6 7.Nbd2 Bg7 8.Nc4 0-0 9.Ne3 Ne7 10.Bb3 c6 11.h4 Qc7 12.Ng5 d5 13.f3 Rad8 14.g4 dxe4 15.fxe4 h6 16.Qf3 Be8 17.Bc2 Nd7 18.Nh3 Nc5 19.Nf2 b5 20.g5 h5 21.Nf5 gxf5 22.exf5 f6 23.g6 Nxg6 24.fxg6 Bxg6 25.Rg1 e4 26.dxe4 Kh7 27.Rxg6 Kxg6 28.Qf5+ Kf7 29.Qxh5+ Kg8 30.Qxc5 Qe5 31.Be3 a6 32.a4 Rfe8 33.axb5 axb5 34.Qxe5 Rxe5 35.Ra6 Rc8 36.Ng4 Re7 37.Bc5 Ree8 38.Ne3 Bf8 39.Bd4 Kf7 40.h5 Be7 41.Bb3+ Kf8 42.Nf5 1–0

=== Game 3: Lasker–Steinitz, 1–0 ===
This game saw Steinitz playing his eponymous defence once again, and Lasker altered the course of play with 6..exd4 instead of Nxd4. With 17..f6, Steinitz allowed Lasker to plant his knight on e6 on move 21, and shortly afterwards the latter played a sequence winning him a pawn and a piece. The game was adjourned after the 45th move at 11 o'clock to be resumed at 3 the next day. This may explain Lasker's choice of 46.Rxd3, which though still advantageous, is inferior to either king move. As his move was sealed, it would've been beneficial to play something that Steinitz would be less likely to prepare for. The next day, Lasker played a better endgame, and Steinitz eventually played 51..Rg5?, which loses to 52.f7 and an unstoppable passed pawn. Steinitz referred to this move as, "an awful blunder", and suggested he could've played for a draw by instead playing Kd7.

Ruy Lopez, Steinitz Defense (ECO C62)
1.e4 e5 2.Nf3 Nc6 3.Bb5 d6 4.d4 Bd7 5.Nc3 Nge7 6.Bc4 exd4 7.Nxd4 Nxd4 8.Qxd4 Nc6 9.Qe3 Ne5 10.Bb3 Be6 11.f4 Nc4 12.Qg3 Nb6 13.Be3 c6 14.f5 Bxb3 15.axb3 Nd7 16.Bf4 Qc7 17.b4 f6 18.Ne2 Ne5 19.Nd4 Qb6 20.c3 0-0-0 21.Ne6 Rd7 22.Be3 Qb5 23.Rxa7 b6 24.Ra8+ Kb7 25.Rxf8 Rxf8 26.Nxf8 Qd3 27.Rf1 Qc2 28.Bd2 Re7 29.Ne6 Qxe4+ 30.Qe3 Qxg2 31.b3 Re8 32.Qe2 Qh3 33.Kd1 Ra8 34.Rf2 Ra2 35.b5 c5 36.Nxg7 d5 37.Kc1 Qd3 38.Qxd3 Nxd3+ 39.Kb1 Rb2+ 40.Ka1 Rxb3 41.Rf3 c4 42.Ne8 Nb4 43.Rg3 Ra3+ 44.Kb1 Rb3+ 45.Kc1 Nd3+ 46.Rxd3 cxd3 47.Nxf6 Rxb5 48.Ne8 Kc6 49.f6 d4 50.Ng7 dxc3 51.Bxc3 Rg5 52.f7 1–0

=== Game 4: Steinitz–Lasker, 1–0 ===
Lasker–Steinitz, game 4

Position: a8 black rook, f8 black rook, g8 black king, a7 black pawn, b7 black pawn, c7 black pawn, g7 black pawn, h7 black pawn, d5 black pawn, h5 black queen, b4 white pawn, d4 white pawn, g4 black bishop, h4 black bishop, c3 white knight, e3 white pawn, f3 white knight, g3 white pawn, b2 white pawn, h2 white pawn, a1 white rook, b1 white bishop, d1 white queen, f1 white rook, g1 white king

Position after 18...Qa5, leading to the sequence 19.Nxd5 Rxf3 20.Nf4 Rxf4 21.Qb3+ Rf7 22.Rxf7 Qxf7 23.Ba2 Qxb3 24.Bxb3+ Kf8 25.gxh4

In this game, Steinitz played the main line of the Giuoco Piano, an unusual opening for him. Lasker, also unusually, played 8..Be7, in order to divert the usual play in the opening. Steinitz captured exf6 en passant on the 11th move, giving up a passed pawn to strengthen his attack. On move 19 Steinitz took the black d-pawn with his knight, though he had the option to play the sacrifice 19.Be4, dislodging the d-pawn (19..dxe4) instead and allowing the sequence 20.Qb3+ Kh8 21.Nxh4. Steinitz later suggested that the best course of action in this position would have been removing the tension by playing gxh4 right away. Following this, though lasker considered 19...Bxg3 20.hxg3 Bxf3 21.Rxf3 Rxf3 22.Kg2, which leads to a pin and a capture chain that White gets the better of.

After 32...Kxd7, the king and rook endgame saw Steinitz a pawn up, and held the advantage until 51.hxg5?? leading to a drawn position, though he regained the advantage a few moves later, with Lasker playing 53...Ra3+?, allowing the king to come to the defence of his connected passed pawns.

Giuoco Piano (ECO C50)
1.e4 e5 2.Nf3 Nc6 3.Bc4 Bc5 4.c3 Nf6 5.d4 exd4 6.e5 d5 7.Bb5 Ne4 8.cxd4 Be7 9.Nc3 0-0 10.Bd3 f5 11.exf6 Nxf6 12.Be3 Nb4 13.Bb1 Ng4 14.a3 Nxe3 15.fxe3 Bh4+ 16.g3 Bg4 17.0-0 Qe8 18.axb4 Qh5 19.Nxd5 Rxf3 20.Nf4 Rxf4 21.Qb3+ Rf7 22.Rxf7 Qxf7 23.Ba2 Qxb3 24.Bxb3+ Kf8 25.gxh4 Ke7 26.Bd5 c6 27.Be4 a6 28.Ra5 h6 29.b5 cxb5 30.Bxb7 Ra7 31.Bc6 Bd7 32.Bxd7 Kxd7 33.Kf2 Kc6 34.Ke2 Kb6 35.Ra1 a5 36.Kd3 a4 37.e4 Rf7 38.e5 Rf3+ 39.Ke4 Rf2 40.Rb1 Kc6 41.d5+ Kd7 42.Kd4 Rd2+ 43.Kc5 Rc2+ 44.Kxb5 Re2 45.e6+ Kd6 46.Rd1 Rxb2+ 47.Kxa4 Rxh2 48.Re1 Ra2+ 49.Kb5 Ra8 50.Kc4 g5 51.hxg5 hxg5 52.Kd4 Ra4+ 53.Kd3 Ra3+ 54.Ke4 g4 55.Kf5 Ra8 56.e7 Re8 57.Kf6 g3 58.Kf7 Kd7 59.d6 g2 60.Rg1 1–0

=== Game 5: Lasker–Steinitz, ½–½ ===
In this game, Steinitz switched out 9...Ne5, as he had played in the first and third games for the stronger 9...Be6. He puts pressure on the queenside with 16...a5. Lasker is better after 22...Rad8 23.Rd4. The move 24.exd5 was sealed by Lasker and the game was adjourned until the next day. He had to make four moves in six minutes following 27.Bxg6?!, which explains its inaccuracy. If the h-pawn had taken the bishop, 28.Rh4 would have led to a stronger attack. He deliberated for 33 minutes on 31.Qf3, the only move to play for a draw and prevent 31...Re2. Though Steinitz was up a pawn by the end, a draw was still agreed.

Ruy Lopez, Steinitz Defence (ECO 62)
1.e4 e5 2.Nf3 Nc6 3.Bb5 d6 4.d4 Bd7 5.Nc3 Nge7 6.Bc4 exd4 7.Nxd4 Nxd4 8.Qxd4 Nc6 9.Qe3 Be6 10.Nd5 Be7 11.Bd2 0-0 12.0-0 Ne5 13.Bb3 Bxd5 14.Bxd5 c6 15.Bb3 Nd7 16.Rad1 a5 17.c3 a4 18.Bc2 Re8 19.Qh3 Nf8 20.Be3 Qa5 21.a3 Qb5 22.Bc1 Rad8 23.Rd4 d5 24.exd5 Bc5 25.Rf4 Ng6 26.c4 Qa6 27.Bxg6 fxg6 28.Rh4 h5 29.Bg5 Rd6 30.dxc6 Qxc6 31.Qf3 Qxf3 32.gxf3 Re2 33.Bc1 Rxf2 34.Rxf2 Rd1+ 35.Kg2 Bxf2 36.Kxf2 Rxc1 37.Kg3 b6 38.Rd4 Rc2 39.Rd8+ Kh7 40.Rb8 Rxb2 41.Ra8 g5 42.Rxa4 h4+ 43.Kh3 Rf2 44.Rb4 Rxf3+ 45.Kg4 Rxa3 46.Rxb6 Ra2 47.Kxg5 Rxh2 48.Rb3 Rh1 49.Rc3 h3 50.Kg4 ½–½

=== Game 6: Steinitz–Lasker, ½–½ ===
In this game, Lasker played 8...Bb6 instead of his previously favoured Be7. He was in a commanding position by move 14, and weakened White's queenside a move later with 15...Bxf3, forgoing Bc8. The game was adjourned with Lasker sealing 21...Nd6. This is superior to Nd2, which appears to threaten a fork, and win a knight by pin tactic, but after 22.Bxd2 Rxe2 23.Be3, the rook becomes boxed in, forcing Black to play Bxd4, meaning he gains nothing from this exchange. Lasker deliberated for over half an hour over this move, choosing to go up the exchange. Both players came under time pressure around the fortieth move, and White was slightly advantaged after move 45. After the queens were traded on move 58, the players entered a theoretical drawn position, despite Steinitz being up a pawn, and they came to a draw after playing to the 71st move.

Giuoco Piano (ECO C50)
1.e4 e5 2.Nf3 Nc6 3.Bc4 Bc5 4.c3 Nf6 5.d4 exd4 6.e5 d5 7.Bb5 Ne4 8.cxd4 Bb6 9.Nc3 0-0 10.Be3 f5 11.exf6 Nxf6 12.Rc1 Qd6 13.0-0 Bg4 14.Be2 Rae8 15.h3 Bxf3 16.Bxf3 Ne7 17.Ne2 Ng6 18.g3 c6 19.Bg2 Ne4 20.Qb3 Qf6 21.a4 Nd6 22.Qb4 Nc4 23.Rxc4 dxc4 24.a5 Bd8 25.Qxb7 Bxa5 26.Qxa7 Bd2 27.Qc5 Bxe3 28.fxe3 Qe6 29.Rxf8+ Rxf8 30.e4 Qf7 31.Kh2 Rb8 32.Qxc6 Ne7 33.Qc7 Rxb2 34.Nf4 g5 35.Nd5 Nxd5 36.Qd8+ Kg7 37.Qxg5+ Kh8 38.exd5 Re2 39.Qd8+ Re8 40.Qg5 Qg7 41.Qd2 Qf6 42.Qc3 Rc8 43.Bf3 Rb8 44.Bg2 Rc8 45.h4 Qd6 46.Bh3 Rc7 47.Be6 Qf8 48.Kg2 Qf6 49.Qa5 Re7 50.Qc5 Re8 51.Qxc4 Rf8 52.Qe2 Qxd4 53.d6 Rd8 54.d7 Rxd7 55.Bxd7 Qxd7 56.Qe5+ Kg8 57.h5 Qg7 58.Qe8+ Qf8 59.Qxf8+ Kxf8 60.Kf3 Kf7 61.Kg4 Kg7 62.Kg5 Kf7 63.Kh6 Kg8 64.Kg5 Kf7 65.Kf4 Kg7 66.Kf5 Kf7 67.g4 h6 68.Ke5 Ke7 69.Kd5 Kf6 70.Ke4 Ke6 71.Kd4 Kf6 ½–½

=== Game 7: Lasker–Steinitz, 1–0 ===
Ruy Lopez, Steinitz Defence (ECO 62)
1.e4 e5 2.Nf3 Nc6 3.Bb5 d6 4.d4 Bd7 5.Nc3 Nge7 6.Be3 Ng6 7.Qd2 Be7 8.0-0-0 a6 9.Be2 exd4 10.Nxd4 Nxd4 11.Qxd4 Bf6 12.Qd2 Bc6 13.Nd5 0-0 14.g4 Re8 15.g5 Bxd5 16.Qxd5 Re5 17.Qd2 Bxg5 18.f4 Rxe4 19.fxg5 Qe7 20.Rdf1 Rxe3 21.Bc4 Nh8 22.h4 c6 23.g6 d5 24.gxh7+ Kxh7 25.Bd3+ Kg8 26.h5 Re8 27.h6 g6 28.h7+ Kg7 29.Kb1 Qe5 30.a3 c5 31.Qf2 c4 32.Qh4 f6 33.Bf5 Kf7 34.Rhg1 gxf5 35.Qh5+ Ke7 36.Rg8 Kd6 37.Rxf5 Qe6 38.Rxe8 Qxe8 39.Rxf6+ Kc5 40.Qh6 Re7 41.Qh2 Qd7 42.Qg1+ d4 43.Qg5+ Qd5 44.Rf5 Qxf5 45.Qxf5+ Kd6 46.Qf6+ 1–0

=== Game 8: Steinitz–Lasker, 0–1 ===
French Defence (ECO C10)
1.e4 e6 2.d4 d5 3.Nc3 dxe4 4.Nxe4 Nd7 5.Nf3 Ngf6 6.Ng3 c5 7.Be2 cxd4 8.Nxd4 Bc5 9.Nb3 Be7 10.0-0 0-0 11.Bd2 Qc7 12.c4 Ne5 13.Qc2 Ng6 14.Rfe1 Bd7 15.Rac1 Rfc8 16.Bf1 Ba4 17.Bc3 Ng4 18.Qe2 Nf6 19.Nd4 Bd7 20.b4 Rd8 21.Qb2 Rac8 22.Nb3 Qf4 23.Bd2 Qb8 24.b5 b6 25.Bc3 Ne8 26.Nh5 f6 27.a4 e5 28.a5 Bg4 29.Ng3 Be6 30.Nd2 Nf4 31.Qb1 Bf7 32.Nf5 Bf8 33.Bb4 Nd6 34.Nxd6 Bxd6 35.Ne4 Bxb4 36.Qxb4 Rd4 37.axb6 axb6 38.g3 Nd3 39.Bxd3 Rxd3 40.c5 Rd4 41.Qb1 bxc5 42.Nxc5 Rc4 43.Nd7 Qb7 44.Rcd1 Be6 45.Nxe5 fxe5 46.Rxe5 Bh3 47.Red5 Rc1 48.Qd3 h6 49.g4 Bxg4 50.f3 Rxd1+ 51.Qxd1 Be6 52.Rd6 Qe7 53.b6 Rc1 54.Qxc1 Qxd6 55.Qe3 Bd5 56.Kg2 Qg6+ 57.Kf2 Qc2+ 58.Kg3 Qg6+ 59.Kf2 Qc2+ 60.Kg3 Qg6+ 61.Kf2 Bb7 62.Qb3+ Qf7 63.Qd3 Qd5 64.Qe3 Qd6 65.Kg2 Kf7 66.h4 Qe6 67.Qf4+ Kg6 68.Qg3+ Kh7 69.Qf2 Qg4+ 70.Kh2 Qxf3 71.Qc2+ Qe4 72.Qf2 Qf3 73.Qc2+ Be4 74.Qd2 Qf6 75.Qe3 Qxh4+ 76.Kg1 Qg5+ 0–1

=== Game 9: Lasker–Steinitz, 1–0 ===
Ruy Lopez, Steinitz Defence (ECO 62)
1.e4 e5 2.Nf3 Nc6 3.Bb5 d6 4.Nc3 a6 5.Bc4 Be6 6.Bxe6 fxe6 7.d4 exd4 8.Nxd4 Nxd4 9.Qxd4 Ne7 10.Bg5 Nc6 11.Bxd8 Nxd4 12.0-0-0 Nb5 13.Nxb5 axb5 14.Bxc7 Rxa2 15.Bb6 Be7 16.c3 Kf7 17.Kc2 Rha8 18.Kb3 R2a4 19.f3 R8a6 20.Bd4 g6 21.Rd3 Ke8 22.Rhd1 e5 23.Be3 Kd7 24.Bc5 Ra1 25.R1d2 Ke6 26.Ba3 g5 27.Rd5 Rb6 28.Kb4 g4 29.Ka5 Ra6+ 30.Kxb5 h5 31.Rd1 Rxd1 32.Rxd1 gxf3 33.gxf3 Ra8 34.Kb6 Rg8 35.Kxb7 Rg2 36.h4 Rh2 37.Kc6 Bxh4 38.Rxd6+ Kf7 39.Kd5 Bf6 40.Rd7+ Kg6 41.Ke6 h4 42.Rd1 h3 43.Rg1+ Rg2 44.Rxg2+ hxg2 45.Bc5 Bd8 46.b4 Kg5 47.Kd7 Bf6 48.b5 Kf4 49.b6 1–0

=== Game 10: Steinitz–Lasker, 0–1 ===
Queen's Gambit Declined (ECO D35)
1.d4 d5 2.c4 e6 3.Nc3 Nf6 4.f3 c5 5.dxc5 Bxc5 6.cxd5 Nxd5 7.e4 Nxc3 8.Qxd8+ Kxd8 9.bxc3 Nc6 10.Nh3 Kc7 11.Nf4 Rd8 12.Nd3 Bd6 13.f4 b6 14.Nf2 Bc5 15.Be2 Bb7 16.Nd3 Bf8 17.f5 e5 18.Bg5 f6 19.Be3 Rac8 20.0-0-0 Kb8 21.Nf2 Nd4 22.Bxd4 exd4 23.Bd3 dxc3 24.g4 Ba3+ 25.Kc2 Bc6 26.Kb3 Bc5 27.Nh3 Be3 28.Bc2 Bd2 29.Nf2 Rd4 30.Ka3 Be8 31.Nd3 Rxe4 32.Nb4 Rd4 33.Bb3 a5 34.Nc2 b5 0–1

=== Game 11: Lasker–Steinitz, 1–0 ===
Queen's Gambit Declined (ECO D37)
1.d4 d5 2.c4 e6 3.Nc3 Nf6 4.Nf3 Be7 5.e3 0-0 6.Bd3 c5 7.dxc5 dxc4 8.Bxc4 Qxd1+ 9.Kxd1 Nc6 10.a3 Bxc5 11.b4 Bb6 12.Ke2 Bd7 13.Bb3 Rac8 14.Bb2 a5 15.b5 Ne7 16.Ne5 Be8 17.a4 Bc7 18.Nc4 Bd7 19.Rac1 Ned5 20.Nxd5 Nxd5 21.Ne5 Bxe5 22.Bxe5 f6 23.e4 fxe5 24.exd5 Kf7 25.Rhd1 Ke7 26.d6+ Kf6 27.Ke3 Rxc1 28.Rxc1 Rc8 29.Rxc8 Bxc8 30.Bc2 Kf7 31.Bxh7 g6 32.Ke4 Kf6 33.g4 g5 34.Kf3 Kf7 35.Be4 Ke8 36.h4 Kd7 37.h5 Ke8 38.Ke3 1–0

=== Game 12: Steinitz–Lasker, ½–½ ===
Queen's Gambit Declined, Orthodox Defence (ECO D60)
1.d4 d5 2.c4 e6 3.Nc3 Nf6 4.Bg5 Be7 5.Nf3 0-0 6.e3 Nbd7 7.c5 c6 8.Bd3 h6 9.Bh4 e5 10.dxe5 Ne4 11.Bxe4 Bxh4 12.Bc2 Nxc5 13.Qd4 Be7 14.0-0-0 a5 15.h4 b5 16.Ne2 b4 17.g4 b3 18.axb3 Rb8 19.Qc3 Bxg4 20.Nfd4 Qb6 21.f3 Bd7 22.Nf4 Qb4 23.Rdg1 Qxc3 24.bxc3 Rfc8 25.Nh5 g6 26.Nf4 Bf8 27.Nfe2 Bg7 28.h5 g5 29.f4 Ne4 30.Rg2 c5 31.Nf3 c4 32.bxc4 Rxc4 33.Nd2 Nxd2 34.Kxd2 f6 35.exf6 Bxf6 36.fxg5 Bxg5 37.Rb1 Rxb1 38.Bxb1 Kf8 39.Nd4 Ke7 40.Ba2 Rc5 41.Kd3 Kd6 42.Rb2 Bg4 43.Rb6+ Kc7 44.Ra6 Kb7 45.Rd6 Kc7 46.Ra6 Kb7 47.Rd6 Kc7 48.Ra6 Kb7 49.Rd6 Kc7 50.Ra6 Kb7 ½–½

=== Game 13: Lasker–Steinitz, 0–1 ===
Ruy Lopez, Exchange Variation (ECO 68)
1.e4 e5 2.Nf3 Nc6 3.Bb5 a6 4.Bxc6 dxc6 5.d4 exd4 6.Qxd4 Qxd4 7.Nxd4 c5 8.Ne2 Bd7 9.Nbc3 0-0-0 10.Bf4 Bc6 11.0-0 Nf6 12.f3 Be7 13.Ng3 g6 14.Rfe1 Nd7 15.Nd1 Nb6 16.Nf1 Rd7 17.Be3 Rhd8 18.b3 c4 19.Bxb6 cxb6 20.bxc4 Bb4 21.c3 Bc5+ 22.Kh1 Rd3 23.Rc1 a5 24.Nde3 f5 25.exf5 gxf5 26.h3 Rg8 27.Nd5 Bxd5 28.cxd5 Rxd5 29.Rcd1 Rxd1 30.Rxd1 f4 31.Kh2 Re8 32.a4 Kc7 33.h4 Kc6 34.c4 Bb4 35.Kh3 Re1 36.Rxe1 Bxe1 37.Kg4 Kc5 38.Kxf4 Kxc4 39.Ke4 Bxh4 40.g3 Bd8 41.Ne3+ Kb4 42.Kd3 Kxa4 43.Kc2 Kb4 44.f4 Kc5 45.f5 Kd6 46.g4 b5 47.Nd1 Ke5 48.Nc3 b4 49.Na4 Kd4 50.Nb2 b5 51.Kb3 Be7 52.g5 a4+ 53.Nxa4 bxa4+ 54.Kxa4 Ke5 55.Kb3 Kxf5 0–1

=== Game 14: Steinitz–Lasker, 1–0 ===
Queen's Gambit Declined, Semi-Slav Defence (ECO D46)
1.d4 d5 2.c4 e6 3.Nc3 c6 4.e3 Nf6 5.Nf3 Bd6 6.Bd3 Nbd7 7.0-0 0-0 8.e4 dxe4 9.Nxe4 Nxe4 10.Bxe4 h6 11.Bc2 f5 12.Re1 Nf6 13.Bd2 Bd7 14.Bc3 Qc7 15.Ne5 Be8 16.Qd3 g5 17.Qh3 Qg7 18.Rad1 g4 19.Qe3 Bh5 20.Nxc6 Bxh2+ 21.Kxh2 g3+ 22.Qxg3 Qxg3+ 23.fxg3 Bxd1 24.Bxd1 bxc6 25.Rxe6 Ne4 26.Rxc6 Nxc3 27.bxc3 Kg7 28.Ra6 Rf7 29.c5 Rd8 30.Kg1 Re7 31.Kf2 Rb8 32.Bb3 Rbe8 33.Bc4 Rb8 34.Bd3 h5 35.Kf3 Rb2 36.Bxf5 Rf7 37.Ke4 Re2+ 38.Kd3 Rxg2 39.Rg6+ Kf8 40.Be4 Rg1 41.d5 Rg7 42.Rxg7 Kxg7 43.c6 Kf6 44.c7 Rxg3+ 45.Kd4 Rg8 46.d6 1–0

=== Game 15: Lasker–Steinitz, 1–0 ===
Queen's Gambit Declined (ECO D37)
1.d4 d5 2.c4 e6 3.Nc3 Nf6 4.Nf3 Be7 5.e3 0-0 6.Bd3 c5 7.0-0 cxd4 8.exd4 dxc4 9.Bxc4 Nbd7 10.Bb3 Nb6 11.Bg5 Bd7 12.Qd3 Rc8 13.Ne5 Bc6 14.Nxc6 Rxc6 15.Rfd1 Nfd5 16.Bxe7 Nxe7 17.Bc2 Ng6 18.Qf3 Nd5 19.Be4 Nxc3 20.bxc3 Rb6 21.c4 f5 22.Bc2 Qf6 23.c5 Rc6 24.Rab1 Nh4 25.Qe3 Rc7 26.f4 Ng6 27.Bb3 Re7 28.a4 Rd8 29.a5 a6 30.Ba4 Qh4 31.g3 Qg4 32.Rd2 Nf8 33.Bd1 Qg6 34.d5 Rf7 35.d6 Qf6 36.Rdb2 g5 37.Rxb7 gxf4 38.Rxf7 Qxf7 39.gxf4 Qg7+ 40.Kh1 Ng6 41.Qxe6+ Kh8 42.Qe3 Rg8 43.Bf3 Nh4 44.Bd5 1–0

=== Game 16: Steinitz–Lasker, 0–1 ===
Queen's Gambit Declined, Orthodox Defence (ECO D60)
1.d4 d5 2.c4 e6 3.Nc3 Nf6 4.Bg5 Be7 5.Nf3 Nbd7 6.e3 0-0 7.c5 Ne4 8.Nxe4 dxe4 9.Bxe7 Qxe7 10.Nd2 Nf6 11.Nc4 b6 12.b4 Nd5 13.Qb1 f5 14.Ne5 a5 15.Nc6 Qg5 16.h4 Qf6 17.cxb6 f4 18.Qxe4 fxe3 19.f3 Bb7 20.b5 Bxc6 21.bxc6 cxb6 22.Bd3 Qh6 23.g3 Rac8 24.Rc1 Rc7 25.0-0 Rd8 26.f4 Qg6 27.Qxg6 hxg6 28.Bxg6 Ne7 29.Be4 Rxd4 30.Bf3 Nf5 31.Rfe1 Kf7 32.Rb1 Nxg3 33.Rxb6 Nf5 34.Rb7 Rxb7 35.cxb7 Rb4 36.Rc1 Nd4 37.Kg2 Rb2+ 38.Kg3 Rxb7 39.Bxb7 Ne2+ 40.Kf3 Nxc1 41.Kxe3 Nxa2 42.Kd4 Kf6 43.Kc5 Nc3 44.Kc4 Ne2 45.Kb5 Nxf4 46.Kxa5 Ng6 47.h5 Nf4 48.Bf3 Kf5 49.Kb4 e5 50.Kc3 e4 51.Bd1 e3 52.Bf3 Kg5 53.Kc2 Kh4 54.Kd1 Kg3 0–1

=== Game 17: Lasker–Steinitz, 0–1 ===
Gioco Piano (ECO C50)
1.e4 e5 2.Nf3 Nc6 3.Bc4 Bc5 4.d3 Nf6 5.Nc3 d6 6.Be3 Bb6 7.Qd2 Na5 8.Bb5+ c6 9.Ba4 Bxe3 10.fxe3 b5 11.Bb3 Qb6 12.0-0 Ng4 13.Rae1 f6 14.h3 Nh6 15.Ne2 Nxb3 16.axb3 0-0 17.Ng3 a5 18.d4 Nf7 19.Qf2 Ra7 20.Rd1 a4 21.b4 Qc7 22.Ne1 c5 23.Qd2 Be6 24.d5 Bd7 25.Ra1 cxb4 26.Qxb4 Rc8 27.Qd2 Qc4 28.Rf2 Ng5 29.Qd3 Rac7 30.h4 Nf7 31.Qxc4 Rxc4 32.Rd2 g6 33.Kf2 Nd8 34.b3 R4c7 35.Rdd1 Nb7 36.Rdb1 Kf7 37.Ke2 Ra8 38.Kd2 Na5 39.Kd3 h5 40.Ra2 Raa7 41.b4 Nc4 42.Nf3 Ra8 43.Nd2 Nb6 44.Rf1 Rac8 45.Nb1 Ke7 46.c3 Nc4 47.Raf2 Na3 48.Ne2 Nxb1 49.Rxb1 Bg4 50.Rc1 Rc4 51.Rc2 f5 0–1

=== Game 18: Steinitz–Lasker, ½–½ ===
Queen's Gambit Declined, Orthodox Defence, Bd3 line (ECO D67)
1.d4 d5 2.c4 e6 3.Nc3 Nf6 4.Bg5 Be7 5.Nf3 0-0 6.e3 Nbd7 7.Rc1 c6 8.Bd3 dxc4 9.Bxc4 Nd5 10.Bxe7 Qxe7 11.e4 Nf4 12.g3 Ng6 13.0-0 Rd8 14.Qe2 b5 15.Bb3 Bb7 16.Qe3 a6 17.Ne2 Rac8 18.Rfd1 Re8 19.Ne1 c5 20.dxc5 Nxc5 21.Bc2 Rc7 22.f3 Rec8 23.Bb1 Ne5 24.b3 f6 25.Rc2 f5 26.exf5 exf5 27.Qf2 g6 28.Nf4 Ncd7 29.Nd5 Qd6 30.Rcd2 Rc1 31.Ne3 Rxd1 32.Nxd1 Qe6 33.Kf1 Rc5 34.Qe3 Rd5 35.Rxd5 Qxd5 36.Nc3 Qc6 37.Kf2 Kg7 38.Ne2 Qd6 39.Nd4 Qf6 40.Ng2 Nc6 41.Ne6+ Kg8 42.Bc2 Qe5 43.Ngf4 Qxe3+ 44.Kxe3 Nb4 45.Bb1 Ne5 46.Nd4 Kf7 47.a3 Nd5+ 48.Nxd5 Bxd5 49.Bd3 Ke7 50.Be2 Kd6 51.f4 Nd7 52.g4 fxg4 53.Bxg4 Nb6 54.h4 Bb7 55.Be6 Nd5+ 56.Bxd5 Kxd5 57.Nf3 Bc8 58.Ng5 h5 59.Ne4 Bf5 60.Nc3+ Kc5 61.Ne4+ Kd5 ½–½

=== Game 19: Lasker–Steinitz, 1–0 ===
Lasker–Steinitz, game 19

Position: d8 black rook, e8 black knight, f8 black king, a7 black pawn, f7 black pawn, g7 black pawn, h7 black pawn, b6 black pawn, d6 black bishop, g6 black knight, b5 white knight, e5 black pawn, b4 white pawn, a3 white pawn, b3 white bishop, e3 white pawn, f3 white pawn, h3 white pawn, b2 white bishop, e2 white king, f2 white pawn, d1 white rook

Steinitz blundered with 26...Rd7?, the move that ultimately lost him the game and the World Championship title. 27.Bc2 (threatening Bxg6 and Bxe5, as well as Bf5 and Nxa7 if the rook moves) wins material.
Queen's Gambit Declined (ECO D37)
1.d4 d5 2.c4 e6 3.Nc3 Nf6 4.Nf3 Be7 5.e3 0-0 6.Bd3 c5 7.dxc5 dxc4 8.Bxc4 Qxd1+ 9.Kxd1 Nc6 10.a3 Bxc5 11.b4 Rd8+ 12.Ke2 Bf8 13.Bb2 Bd7 14.Rhd1 Rac8 15.Bb3 Ne7 16.Nd4 Ng6 17.Rd2 e5 18.Nf3 Bg4 19.Rxd8 Rxd8 20.h3 Bxf3+ 21.gxf3 Be7 22.Rc1 Kf8 23.Na4 b6 24.Nc3 Bd6 25.Rd1 Ne8 26.Nb5 Rd7 27.Bc2 Ke7 28.Bf5 a6 29.Bxd7 Kxd7 30.Nc3 f5 31.b5 axb5 32.Nxb5 Ke6 33.Bc3 Ne7 34.Nxd6 Nxd6 35.Bb4 Nd5 36.Rc1 Nf7 37.Bd2 Nd6 38.Kd3 Kd7 39.e4 Nf6 40.Be3 fxe4+ 41.fxe4 b5 42.f3 Nc4 43.Rc3 Ne8 44.Bc1 Ncd6 45.Rc5 Nc7 46.Rxe5 Ne6 47.Rh5 h6 48.Re5 g5 49.h4 gxh4 50.Rh5 Kc6 51.Rxh6 Nc5+ 52.Kc2 1–0
