= Riga Technical University Open =

Chess tournament held in Riga, Latvia

The Riga Technical University Open (also RTU Open) was an international "open" chess festival annually held in Riga, Latvia in August from 2011 to 2024. It was the largest classical chess tournament in the Baltic states.

== Abstract ==
The Riga Technical University Open has been held since 2011, with the exception of the year 2020 due to the COVID-19 pandemic, and subsequently the 10th jubilee edition followed in summer 2021. The festival is organized by Riga Technical University in cooperation with the Latvian Chess Federation and the Riga Chess Federation. The founder and tournament director is IO (International Organizer) Egons Lavendelis from Latvia, who, as a player, is also an FM. Chief Arbiter of the RTU Festival is IA (International Arbiter) Alberts Cimiņš. Chief Arbiter of Tournament A is IA Andra Cimiņa. The current venue where the festival is held is the Ķīpsala exhibition hall in Riga, the capital of Latvia.

Over the years, the RTU Open has attracted thousands of chess players from over 50 countries, becoming one of the biggest chess festivals in northern Europe and in Europe as a whole. Additional events include GM lectures, excursions, simuls, as well as Bughouse (tandem) and Dice Chess are offered, too.

On May 30, 2025, the Latvian Chess Federation announced on its website that we announce the cancellation of RTU Open 2025 due to insufficient funding. The announcement also emphasized that we will definitely continue our work so that the RTU Open, possibly with a different name and format, returns to the Latvian chess calendar next year.

== History ==
The first three international chess festivals (2011–2013) were held in the main building of the Riga Technical University. The first and second festival included two classical chess tournaments (A for masters and B for amateurs) and a last day blitz tournament. The third festival included three classical chess tournaments (A for masters and B-C for amateurs). The fourth international chess festival in 2014 was moved to the International Exhibition Centre Ķīpsala, where larger number of participants applied. The fourth international chess festival included five classical chess tournaments (A for masters and B–E for amateurs) and a first day blitz tournament. The fifth and sixth festival was held in Ķīpsala and included four classical chess tournaments (A for masters and B–D for amateurs) and a last day blitz tournament. Overall, more than 1,200 participants took part in the festivals from the years 2014 to 2016. The seventh festival in 2017 was held in Ķīpsala and included five classical chess tournaments (A for masters and B–E for amateurs) and a last day blitz tournament. The eighth festival in 2018 was held in Ķīpsala and included five classical chess tournaments (A for masters and B–E for amateurs) and two blitz tournaments. The ninth festival in 2019 was held in Ķīpsala and included six classical chess tournaments (A for masters, Y for young chess players and B–E for amateurs), a rapid chess tournament and two blitz tournaments. In 2020, the tournament did not take place due to a COVID-19 pandemic. The tenth festival in 2021 was held in Ķīpsala and included four classical chess tournaments (A for masters, B&Y for young chess players and amateurs, and C&D–E for amateurs), a rapid chess tournament (G) and two blitz tournaments (F and H). The eleventh festival in 2022 was held in Ķīpsala and included five classical chess tournaments (A for masters, B, C, D for amateurs and Y for young chess players), a rapid chess tournament (F) and two blitz tournaments (E and G). The twelfth festival in 2023 was held in Ķīpsala and included five classical chess tournaments (A for masters, B, C, D for amateurs and Y for young chess players), a rapid chess tournament (F), two blitz tournaments (E and G) and three qualifying tournaments for beginners (Q1, Q2 and Q3). The thirteenth festival in 2024 was held in Ķīpsala and included four classical chess tournaments (A for grandmasters, B, C, D for amateurs), rapid chess tournament ("Riga Open Rapid Chess Championship 2024"), two blitz tournaments ("Latvian Chess Federation & FIDE 100-Year Anniversary Blitz Tournament" and "Midnight Blitz").

== List of A tournament winners ==
Year	Winner	2nd place	3rd place	Best woman
2011	(Luxembourg) Alberto David	(United States) Jaan Ehlvest	(Latvia) Vladimir Sveshnikov	(Poland) Katarzyna Toma
2012	(Slovakia) Ján Markoš	(Brazil) Alexandr Fier	(Germany) Daniel Fridman	(Germany) Judith Fuchs
2013	(Poland) Bartosz Soćko	(Netherlands) Robin van Kampen	(Russia) Mikhail Antipov	(Slovakia) Zuzana Štočková
2014	(Armenia) Hrant Melkumyan	(Hungary) Richárd Rapport	(Venezuela) Eduardo Iturrizaga	(Serbia) Maria Manakova
2015	(Latvia) Alexei Shirov	(Armenia) Robert Hovhannisyan	(Kazakhstan) Rinat Jumabayev	(Poland) Monika Soćko
2016	(Ukraine) Martyn Kravtsiv	(Armenia) Hrant Melkumyan	(Latvia) Arturs Neikšāns	(India) Soumya Swaminathan
2017	(Ukraine) Vladimir Onischuk	(Ukraine) Sergey Pavlov	(Israel) Tamir Nabaty	(China) Lei Tingjie
2018	(Armenia) Robert Hovhannisyan	(Armenia) Manuel Petrosyan	(Russia) Alexandr Predke	(India) Nutakki Priyanka
2019	(Latvia) Igor Kovalenko	(Lithuania) Šarūnas Šulskis	(Armenia) Arman Mikaelyan	(Romania) Irina Bulmaga
2021	(Germany) Alexander Donchenko	(India) S. L. Narayanan	(Lithuania) Tomas Laurusas	(Estonia) Margareth Olde
2022	(Lithuania) Paulius Pultinevičius	(Latvia) Toms Kantāns	(Sweden) Erik Blomqvist	(Latvia) Laura Rogule
2023	(Norway) Elham Amar	(Sweden) Erik Blomqvist	(Moldova) Dragoș Cereș	(Estonia) Anastassia Sinitsina
2024	(Greece) Nikolas Theodorou	(Germany) Jakob Leon Pajeken	(Lithuania) Tomas Laurusas	(Netherlands) Eline Roebers
