= Evgeny Sveshnikov =

Russian chess grandmaster (1950–2021)

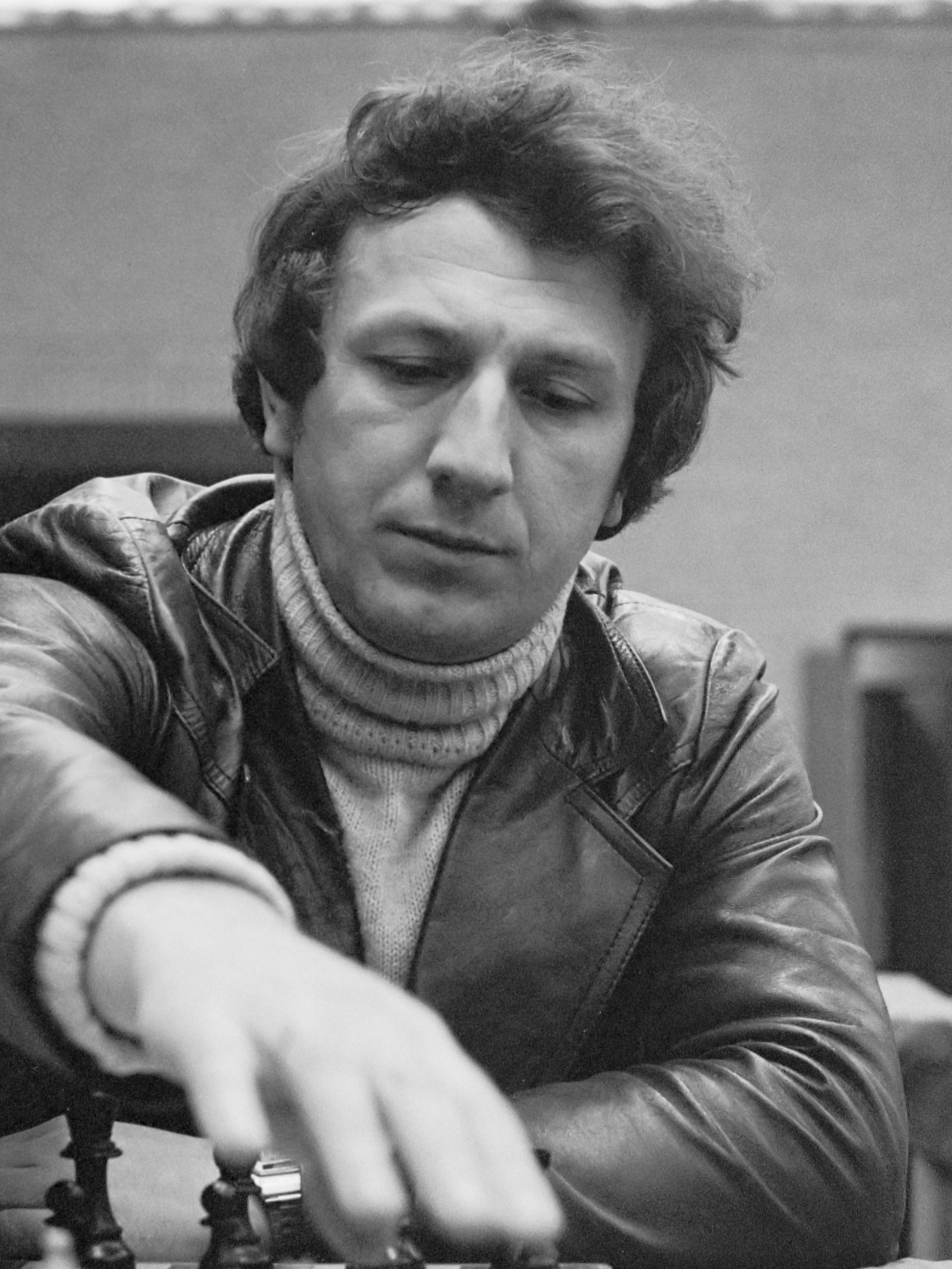
- Sveshnikov in 1981

Personal information
- Born: Evgeny Ellinovich Sveshnikov; 11 February 1950 Chelyabinsk, Russian SFSR, Soviet Union
- Died: 18 August 2021 (aged 71)

Chess career
- Country: Soviet Union (until 1992); Russia (1992–2002; from 2015); Latvia (2002–2015)
- Title: Grandmaster (1977)
- Peak rating: 2610 (January 1994)
- Peak ranking: No. 25 (January 1978)

Evgeny Ellinovich Sveshnikov (Russian: Евгений Эллинович Свешников; 11 February 1950 – 18 August 2021) was a Russian chess player and writer who is credited with the development of the Sveshnikov Variation of the Sicilian Defence. He was awarded the title of Grandmaster by FIDE in 1977.

== Chess career ==
Sveshnikov played in his first USSR Chess Championship when he was 17 years old. He was awarded by FIDE the titles International Master in 1975 and Grandmaster in 1977.

In his early international competitions, he was a joint winner at Děčín 1974, shared first place (with Lev Polugaevsky) at Sochi 1976 and won category 8 tournaments at Le Havre 1977 and Cienfuegos 1979. At Novi Sad in 1979, he shared second prize with Efim Geller behind Florin Gheorghiu. At Wijk aan Zee in 1981, he shared 3rd place and in 1983, was joint champion of Moscow. Sveshnikov won the Latvian Chess Championship in 2003 and 2010. In 2017, Sveshnikov won the 65+ section of the World Senior Chess Championship.

In team competitions, he played on the gold medal-winning Soviet team in the 1976 World Student Team Chess Championship, and was selected as a reserve for the Soviet side participating at the 1977 European Team Chess Championship in Moscow. Although only an international master at the time, he registered a score of 80%, winning individual and team gold medals. He represented Latvia at the Chess Olympiads of 2004, 2006, 2008, and 2010, and at the European Team Championship in 2011. In 2016 he was the top board of the gold medal-winning Russian team in the 65+ section of the World Senior Team Championship.

== Activism ==
Known as one of the most outspoken and controversial grandmasters on the circuit, Sveshnikov became linked with player revolts over the handing in of game scores. It was (and is) accepted practice that players submit copies of their game scores to tournament organisers and these games later appear on the internet, in books, magazines and in database programs. Sveshnikov insisted that it was not in the best interests of chess professionals to allow this to continue.

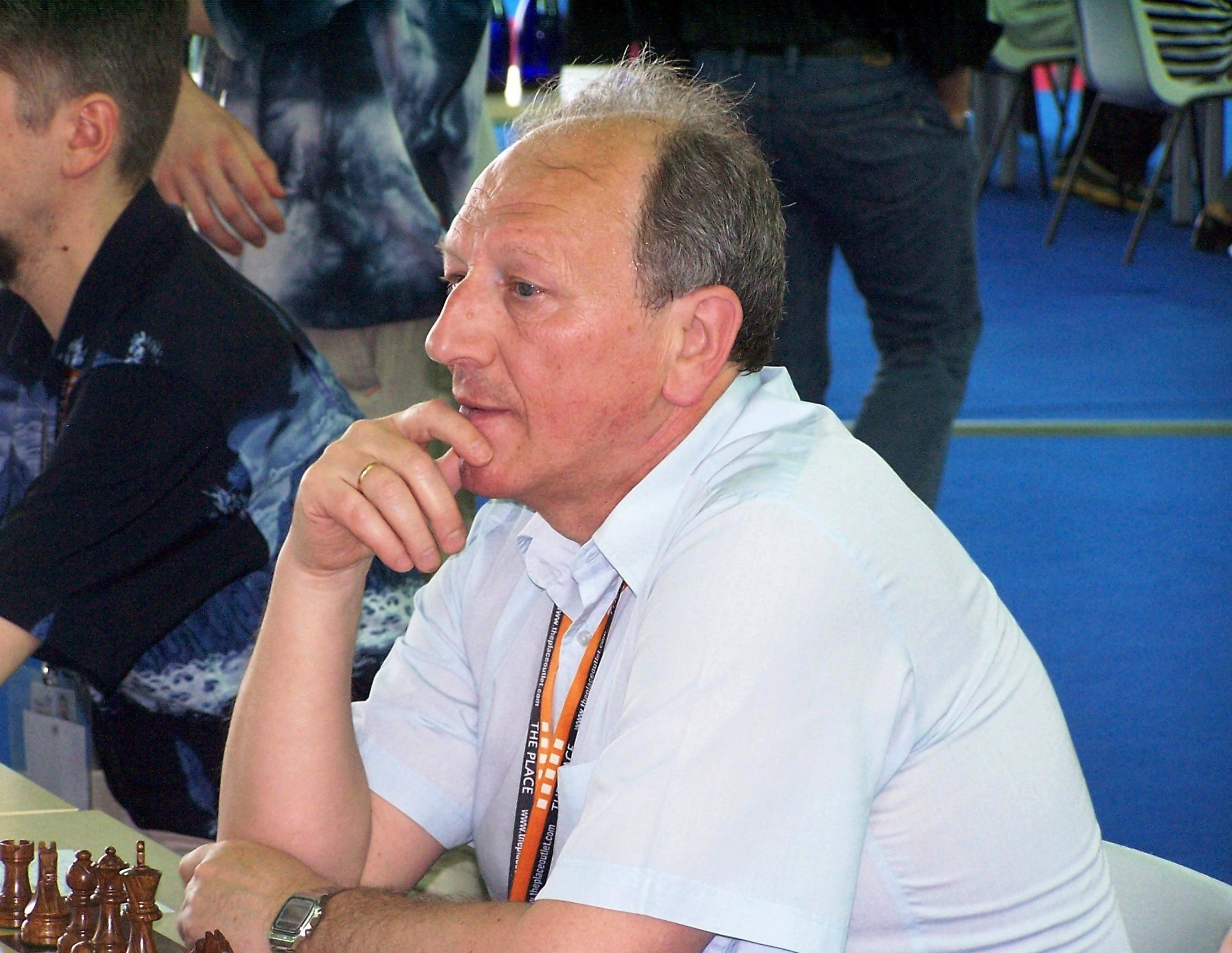
Sveshnikov at the Turin Olympiad in 2006

He contended that game scores were the labors and intellectual property of the two players concerned and therefore copyright permissions and royalty fees should apply. It is morally corrupt, he argued, that only authors, editors and owners of Chess Publishing Houses profit from the publication of game scores. Effectively, players are even prevented from producing an exclusive book of their own best games as an investment for their retirement. He also questioned the wisdom of handing over such detailed information to future opponents, who would utilise databases to improve their chances of victory, regardless of original thought or chess-playing ability.

== Opening theory ==
Sveshnikov is best known for the opening theory he pioneered during the 1960s and 1970s with his close friend Grandmaster Gennadij Timoscenko in the Sveshnikov Sicilian.

Position: a8 black rook, c8 black bishop, d8 black queen, e8 black king, f8 black bishop, h8 black rook, a7 black pawn, b7 black pawn, f7 black pawn, g7 black pawn, h7 black pawn, c6 black knight, d6 black pawn, f6 black knight, b5 white knight, e5 black pawn, e4 white pawn, c3 white knight, a2 white pawn, b2 white pawn, c2 white pawn, f2 white pawn, g2 white pawn, h2 white pawn, a1 white rook, c1 white bishop, d1 white queen, e1 white king, f1 white bishop, h1 white rook

The Sveshnikov Variation after 6...d6

Previously known as the Lasker–Pelikan variation of the Sicilian Defence, Sveshnikov's system was considered of dubious merit until he transformed it into an exciting and fully playable opening. The balance between winning and losing is often on a knife edge, making it an attractive proposition for black players seeking the full point. Mark Taimanov, in an interview, described it as chess opening theory's "last great discovery". That it is now regularly played by the world's leading grandmasters lends credence to this view. Vladimir Kramnik and Valery Salov are regarded as expert practitioners of the Sicilian Sveshnikov (categorised by the moves 1.e4 c5 2.Nf3 Nc6 3.d4 cxd4 4.Nxd4 Nf6 5.Nc3 e5 – the Sveshnikov 'proper' continuing 6.Ndb5 d6), but Kasparov, Shirov, Leko and Khalifman have also enjoyed success with it. Moreover, Magnus Carlsen employed this opening several times during the World Chess Championship 2018 match with Fabiano Caruana. The opening is rich in its tactical possibilities and despite being subjected to deep analysis, continues to flourish with new ideas being regularly unearthed. Sveshnikov authored a comprehensive book on this variation titled The Sicilian Pelikan.

He was also a pioneer in the development of the following lines:

- The Advance Variation of the French Defence.
- The Alapin Variation of the Sicilian Defence.
- 6.e5 in the Classical Variation of the Giuoco Piano.

== Personal life ==
Sveshnikov was born in Chelyabinsk on 11 February 1950.

He was married twice, and had two sons and two daughters. One of the sons, Vladimir Sveshnikov, is a chess player with the title of International Master.

He died on 18 August 2021, at the age of 71. His death came a few months after the death of his mother.

== Notable games ==
- Evgeny Sveshnikov vs. Ruslan Sherbakov, Moscow ch-URS 1991, Sicilian Rossolimo, 1–0. White expertly probes on the kingside to create weaknesses on the dark squares and then springs a surprise mating net, commencing with a queen sacrifice.
- Evgeny Sveshnikov vs. Igor Ivanov, Russia 1976, Caro–Kann, 1–0. White initiates early razor-sharp tactics and concludes the game with a stylish mating attack.
