= Giuoco Piano =

Position: a8 black rook, c8 black bishop, d8 black queen, e8 black king, g8 black knight, h8 black rook, a7 black pawn, b7 black pawn, c7 black pawn, d7 black pawn, f7 black pawn, g7 black pawn, h7 black pawn, c6 black knight, c5 black bishop, e5 black pawn, c4 white bishop, e4 white pawn, f3 white knight, a2 white pawn, b2 white pawn, c2 white pawn, d2 white pawn, f2 white pawn, g2 white pawn, h2 white pawn, a1 white rook, b1 white knight, c1 white bishop, d1 white queen, e1 white king, h1 white rook
- Moves: 1.e4 e5 2.Nf3 Nc6 3.Bc4 Bc5
- ECO: C50–C54
- Origin: 16th century
- Named after: Italian: 'Quiet Game' (Note: The term 'Giuoco Piano', meaning 'quiet game', was often applied to any opening that was not a gambit until the 19th century.)
- Parent: Italian Game

The Giuoco Piano (pronounced [ˈdʒwɔːko ˈpjaːno]; Italian for 'Quiet Game') is a chess opening beginning with the moves:

1. e4 e5
2. Nf3 Nc6
3. Bc4 Bc5

In King Pawn Openings by Dražen Marović and Idriz Sušić (1975) the authors write: "White aims to develop quickly – but so does Black. White can construct a pawn centre but in unfavourable conditions, a centre which cannot provide a basis for further active play."

The name "Italian Game" is also used; however, that name is now more commonly applied to all openings starting with 1.e4 e5 2.Nf3 Nc6 3.Bc4, including 3...Nf6 (the Two Knights Defense) and other replies.

== History ==
The Giuoco Piano is one of the oldest recorded openings. The Portuguese writer Pedro Damiano records games in it at the beginning of the 16th century. The Italian player Gioachino Greco is well known for developing the old main line 4.c3 Nf6 5.d4 exd4 6.cxd4 Bb4+ in the early 17th century; from there, he played the gambit continuation 7.Nc3 Nxe4 8.0-0, which is still occasionally seen today. Greco consistently replied to 3...Bc5 with 4.c3, which remains White's most common move, while other players at the time tended to play 4.0-0.

The Italian Game was popular through the beginning of the 20th century (the Møller Attack only originated in 1898), but refinements in defensive play led most chess masters towards openings like the Ruy Lopez (3.Bb5), which is frequently regarded as offering White greater chances for long-term initiative, though the emergence of the Berlin Defense (3.Bb5 Nf6) has raised doubts about this. Within the Italian Game, 3...Bc5 was historically more common than Black's main alternative 3...Nf6, the Two Knights Defense, but since the 20th century, they have been played comparably often.

Starting in the 1980s, the modern lines with c3 and d3 emerged as a new dominant variation that was especially popular among younger players. Anatoly Karpov used it against Viktor Korchnoi twice in the 1981 World Championship match, with both games ending in a draw. The modern c3+d3 lines have continued to see frequent high-level play.

Starting since the emergence of the term Italian Game in English in the late 20th century, a few authors have adopted differing definitions of Giuoco Piano, such as including all 3.Bc4 lines, including only lines with 4.c3, or including only lines with 4.c3 Nf6 5.d4.

== Analysis ==
White has multiple common plans in the Giuoco Piano. The classical plan is 4.c3 and 5.d4, aiming to achieve central domination while avoiding loss of tempo playing both d2–d3 and d3–d4. The Evans Gambit (4.b4) sacrifices a pawn in order to play 5.c3 with tempo for a lead in development: because the bishop must relocate, White is able to play 6.d4 before Black has played ...Nf6, unlike in the classical line. Despite being very forcing lines, Black has sufficient defensive resources. The modern plan involves playing 4.d3 or 5.d3, intending to play d4 only after adequate preparation.

=== Variations ===
Examined in this article are the following variations:

- 4.c3
  - 4...Nf6
    - 5.d4 exd4 (classical line)
      - 6.cxd4 Bb4+
        - 7.Bd2
        - 7.Nc3 Nxe4 8.0-0 (Greco's gambit line)
          - 8...Bxc3
            - 9.d5 (Møller Attack)
            - 9.bxc3 d5 10.Ba3 (Steinitz Variation)
          - 8...Nxc3 9.bxc3
            - 9...Bxc3?! (Greco's trap)
            - 9...d5
        - 7.Nbd2
        - 7.Kf1 (Kraków Variation)
      - 6.e5 (Sveshnikov's line)
      - 6.b4 (Dubov's line)
      - 6.0-0
    - 5.d3 or 4.d3 Nf6 5.c3 (modern line)
      - 5...0-0 6.0-0 d5
      - 5...d6
  - 4...d6 (Bourdonnais Variation and others)
  - 4...Qe7 (Close Variation)
- 4.d3 (Giuoco Pianissimo)
  - 4...Nf6 5.Nc3 (Four Knights Variation, by transposition)
  - 4...Nf6 5.c3 (modern line, by transposition)
- 4.b4 (Evans Gambit)
  - 4...Bxb4 5.c3 Ba5 6.d4 exd4
  - 4...Bxb4 5.c3 Ba5 6.d4 d6
- 4.0-0 Nf6 5.d4
  - 5...Bxd4
  - 5...exd4 6.e5 (Max Lange Attack)
- 4.d4
  - 4...exd4 (Scotch Gambit)
  - 4...Bxd4
- 4.Nc3 Nf6 (Four Knights Variation)
- 4.Bxf7+ (Jerome Gambit)

=== Transpositions ===
The Giuoco Piano may be reached by transposition from the Bishop's Opening (2.Bc4) via 2...Nc6 3.Nf3 Bc5 or 2...Bc5 3.Nf3 Nc6, though Black can avoid this, most often via 2...Nf6 3.d3 c6. Alternatively, 3...Nc6 4.Nf3 transposes to the Two Knights Defense; the continuation 4...Bc5 5.c3 reaches the modern main line of the Italian.

Another possible transposition is from the Scotch Gambit (3.d4 exd4 4.Bc4). After 4...Bc5 5.c3, 5...Nf6 is Black's most common move and transposes to the classical main line; 5...dxc3?! is weak due to 6.Bxf7 Kxf7 7.Qd5+ and then 8.Qxc5.

== Classical line: 4.c3 Nf6 5.d4 exd4 ==
Position: a8 black rook, c8 black bishop, d8 black queen, e8 black king, h8 black rook, a7 black pawn, b7 black pawn, c7 black pawn, d7 black pawn, f7 black pawn, g7 black pawn, h7 black pawn, c6 black knight, f6 black knight, c5 black bishop, e5 black pawn, c4 white bishop, d4 white pawn, e4 white pawn, c3 white pawn, f3 white knight, a2 white pawn, b2 white pawn, f2 white pawn, g2 white pawn, h2 white pawn, a1 white rook, b1 white knight, c1 white bishop, d1 white queen, e1 white king, h1 white rook

4.c3 Nf6 5.d4

4.c3 is the classical reply and supports the central advance 5.d4. The main reply is 4...Nf6, which was first analyzed by Greco in the 17th century. After 5.d4 exd4 6.cxd4 Bb4+ is the standard continuation (6...Bb6 is weak because of 7.e5). White can then play 7.Nc3, 7.Bd2, 7.Nbd2, or 7.Kf1!?, which avoids pinning a piece to the king at the cost of losing castling rights.

6.e5, advocated by Evgeny Sveshnikov, is the main alternative to 6.cxd4. Other possibilities include 6.b4, advocated by Daniil Dubov, and 6.0-0.

White may combine other fifth moves with 4.c3 instead of playing 5.d4. 5.d3 transposes to the Giuoco Pianissimo, a move which became more common than the traditional 5.d4 in the 20th century. 5.0-0 enters the Albin Gambit, which can be accepted with 5...Nxe4 or declined, usually with 5...d6.

In response to 4.c3, Black's main alternative to 4...Nf6 is 4...Qe7, intending to maintain the e5-pawn after 5.d4 Bb6 (the Closed Variation).

=== 6.cxd4 Bb4+ ===
After 6.cxd4, the bishop check on b4 is rather inconvenient for White. There are four ways to counter it.

==== 7.Bd2 ====
Position: a8 black rook, c8 black bishop, d8 black queen, e8 black king, h8 black rook, a7 black pawn, b7 black pawn, c7 black pawn, d7 black pawn, f7 black pawn, g7 black pawn, h7 black pawn, c6 black knight, f6 black knight, b4 black bishop, c4 white bishop, d4 white pawn, e4 white pawn, f3 white knight, a2 white pawn, b2 white pawn, d2 white bishop, f2 white pawn, g2 white pawn, h2 white pawn, a1 white rook, b1 white knight, d1 white queen, e1 white king, h1 white rook

5.d4 exd4 6.cxd4 Bb4+ 7.Bd2

7.Bd2 is White's most popular move. A possible continuation is 7...Bxd2+ 8.Nbxd2 d5 9.exd5 Nxd5 10.Qb3 Nce7 (10...Na5 is an alternative, inviting a repetition of moves after 11.Qa4+ Nc6 [threatening 12...Nb6] 12.Qb3 Na5) 11.0-0 0-0 12.Rfe1 c6. In this position White has more freedom, but the isolated d-pawn can be a weakness.

Another possible continuation, recommended by Kaufman, is 7...Nxe4 8.Bxb4 Nxb4 9.Bxf7+ Kxf7 10.Qb3+ d5!? (10...Kf8 11.Qxb4+ Qe7 12.Qxe7+ Kxe7 is safer, reaching an equal endgame) 11.Ne5+ Ke6! 12.Qxb4 c5!?, but this line is significantly less common.

==== 7.Nc3 ====
Position: a8 black rook, c8 black bishop, d8 black queen, e8 black king, h8 black rook, a7 black pawn, b7 black pawn, c7 black pawn, d7 black pawn, f7 black pawn, g7 black pawn, h7 black pawn, c6 black knight, f6 black knight, b4 black bishop, c4 white bishop, d4 white pawn, e4 white pawn, c3 white knight, f3 white knight, a2 white pawn, b2 white pawn, f2 white pawn, g2 white pawn, h2 white pawn, a1 white rook, c1 white bishop, d1 white queen, e1 white king, h1 white rook

5.d4 exd4 6.cxd4 Bb4+ 7.Nc3

7.Nc3 offers a pawn sacrifice. It usually continues 7...Nxe4 8.0-0. After this, Black usually plays 8...Bxc3. White can then play 9.d5, the Møller Attack, sacrificing a pawn for development and the initiative, or simply recapture with 9.bxc3, which was the most common move before the discovery of 9.d5, but is now a sideline (9.bxc3 d5 10.Ba3 Steinitz Variation).

8...Nxc3, which was played in Greco's games (as White) in this line, is a notable alternative for Black. Black sometimes also avoids the sharp complications of the Møller Attack after 7.Nc3 with 7...d5?! (which was played several times against Wilhelm Steinitz), 7...d6?!, 7...0-0 or 7...Bxc3, but these lead to passive positions for Black.

===== 8...Bxc3 9.d5 (Møller Attack) =====
Position: a8 black rook, c8 black bishop, d8 black queen, e8 black king, h8 black rook, a7 black pawn, b7 black pawn, c7 black pawn, d7 black pawn, f7 black pawn, g7 black pawn, h7 black pawn, c6 black knight, d5 white pawn, c4 white bishop, e4 black knight, c3 black bishop, f3 white knight, a2 white pawn, b2 white pawn, f2 white pawn, g2 white pawn, h2 white pawn, a1 white rook, c1 white bishop, d1 white queen, f1 white rook, g1 white king

Møller Attack: 7.Nc3 Nxe4 8.0-0 Bxc3 9.d5

Position: a8 black rook, c8 black bishop, d8 black queen, e8 black king, h8 black rook, a7 black pawn, b7 black pawn, c7 black pawn, e7 black knight, f7 black pawn, g7 black pawn, h7 black pawn, d6 black pawn, d5 white pawn, g5 white knight, c4 white bishop, e4 white rook, a2 white pawn, b2 white pawn, f2 white pawn, g2 white pawn, h2 white pawn, a1 white rook, d1 white queen, g1 white king

Main line: 9...Bf6 10.Re1 Ne7 11.Rxe4 d6 12.Bg5 Bxg5 13.Nxg5

After 8...Bxc3, 9.d5 is the most common move for White. The most common continuation is 9...Bf6 (followed by 9...Ne5), with the main line continuing 10.Re1 Ne7 11.Rxe4 d6 12.Bg5 Bxg5 13.Nxg5 h6!; 13...0-0 14.Nxh7! has been analyzed to a draw with best play, although Black has many opportunities to go wrong.

After 13...h6!, the most common continuation is 14.Qe2, where after 14...hxg5 15.Re1 Be6! 16.dxe6 (White also can try 16.Qd2 c6! 17.dxe6 f6 18.Bd3 d5 19.Rg4 Qc7 20.h3 0-0-0 21.b4, attacking) 16...f6 17.Re3 c6 18.Rh3 Rxh3 19.gxh3 g6 it is doubtful that White has sufficient compensation for the sacrificed pawn, according to Larry Kaufman; 14.Qh5 0-0 15.Rae1 Ng6! (or 15...Nf5!) also favors Black, as does 14.Bb5+ Bd7.

A recent try for White is 12.Rf4, with the idea of sacrificing the exchange on f6 for attacking chances, as seen in the game Jorden van Foreest–Levon Aronian, Chessable Masters 2021. It has the advantage that it has not been analyzed as deeply as the traditional 12.Bg5. Black has the option, however, of inviting a repetition with 12...Ng6 13.Re4+ Ne7, as occurred in Rauf Mamedov–Sergey Karjakin, Gashimov Memorial, Baku 2021. If instead Black plays 13...Be7, White has 14.h4! with good practical chances. The pawn thrust 12.g4 is another line occasionally seen for White.

Black has the ninth-move alternative of 9...Ne5, with the most common continuation being 10.bxc3 (10.Qe2 is also common) Nxc4 11.Qd4, followed by 11...0-0 12.Qxe4 (or 12.Qxc4) or 11...f5 12.Qxc4 d6. 11...Ncd6?! is inferior due to 12.Qxg7 Qf6 13.Qxf6 Nxf6 14.Rfe1+ Nfe4! (both 14...Kf8 and 14...Kd8 lose) 15.Nd2 f5 16.f3 and White has the better chances in the coming endgame.

===== 8...Nxc3 9.bxc3 =====
Position: a8 black rook, c8 black bishop, d8 black queen, e8 black king, h8 black rook, a7 black pawn, b7 black pawn, c7 black pawn, f7 black pawn, g7 black pawn, h7 black pawn, c6 black knight, d5 black pawn, b4 black bishop, c4 white bishop, d4 white pawn, c3 white pawn, f3 white knight, a2 white pawn, f2 white pawn, g2 white pawn, h2 white pawn, a1 white rook, c1 white bishop, d1 white queen, f1 white rook, g1 white king

7.Nc3 Nxe4 8.0-0 Nxc3 9.bxc3 d5!

Position: a8 black rook, c8 black bishop, d8 black queen, e8 black king, h8 black rook, a7 black pawn, b7 black pawn, c7 black pawn, d7 black pawn, f7 black pawn, g7 black pawn, h7 black pawn, c6 black knight, c4 white bishop, d4 white pawn, a3 white bishop, c3 black bishop, f3 white knight, a2 white pawn, f2 white pawn, g2 white pawn, h2 white pawn, a1 white rook, d1 white queen, f1 white rook, g1 white king

7.Nc3 Nxe4 8.0-0 Nxc3 9.bxc3 Bxc3?! 10.Ba3!

After 8...Nxc3, 9.bxc3 is White's usual reply. The line is playable but inferior to allowing the Møller Attack. If 9...Bxc3?! 10.Qb3 Bxa1?, White wins with 11.Bxf7+ Kf8 12.Bg5. Greco's game (probably analysis) continues 12...Ne7 13.Ne5 (13.Re1 and 13.Rxa1 also win) 13...d5 14.Qf3 Bf5 15.Be6 g6 16.Bh6+ Ke8 17.Bf7#. This trap is well known, and Black can avoid it by playing 10...d5. For this reason, the Scottish master James Aitken proposed 10.Ba3!, which gives White the advantage.

After 9.bxc3, best for Black is 9...d5! instead. A typical continuation is 10.cxb4 dxc4 11.Re1+ Ne7 12.Qa4+! Bd7 13.b5 0-0 14.Qxc4 Ng6!.

==== 7.Nbd2 ====
In recent decades 7.Nbd2 has emerged as a viable move for White, however 7...Nxe4, 7...d5 and 7...Bxd2+ are all sufficient for equality.

==== 7.Kf1 (Kraków Variation) ====
7.Kf1 was named the Kraków Variation after members of the Kraków Chess Club ran a theme tournament and published analysis of it in 1909. It has the obvious disadvantage of giving up castling rights, thereby impeding the entry of the king's rook into active play, but avoids self-pinning. It was occasionally seen in the 19th and early 20th centuries but is now largely abandoned. It most often continues with either 7...d5 8.exd5 Nxd5 9.Nc3 or 7...Nxe4 8.d5 Ne7 9.Qd4 Nf6 10.Bg5.

=== 6.e5 ===
Position: a8 black rook, c8 black bishop, d8 black queen, e8 black king, h8 black rook, a7 black pawn, b7 black pawn, c7 black pawn, f7 black pawn, g7 black pawn, h7 black pawn, b6 black bishop, c6 black knight, b5 white bishop, d5 black pawn, e5 white pawn, d4 white pawn, e4 black knight, f3 white knight, a2 white pawn, b2 white pawn, f2 white pawn, g2 white pawn, h2 white pawn, a1 white rook, b1 white knight, c1 white bishop, d1 white queen, e1 white king, h1 white rook

Main line: 6...d5 7.Bb5 Ne4 8.cxd4 Bb6

White can also try 6.e5, a line favored by Evgeny Sveshnikov which has seen a surge in popularity in the early 21st century.

Black's only good reply is 6...d5!, immediately striking back in the center. Alternatives are weak:

- If 6...Ng4, White may try the temporary sacrifice 7.Bxf7+ Kxf7 8.Ng5+, but the simpler 7.cxd4 is clearly better for White. Black's knight is badly placed and White dominates the center.
- If 6...Ne4, 7.Bd5! traps the knight and forces Black to choose between the weakening 7...f5 and the speculative sacrifice 7...Nxf2!? The latter line led to a famous win for Black in the game known as "Petrov's Immortal", Hoffmann–Petrov, Warsaw 1844: 8.Kxf2 dxc3+ 9.Kg3 cxb2 10.Bxb2 Ne7 11.Ng5? Nxd5 12.Nxf7 0-0!! 13.Nxd8 Bf2+ 14.Kh3 d6+ 15.e6 Nf4+ 16.Kg4 Nxe6 17.Nxe6 Bxe6+ 18.Kg5 Rf5+ 19.Kg4 h5+ 20.Kh3 Rf3#. Instead of the aggressive 11.Ng5?, White should consolidate with 11.Qc2 or 11.h3, with the better chances in each case.

After 6...d5 7.Bb5 Ne4 8.cxd4, 8...Bb6 is approximately equal. 8...Bb4+, the Anderssen Variation, typically continuing 9.Bd2 Nxd2 10.Nbxd2 0-0, is considered less accurate. After 8...Bb6, the main line continues 9.Nc3 0-0 10.Be3 Bg4 (10...f5 is also common) 11.h3 Bh5 12.Qc2, and from there 12...Bg6 13.Qb3 Ne7 14.0-0 c6 15.Bd3, 12...Nxc3 13.bxc3 f6 or 12...Ba5 13.0-0 Bxf3 14.gxf3. White has a space advantage; Black has a powerful knight.

=== 6.b4 ===
Position: a8 black rook, c8 black bishop, d8 black queen, e8 black king, h8 black rook, a7 black pawn, b7 black pawn, c7 black pawn, d7 black pawn, f7 black pawn, g7 black pawn, h7 black pawn, c6 black knight, f6 black knight, c5 black bishop, b4 white pawn, c4 white bishop, d4 black pawn, e4 white pawn, c3 white pawn, f3 white knight, a2 white pawn, f2 white pawn, g2 white pawn, h2 white pawn, a1 white rook, b1 white knight, c1 white bishop, d1 white queen, e1 white king, h1 white rook

Dubov Italian: 6.b4

6.b4 is a gambit line that has been advocated by Daniil Dubov. In the 21st century, it emerged as a frequent alternative to 6.e5 and 6.cxd4. The main line continues 6...Bb6 7.e5 d5 8.exf6 dxc4 9.Qe2+ Be6 10.b5. Black can offer the sacrifice 10...Nb4. Accepting the offer with 11.cxb4 allows Black a pair of connected passed pawns for the piece. The line was played in Alexandr Fier–Shakhriyar Mamedyarov, Chessable Masters 2023. Common alternatives to the main line include 10...Na5, 7...Ne4 and 6...Be7.

=== 6.0-0 ===
Position: a8 black rook, c8 black bishop, d8 black queen, e8 black king, h8 black rook, a7 black pawn, b7 black pawn, c7 black pawn, d7 black pawn, f7 black pawn, g7 black pawn, h7 black pawn, c6 black knight, c5 black bishop, c4 white bishop, d4 black pawn, e4 black knight, c3 white pawn, f3 white knight, a2 white pawn, b2 white pawn, f2 white pawn, g2 white pawn, h2 white pawn, a1 white rook, b1 white knight, c1 white bishop, d1 white queen, f1 white rook, g1 white king

6.0-0 Nxe4

6.0-0 is a rarely seen gambit line that was more popular during the era of Romantic chess. The pawn can be safely accepted with 6...Nxe4.

== Modern line: 4.c3 Nf6 5.d3 ==
Position: a8 black rook, c8 black bishop, d8 black queen, e8 black king, h8 black rook, a7 black pawn, b7 black pawn, c7 black pawn, d7 black pawn, f7 black pawn, g7 black pawn, h7 black pawn, c6 black knight, f6 black knight, c5 black bishop, e5 black pawn, c4 white bishop, e4 white pawn, c3 white pawn, d3 white pawn, f3 white knight, a2 white pawn, b2 white pawn, f2 white pawn, g2 white pawn, h2 white pawn, a1 white rook, b1 white knight, c1 white bishop, d1 white queen, e1 white king, h1 white rook

4.c3 Nf6 5.d3

4.c3 Nf6 5.d3, which became the main line in the late 20th century, can be reached by several move orders. 4.c3 and only then 5.d3 discourages Black from avoiding 4...Nf6, but 4.d3 Nf6 5.c3 is still common. A benefit of the line is that Black will often allow it to be reached by transposition from the Two Knights via 3...Nf6 4.d3 Bc5. The line also avoids the extensive theory of the classical lines with 5.d4.

The position can take some characteristics of the Ruy Lopez if the bishop retreats to c2 via b3. This idea has been taken up by some grandmasters, such as Anish Giri, to avoid the drawish Berlin Defense in the Ruy Lopez. White can also play b4 and a4, chasing the black bishop and staking out space on the queenside.

Before it became the main line, 4.c3 Nf6 5.d3 had already been a frequent sideline for centuries. The line appeared in games such as Mikhail Chigorin–Emanuel Lasker at the Saint Petersburg 1895–96 chess tournament. Despite its slow, drawish reputation, this variation became more popular after being taken up in the 1980s by John Nunn and Anatoly Karpov, who played it in the World Chess Championship 1981.

By the 1990s, reference materials had begun to focus more on lines with d3. For example, Gufeld and Stetsko's 1996 book treats d3 as being the primary approach and cover it first, giving d3 lines 80 pages but spending only 30 pages on classical lines. This has continued into the 21st century; Fundamental Chess Openings (2009) and Practical Chess Openings (2025) also cover d3 as White's primary approach. On the other hand, Harding and Botterill's 1977 book on the Italian Game predates the rise of d3 lines, so their coverage is much smaller. (Note: Harding and Botterill write: "This is the Giuoco Pianissimo (Very Quiet Game). Once it was fairly popular, and quite often Capablanca played it, but now it is considered innocuous.") The dramatic rise in popularity of 4.c3 Nf6 5.d3 during the late 20th century is an example of how opening fashion changes over time; the once-dominant classical main line and Evans Gambit are now sidelines.

In the 1990s and 21st century, the modern c3+d3 lines saw frequent high-level play. Garry Kasparov used it against Joël Lautier at Linares 1994, resigning after 29 moves; Vladimir Kramnik chose it against Teimour Radjabov at Linares (2004); Viswanathan Anand used it to defeat Jon Hammer in 2010; Magnus Carlsen used it against Hikaru Nakamura at London 2011, winning in 41 moves and Ian Nepomniachtchi used it against Magnus Carlsen in the 2021 World Championship match, losing in 49 moves.

== Alternatives to 4...Nf6 ==
=== 4...Bb6 ===
This tends to transpose to one of the two lines below via 5.d4 Qe7 or 5.d4 exd4 6.cxd4 d6.

=== 4...d6 ===
Position: a8 black rook, c8 black bishop, d8 black queen, e8 black king, g8 black knight, h8 black rook, a7 black pawn, b7 black pawn, c7 black pawn, f7 black pawn, g7 black pawn, h7 black pawn, b6 black bishop, c6 black knight, d6 black pawn, c4 white bishop, d4 white pawn, e4 white pawn, f3 white knight, a2 white pawn, b2 white pawn, f2 white pawn, g2 white pawn, h2 white pawn, a1 white rook, b1 white knight, c1 white bishop, d1 white queen, e1 white king, h1 white rook

Bourdonnais Variation: 4.c3 d6 5.d4 exd4 6.cxd4 Bb6

4...d6 most often continues 5.d4 exd4 6.cxd4 Bb6 (6...Bb4+ is playable but inferior), the Bourdonnais Variation, (Note: Named after Louis-Charles Mahé de La Bourdonnais) a line which can also be reached from the Scotch Gambit via 3.d4 exd4 4.Bc4 Bc5 5.c3 d6 6.cxd4 Bb6. In this line, Black yields the center to White but has reasonably developed pieces. Black can also play 5...Bb6, allowing 6.dxe5, which may continue with the sacrificial line 6...Bg5 7.exd6 Nf6.

=== 4...Qe7 ===
Position: a8 black rook, c8 black bishop, e8 black king, g8 black knight, h8 black rook, a7 black pawn, b7 black pawn, c7 black pawn, d7 black pawn, e7 black queen, f7 black pawn, g7 black pawn, h7 black pawn, c6 black knight, c5 black bishop, e5 black pawn, c4 white bishop, e4 white pawn, c3 white pawn, f3 white knight, a2 white pawn, b2 white pawn, d2 white pawn, f2 white pawn, g2 white pawn, h2 white pawn, a1 white rook, b1 white knight, c1 white bishop, d1 white queen, e1 white king, h1 white rook

Close Variation: 4.c3 Qe7

Black can try to hold a strongpoint in the center at e5 with 4...Qe7, a move which first appeared in the Göttingen manuscript c. 1500. After 5.d4 (5.0-0 usually transposes) Bb6, White's options include 6.0-0, 6.d5, 6.a4 and 6.Bg5. This approach has always been less popular than the 4...Nf6 lines described above. A typical continuation is 6.0-0 d6 7.a4 a6 8.h3 Nf6 9.Re1 0-0 (Leonhardt–Spielmann, Ostend 1907).

== Alternatives to 4.c3 ==
=== Giuoco Pianissimo: 4.d3 ===
Position: a8 black rook, c8 black bishop, d8 black queen, e8 black king, g8 black knight, h8 black rook, a7 black pawn, b7 black pawn, c7 black pawn, d7 black pawn, f7 black pawn, g7 black pawn, h7 black pawn, c6 black knight, c5 black bishop, e5 black pawn, c4 white bishop, e4 white pawn, d3 white pawn, f3 white knight, a2 white pawn, b2 white pawn, c2 white pawn, f2 white pawn, g2 white pawn, h2 white pawn, a1 white rook, b1 white knight, c1 white bishop, d1 white queen, e1 white king, h1 white rook

Giuoco Pianissimo: 4.d3

With 4.d3, White plays the Giuoco Pianissimo (Italian for 'Very Quiet Game', a name given by Adolf Anderssen). White aims for a slow buildup, deferring the push to d4 until it can be prepared. By avoiding an immediate confrontation in the center, White prevents the early release of tension through exchanges and enters a positional maneuvering game. Black usually responds with 4...Nf6 (or 4...d6 and then 5...Nf6). 5.c3 then leads to the modern lines with c3 and d3, while 5.Nc3 leads to the Four Knights Variation.

4...f5 is the not-so-quiet Lucchini Gambit; there can follow 5.Ng5 f4, the Dubois Variation.

=== Evans Gambit: 4.b4 ===
Position: a8 black rook, c8 black bishop, d8 black queen, e8 black king, g8 black knight, h8 black rook, a7 black pawn, b7 black pawn, c7 black pawn, d7 black pawn, f7 black pawn, g7 black pawn, h7 black pawn, c6 black knight, c5 black bishop, e5 black pawn, b4 white pawn, c4 white bishop, e4 white pawn, f3 white knight, a2 white pawn, c2 white pawn, d2 white pawn, f2 white pawn, g2 white pawn, h2 white pawn, a1 white rook, b1 white knight, c1 white bishop, d1 white queen, e1 white king, h1 white rook

Evans Gambit: 4.b4

In the Evans Gambit (4.b4), White sacrifices a pawn for quick development and attacking chances. The main line continues 4...Bxb4 5.c3 Ba5 (5...Be7 is a sound alternative) 6.d4, and now Black's main options are 6...d6 and 6...exd4. Perhaps the most famous game in the Evans Gambit is the Evergreen Game, a spectacular win by Adolf Anderssen against Jean Dufresne, probably played in Berlin in 1852.

=== 4.Nc3 ===
Position: a8 black rook, c8 black bishop, d8 black queen, e8 black king, h8 black rook, a7 black pawn, b7 black pawn, c7 black pawn, d7 black pawn, f7 black pawn, g7 black pawn, h7 black pawn, c6 black knight, f6 black knight, c5 black bishop, e5 black pawn, c4 white bishop, e4 white pawn, c3 white knight, f3 white knight, a2 white pawn, b2 white pawn, c2 white pawn, d2 white pawn, f2 white pawn, g2 white pawn, h2 white pawn, a1 white rook, c1 white bishop, d1 white queen, e1 white king, h1 white rook

Four Knights Variation: 4.Nc3 Nf6

4.Nc3 is typically met with 4...Nf6, known as the Four Knights Variation. White usually continues 5.d3. The line is also frequently reached via 4.d3 Nf6 5.Nc3 and from the Two Knights Defense via 3...Nf6 4.d3 Bc5 5.Nc3. Although the line can be thought of as transposing to the Four Knights Game (3.Nc3 Nf6), it sidesteps the well-known "fork trick" available in the Four Knights Game move order, where 4.Bc4 can be met with 4...Nxe4, intending 5.Nxe4 d5 forking the knight and bishop. The alternative 5.Bxf7+ Kxf7 6.Nxe4 d5 is worse, as it hands over central control entirely to Black without troubling Black's king.

An alternative to 4...Nf6 is 4...d6, which may continue with 5.Na4, or 5.d3, often transposing to the Four Knights Variation, though Black may avoid this by not playing ...Nf6.

=== 4.0-0 ===
4.0-0 can lead to the Max Lange Attack after 4...Nf6 5.d4 exd4 6.e5, but Black can avoid this with 5...Bxd4. Alternatively White can simply transpose into a Giuoco Pianissimo with 5.d3.

=== 4.d4 ===
4.d4, called the "Italian Gambit" in a 2003 book by George S. Lavin and Jude Acers, may transpose into the Scotch Gambit if Black replies 4...exd4. 4...Bxd4!, however, is considered the best reply by Unzicker. Therefore if White wants to play a Scotch Gambit, 3.d4 is considered more accurate.

=== 4.Bxf7+ ===
This unsound sacrificial line was a brief fad in the 19th century and is generally used only in casual games.

== ECO codes ==
Codes from the Encyclopaedia of Chess Openings are:

- C50 Giuoco Piano, lines other than 4.c3 and 4.b4, shared with Black's third moves other than 3...Nf6 and 3...Bc5 in the Italian Game
- C51 Evans Gambit, without 4...Bxb4 5.c3 Ba5
- C52 Evans Gambit, with 4...Bxb4 5.c3 Ba5
- C53 Giuoco Piano, 4.c3, without 4...Nf6
- C54 Giuoco Piano, 4.c3 Nf6
  - includes other than 5.d4 and 5.d3
  - 5.d4 exd4, without 6.cxd4
  - 5.d4 exd4 6.cxd4
  - 5.d3
