= Jakob Leon Pajeken =

German chess player

Personal information
- Born: 12 December 2003 (age 22) Hamburg, Germany

Chess career
- Country: Germany
- Title: International Master (2019)
- FIDE rating: 2475 (July 2026)
- Peak rating: 2465 (March 2023)

Jakob Leon Pajeken (born 12 December 2003) is a German chess International Master (2019). He is a Riga Technical University Open silver medalist (2024).

== Chess career ==
Jakob Leon Pajeken is son of German chess master Wolfgang Payeken (born 1970).

In December 2018, he won the international young masters tournament New Chess Brains in Hamburg. In November 2023 Jakob Leon Pajeken won German University Open in Berlin.

Jakob Leon Pajeken is participant of many international chess tournaments. In July 2022, Bamberg he won 2nd place in the international chess tournament. In August 2024, he finished second in the Riga Technical University Open "A" tournament.

In German Chess Bundesliga he represents Kiel chess club SK Doppelbauer Turm Kiel.

In 2019, he was awarded the FIDE International Master (IM) title.
