= Judith Fuchs =

German chess player (born 1990)

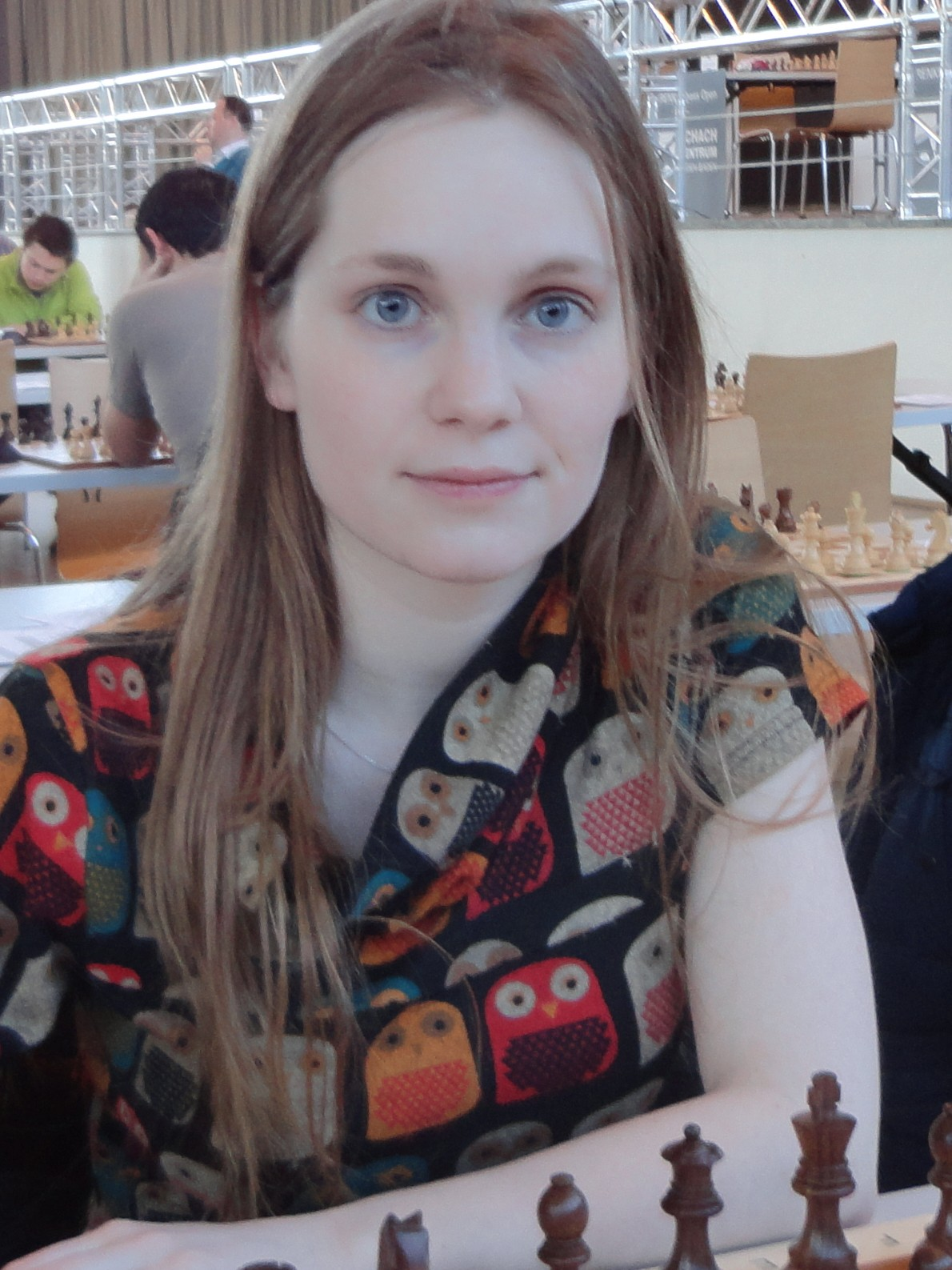
- Fuchs in 2016

Personal information
- Born: 23 January 1990 (age 36) Leipzig, Germany

Chess career
- Country: Germany
- Title: Woman Grandmaster (2017)
- Peak rating: 2348 (July 2016)

Judith Fuchs (born 23 January 1990) is a German chess player who holds the FIDE title of Woman Grandmaster.

== Chess career ==
Fuchs started playing chess at the age of five. From 1999 to 2007 she participated in German Girls' Championships. Fuchs won this tournament in 2000 (U10), 2006 (U16) and 2007 (U18). She participated in European Youth Chess Championships and World Youth Chess Championships. Fuchs has played for Germany in two Chess Olympiads (2008-2010). In 2012, she won Riga Technical University Open best women prize. In 2009 Fuchs was awarded the FIDE Woman International Master (WIM) title. In 2017, Fuchs achieved the FIDE Woman Grandmaster (WGM) title.
