= Flank opening =

Set of opening moves in chess

A flank opening is a chess opening played by White and typified by pawn moves and play on one or both flanks (the portion of the chessboard outside the central d- and e-files). White often plays in hypermodern style, attacking the center from the flanks with pieces rather than occupying it with pawns. Some of these openings are played often, although more often by advanced players than beginners, and 1.Nf3 and 1.c4 trail only 1.e4 and 1.d4 in popularity as opening moves.

== Classification ==
- 1.c4 – English Opening
- 1.Nf3 – Zukertort Opening– characteristically followed by fianchettoing one or both bishops, and without an early d4, can lead to the Réti Opening
- 1.f4 – Bird's Opening
- 1.b3 – Larsen's Opening
- 1.g3 – King's Fianchetto Opening, also known as Benko's Opening

In addition, some flank openings that are considered irregular:

- 1.a3 – Anderssen's Opening
- 1.a4 – Ware Opening
- 1.b4 – Sokolsky Opening, also known as the Polish Opening or the Orangutan Opening
- 1.c3 – Saragossa Opening
- 1.d3 – Mieses Opening
- 1.e3 – Van't Kruijs Opening
- 1.f3 – Barnes Opening, also known as Gedult's Opening
- 1.g4 – Grob's Attack
- 1.h3 – Clemenz Opening, or Basman's Attack
- 1.h4 – Desprez Opening, or Kadas Opening
- 1.Na3 – Durkin Opening, also known as Durkin's Attack or the Sodium Attack
- 1.Nc3 – Dunst Opening
- 1.Nh3 – Amar Opening, also known as Paris Opening

== Zukertort Opening (1.Nf3) ==
Position: a8 black rook, b8 black knight, c8 black bishop, d8 black queen, e8 black king, f8 black bishop, g8 black knight, h8 black rook, a7 black pawn, b7 black pawn, c7 black pawn, d7 black pawn, e7 black pawn, f7 black pawn, g7 black pawn, h7 black pawn, f3 white knight, a2 white pawn, b2 white pawn, c2 white pawn, d2 white pawn, e2 white pawn, f2 white pawn, g2 white pawn, h2 white pawn, a1 white rook, b1 white knight, c1 white bishop, d1 white queen, e1 white king, f1 white bishop, h1 white rook

Zukertort Opening

Position: e4 white pawn, d3 white pawn, f3 white knight, g3 white pawn, a2 white pawn, b2 white pawn, c2 white pawn, d2 white knight, f2 white pawn, g2 white bishop, h2 white pawn, a1 white rook, c1 white bishop, d1 white queen, f1 white rook, g1 white king

King's Indian Attack

If White opens with 1.Nf3, the Zukertort Opening, the game often becomes one of the d4 openings (closed games or semi-closed games) by a different move order (this is called transposition), but unique openings such as the Réti and King's Indian Attack are also common. The Réti itself is characterized by White playing 1.Nf3, fianchettoing one or both bishops, and not playing an early d4 (which would generally transpose into one of the 1.d4 openings).

The King's Indian Attack (KIA) is a system of development that White may use in reply to almost any Black opening moves. The characteristic KIA setup is 1.Nf3, 2.g3, 3.Bg2, 4.0-0, 5.d3, 6.Nbd2, and 7.e4, although these moves may be played in many different orders. In fact, the KIA is probably most often reached after 1.e4 when White uses it to respond to a Black attempt to play one of the semi-open games such as the Caro–Kann, French, or Sicilian, or even the open games which usually come after 1.e4 e5. Its greatest appeal may be that by adopting a set pattern of development, White can avoid the large amount of opening study required to prepare to meet the many different possible Black replies to 1.e4.

== English Opening (1.c4) ==
Position: a8 black rook, b8 black knight, c8 black bishop, d8 black queen, e8 black king, f8 black bishop, g8 black knight, h8 black rook, a7 black pawn, b7 black pawn, c7 black pawn, d7 black pawn, e7 black pawn, f7 black pawn, g7 black pawn, h7 black pawn, c4 white pawn, a2 white pawn, b2 white pawn, d2 white pawn, e2 white pawn, f2 white pawn, g2 white pawn, h2 white pawn, a1 white rook, b1 white knight, c1 white bishop, d1 white queen, e1 white king, f1 white bishop, g1 white knight, h1 white rook

English Opening

The English also frequently transposes into a d4 opening, but it can take on independent character as well including symmetrical variations (1.c4 c5) and the Sicilian Defense with colors reversed (1.c4 e5).

== Bird's Opening (1.f4) ==
Position: a8 black rook, b8 black knight, c8 black bishop, d8 black queen, e8 black king, f8 black bishop, g8 black knight, h8 black rook, a7 black pawn, b7 black pawn, c7 black pawn, d7 black pawn, e7 black pawn, f7 black pawn, g7 black pawn, h7 black pawn, f4 white pawn, a2 white pawn, b2 white pawn, c2 white pawn, d2 white pawn, e2 white pawn, g2 white pawn, h2 white pawn, a1 white rook, b1 white knight, c1 white bishop, d1 white queen, e1 white king, f1 white bishop, g1 white knight, h1 white rook

Bird's Opening

With Bird's Opening White tries to get a strong grip on the e5-square. The opening can resemble a Dutch Defense in reverse after 1.f4 d5, or Black may try to disrupt White by playing 1...e5!? (From's Gambit).

== Others ==
Larsen's Opening (1.b3) and the Polish Opening (1.b4) are occasionally seen in grandmaster play. Benko used 1.g3 (Benko Opening) to defeat both Fischer and Tal in the 1962 Candidates Tournament in Curaçao.

== See also ==
- Open Game (1.e4 e5)
- Semi-Open Game (1.e4 other)
- Closed Game (1.d4 d5)
- Semi-Closed Game (1.d4 other)
- Irregular chess opening
