= Semi-Closed Game =

Type of chess opening

Position: a8 black rook, b8 black knight, c8 black bishop, d8 black queen, e8 black king, f8 black bishop, g8 black knight, h8 black rook, a7 black pawn, b7 black pawn, c7 black pawn, d7 black pawn, e7 black pawn, f7 black pawn, g7 black pawn, h7 black pawn, d4 white pawn, a2 white pawn, b2 white pawn, c2 white pawn, e2 white pawn, f2 white pawn, g2 white pawn, h2 white pawn, a1 white rook, b1 white knight, c1 white bishop, d1 white queen, e1 white king, f1 white bishop, g1 white knight, h1 white rook
- Moves: 1.d4, Black does not reply 1...d5
- ECO: D00–D99
- Synonym: Half-Close Game

A Semi-Closed Game (or Semi-Closed Opening, or Half-Close Game) is a chess opening in which White plays 1.d4 but Black does not make the symmetrical reply 1...d5. The openings starting 1.d4 d5 are the Closed Games.

By far the most important category of the Semi-Closed Games is the Indian Defense, beginning 1.d4 Nf6. It leads to a variety of Indian openings, also known as Indian systems, such as the Nimzo-Indian Defense (2.c4 e6 3.Nc3 Bb4) and King's Indian Defense (2.c4 g6). It is also common to transpose to the Queen's Gambit (1.d4 d5 2.c4) or other lines that can begin with 1.d4 d5.

Many authors do not use the term Semi-Closed Game and instead do not distinguish them from the Closed Games.

== 1...Nf6 ==
Position: a8 black rook, b8 black knight, c8 black bishop, d8 black queen, e8 black king, f8 black bishop, h8 black rook, a7 black pawn, b7 black pawn, c7 black pawn, d7 black pawn, e7 black pawn, f7 black pawn, g7 black pawn, h7 black pawn, f6 black knight, d4 white pawn, a2 white pawn, b2 white pawn, c2 white pawn, e2 white pawn, f2 white pawn, g2 white pawn, h2 white pawn, a1 white rook, b1 white knight, c1 white bishop, d1 white queen, e1 white king, f1 white bishop, g1 white knight, h1 white rook

Indian Defense

The Indian systems are asymmetrical defenses to 1.d4 that employ hypermodern chess strategy. Fianchettos are common in many of these openings. As with the Closed Games, transpositions are important and many of the Indian systems can be reached by several different move orders. Although Indian systems were championed in the 1920s by players in the hypermodern school, they were not fully accepted until Soviet players showed in the late 1940s that these systems are sound for Black. Since then, Indian defenses have been the most popular Black replies to 1.d4; they offer an unbalanced game with chances for both sides. The usual White second move is 2.c4, grabbing a larger share of the center and allowing the move Nc3, threatening e2–e4 without blocking the c-pawn. Black's most popular replies are:

- 2...e6, freeing the king's bishop and leading into the Nimzo-Indian Defense, Queen's Indian Defense, Bogo-Indian Defense, Modern Benoni, or lines of the Queen's Gambit Declined,
- 2...g6, preparing a fianchetto of the king's bishop and entering the King's Indian Defense or Grünfeld Defense, and
- 2...c5, an immediate counterpunch in the center.

Advocated by Aron Nimzowitsch as early as 1913, the Nimzo-Indian Defense was the first of the Indian systems to gain full acceptance. It remains one of the most popular and well-respected defenses to 1.d4 and White often adopts move orders designed to avoid it. Black attacks the center with pieces and is prepared to trade a bishop for a knight to weaken White's queenside with doubled pawns.

The King's Indian Defense is aggressive, somewhat risky, and generally indicates that Black will not be satisfied with a draw. Although it was played occasionally as early as the late 19th century, the King's Indian was considered inferior until the 1940s, when it was taken up by David Bronstein, Isaac Boleslavsky, and Samuel Reshevsky. Despite being Bobby Fischer's favored defense to 1.d4, its popularity faded in the mid-1970s. Garry Kasparov's successes with the defense restored the King's Indian to prominence in the 1980s.

Ernst Grünfeld debuted the Grünfeld Defense in 1922. Distinguished by the move 3...d5, Grünfeld intended it as an improvement to the King's Indian, which features ...d6 instead. The Grünfeld has been adopted by World Champions Vasily Smyslov, Fischer, and Kasparov.

The Queen's Indian Defense is considered solid, safe, and perhaps somewhat drawish. Black often chooses the Queen's Indian when White avoids the Nimzo-Indian by playing 3.Nf3 instead of 3.Nc3. Black constructs a sound position that makes no positional concessions, although sometimes it is difficult for Black to obtain good winning chances. Anatoly Karpov was a leading expert in this opening.

The Modern Benoni is a risky attempt by Black to unbalance the position and gain active piece play at the cost of allowing White a pawn wedge at d5 and a central majority. Mikhail Tal popularized the defense in the 1960s by winning several brilliant games with it, and Fischer occasionally adopted it, with good results, including a win in his 1972 world championship match against Boris Spassky. Often Black adopts a slightly different move order, playing 2...e6 before 3...c5 in order to avoid the sharpest lines for White.

The Benko Gambit is often played by strong players, and is very popular at lower levels. Black plays to open lines on the queenside where White will be subject to considerable pressure. If White accepts the gambit, Black's compensation is positional rather than tactical, and their initiative can last even after many piece exchanges and well into the endgame. White often chooses instead either to decline the gambit pawn or return it.

The Catalan Opening is characterized by White forming a pawn center at d4 and c4 and fianchettoing their king's bishop. It resembles a combination of the Queen's Gambit and Réti Opening. Since the Catalan can be reached from many different move orders, (one Queen's Gambit Declined-like move sequence is 1.d4 d5 2.c4 e6 3.Nf3 Nf6 4.g3), it is sometimes called the Catalan System.

== Alternatives to 1...Nf6 ==
Position: a8 black rook, b8 black knight, c8 black bishop, d8 black queen, e8 black king, f8 black bishop, g8 black knight, h8 black rook, a7 black pawn, b7 black pawn, c7 black pawn, d7 black pawn, f7 black pawn, g7 black pawn, h7 black pawn, e6 black pawn, d4 white pawn, a2 white pawn, b2 white pawn, c2 white pawn, e2 white pawn, f2 white pawn, g2 white pawn, h2 white pawn, a1 white rook, b1 white knight, c1 white bishop, d1 white queen, e1 white king, f1 white bishop, g1 white knight, h1 white rook

Position after 1...e6

Position: a8 black rook, b8 black knight, c8 black bishop, d8 black queen, e8 black king, f8 black bishop, g8 black knight, h8 black rook, a7 black pawn, b7 black pawn, c7 black pawn, d7 black pawn, e7 black pawn, g7 black pawn, h7 black pawn, f5 black pawn, d4 white pawn, a2 white pawn, b2 white pawn, c2 white pawn, e2 white pawn, f2 white pawn, g2 white pawn, h2 white pawn, a1 white rook, b1 white knight, c1 white bishop, d1 white queen, e1 white king, f1 white bishop, g1 white knight, h1 white rook

Dutch Defense

The third most common response to 1.d4 (after 1...Nf6 and 1...d5) is 1...e6. 1...e6 rarely has independent significance, usually transposing to another opening, such as the French Defense after 2.e4 d5 or the Queen's Gambit Declined after 2.c4 d5. The Keres Defense (2.c4 Bb4+) is an independent line, but it often transposes as well, such as to the Bogo-Indian Defense after 3.Bd2 a5 4.Nf3 Nf6.

Another important response to 1.d4 is the Dutch Defense (1...f5). The Dutch, an aggressive defense adopted for a time by World Champions Alexander Alekhine and Mikhail Botvinnik, and played by both Botvinnik and challenger David Bronstein in their 1951 world championship match, is still played occasionally at the top level by Nigel Short and others. 1...e6 is sometimes used by players wishing to play the Dutch Defense (1.d4 f5) without allowing White the option of 2.e4!?, the Staunton Gambit.

The Benoni Defense (1...c5) is another possibility, but its lines are now more often reached via 1...Nf6 and later 2...c5 or 3...c5. 1...d6 is also reasonable, and might transpose to the King's Indian Defense (e.g. after 2.Nf3 g6 3.c4 Bg7 4.Nc3 d6), the Old Indian Defense (e.g. after 2.Nf3 Nbd7 3.c4 e5 4.Nc3 Be7), the Pirc Defense (e.g. 2.e4 Nf6 3.Nc3 g6), or the Philidor Defense (e.g. 2.e4 Nf6 3.Nc3 e5 4.Nf3 or 3...Nbd7 4.Nf3 e5). Other lines include 2.Nf3 Bg4 and 2.c4 e5.

The remaining Semi-Closed Games are uncommon. The Polish Defense (1...b5) has never been very popular but has been tried by Boris Spassky, Ljubomir Ljubojević, and István Csom, among others. The Bogoljubov–Mikenas Defense (1...Nc6) is an uncommon opening that frequently transposes to the Nimzowitsch Defense after 1.d4 Nc6 2.e4 or the Chigorin Defense after 2.c4 d5, although it can lead to unique lines, for example after 1.d4 Nc6 2.d5 or 2.c4 e5. The Englund Gambit is a rare and dubious sacrifice.

== List ==
- 1.d4 b5 (Polish Defense)
- 1.d4 c5 (Benoni Defense)
- 1.d4 Nc6 (Bogoljubov–Mikenas Defense)
- 1.d4 b6 (English Defense)
- 1.d4 d6 (Wade Defense when followed by 2.Nf3 Bg4, may also transpose to the Pirc Defense)
- 1.d4 e5 (Englund Gambit)
- 1.d4 e6 (Franco-Indian Defense)
- 1.d4 Nf6 (Indian Defense)
- 1.d4 f5 (Dutch Defense)

== See also ==
- Open Game (1.e4 e5)
- Semi-Open Game (1.e4 other)
- Closed Game (1.d4 d5)
- Flank opening (1.c4, 1.Nf3, 1.f4, and others)
- Irregular chess opening
