= Closed Game =

Position: a8 black rook, b8 black knight, c8 black bishop, d8 black queen, e8 black king, f8 black bishop, g8 black knight, h8 black rook, a7 black pawn, b7 black pawn, c7 black pawn, e7 black pawn, f7 black pawn, g7 black pawn, h7 black pawn, d5 black pawn, d4 white pawn, a2 white pawn, b2 white pawn, c2 white pawn, e2 white pawn, f2 white pawn, g2 white pawn, h2 white pawn, a1 white rook, b1 white knight, c1 white bishop, d1 white queen, e1 white king, f1 white bishop, g1 white knight, h1 white rook
- Moves: 1.d4 d5
- ECO: D00–D69
- Parent: Queen's Pawn Game
- Synonyms: Double Queen's Pawn Opening; Double Queen's Pawn Game; Close Opening

Closed Game (or Double Queen's Pawn Opening or Close Opening) is a generic term for a family of chess openings beginning with the moves:

1. d4 d5

Other responses to 1.d4 are termed Semi-Closed Games. The most frequent of the Closed Games is the Queen's Gambit, beginning 2.c4. Other examples include the London System and Colle System, which are classified as opening systems, where White avoids the pawn tension resulting from c2–c4. Such systems tend to be highly variable in move order and less forcing than 2.c4 and 1.e4, though Black can choose to introduce tension.

When written in lowercase, the term closed game refers to a chess position where ranks, files, and diagonals are closed, and tending to lead to more strategic gameplay, with less emphasis on tactics. This relates to the closed nature of the resulting positions where White declines to offer any pawn exchanges. The Closed Games lead to such positions more often than the Open Games (1.e4 e5) and Semi-Open Games (1.e4 without 1...e5), but this is not always the case.

1...d5 is Black's traditional response to 1.d4, and 1.d4 d5 achieved widespread popularity by the early 20th century as players with White began to try first moves other than 1.e4 more often. It remains the second most popular response to 1.d4. Although 1...Nf6 (the Indian Defense, a Semi-Closed Game) is now more common, it frequently ends up transposing to the Queen's Gambit or another Closed Game.

Many authors do not use the term Semi-Closed Game and instead do not distinguish them from the Closed Games.

== Analysis ==
The move 1.d4 establishes center control and permits the development of the queen's bishop. Black's symmetrical response 1...d5 does the same. Compared with the king's pawn openings, transpositions between variations are more common in queen's pawn openings. Play after 1.d4 also tends to be more positional compared to play after 1.e4, though there are many sharp tactical lines as well. These tendencies are related to the fact that after 1.e4, the e-pawn is undefended after the first move, while after 1.d4, the d-pawn remains protected by White's queen. This slight difference has a tremendous effect on the opening. For example, White often plays the solid move e3 at some point after 1.d4; playing e2–e4 in one move is more difficult to support after 1.d4 than playing d2–d4 in one move is after 1.e4 because the pawn on d4 is supported by White's queen, though eventually playing d3 after 1.e4 is not uncommon, particularly since the late 20th century, such as in the Modern Italian Game (1.e4 e5 2.Nf3 Nc6 3.Bc4 Bc5 4.c3 Nf6 5.d3, or other move orders).

The Queen's Gambit, 2.c4, is the main move, immediately introducing tension in the form of the threat of Black capturing with ...dxc4 or White doing so with ...cxd5, but another possibility for White is to play an opening system such as the London System, Colle System, or Stonewall Attack. White develops aiming for a particular formation without great concern over how Black chooses to defend. For example, the London System is characterized by the moves Bf4, Nf3, e3, c3, and Nd2, in any order. Because of the lower need for memorization of opening theory due to lower tension in the position, these systems are easy to learn and often seen in casual play, but are rarely used by professionals because Black is regarded as being able to equalize fairly easily, although Ding Liren used the London to defeat Ian Nepomniachtchi in the sixth game of the 2023 World Chess Championship. White may instead adopt a more flexible approach, however, rather than committing to the same initial moves.

== 2.c4 ==
Position: a8 black rook, b8 black knight, c8 black bishop, d8 black queen, e8 black king, f8 black bishop, g8 black knight, h8 black rook, a7 black pawn, b7 black pawn, c7 black pawn, e7 black pawn, f7 black pawn, g7 black pawn, h7 black pawn, d5 black pawn, c4 white pawn, d4 white pawn, a2 white pawn, b2 white pawn, e2 white pawn, f2 white pawn, g2 white pawn, h2 white pawn, a1 white rook, b1 white knight, c1 white bishop, d1 white queen, e1 white king, f1 white bishop, g1 white knight, h1 white rook

Position after 2.c4

The most frequent Closed Game is the Queen's Gambit, which is entered when White plays 2.c4, or later by transposition, often with 2.Nf3 and then 3.c4. While the King's Gambit (1.e4 e5 2.f4) is rarely played today at the highest levels of chess, the Queen's Gambit remains very popular at all levels of play.

Black can play 2...dxc4, the Queen's Gambit Accepted, giving up the center for free development and the chance to try to give White an isolated queen pawn with a subsequent ...c5 and ...cxd4. White will get active pieces and possibilities for the attack. More frequently, Black does not capture the c-pawn. 2...e6, the Queen's Gambit Declined, and 2...c6, the Slav Defense, are two popular ways for Black to decline the pawn. Both of these moves lead to an immense forest of variations that can require a great deal of opening study to play well. Among the many possibilities in the Queen's Gambit Declined are the Classical Defense, Lasker Defense, Tartakower Defense, Cambridge Springs Defense, Tarrasch Defense, Semi-Tarrasch Defense, and Semi-Slav Defense.

Replies to the Queen's Gambit other than 2...dxc4, 2...c6, and 2...e6 are uncommon:

- 2...Nc6, the Chigorin Defense, is playable but rare. It develops a piece but does not support the d-pawn and blocks Black from pushing the c-pawn, seen in many lines of the three common defenses.
- 2...c5, the Austrian Defense or Symmetrical Defense, is the most direct challenge to the gambit, but most opening theoreticians believe that Black cannot equalize with it.
- 2...Bf5, the Baltic Defense, develops Black's queen bishop early in order to avoid confining it behind a pawn after a later ...e6. Although it is not trusted by most elite players, some still occasionally play it.
- 2...e5, the Albin Countergambit, has dangerous pitfalls such as the famous Lasker Trap, but it is generally considered too risky for top-level tournament play.
- 2...Nf6, the Marshall Defense, is well met by 3.cxd5 and very rarely seen in grandmaster play.

== 2.Nf3 ==
Position: a8 black rook, b8 black knight, c8 black bishop, d8 black queen, e8 black king, f8 black bishop, g8 black knight, h8 black rook, a7 black pawn, b7 black pawn, c7 black pawn, e7 black pawn, f7 black pawn, g7 black pawn, h7 black pawn, d5 black pawn, d4 white pawn, f3 white knight, a2 white pawn, b2 white pawn, c2 white pawn, e2 white pawn, f2 white pawn, g2 white pawn, h2 white pawn, a1 white rook, b1 white knight, c1 white bishop, d1 white queen, e1 white king, f1 white bishop, h1 white rook

Position after 2.Nf3

2.Nf3, the second most common move, leads to a position also frequently reached via 1.Nf3 after 1...d5 2.d4. It is most often met with 2...Nf6, a flexible move, though Black has several other options that often transpose. 3.c4, transposing to the Queen's Gambit, is common. This has several consequences, including preventing White from reaching the main line of the Exchange Variation of the Queen's Gambit Declined and avoiding the Albin Countergambit.

White's alternative third moves include:

- 3.Bf4, the London System, where White plans e3, c3, Nbd2.
- 3.Bg5, the Torre Attack.
- 3.e3, the Colle System.
- 3.g3, which may transpose to the Catalan Opening.

Though 2...e6 and 2...c6 have little independent significance from 2...Nf6, Black can try to introduce tension with 2...c5. White often plays 3.c4 in reply, a position which can also be reached from the Austrian Defense (2...c5) and often transposes to a Tarrasch Defense (2.c4 e6 3.Nc3 c5). Alternatively, there are the quiet 3.e3 and 3.c3, as well as 3.dxc5, a reversed Queen's Gambit Accepted with White having played the extra move Nf3.

== White's second-move alternatives ==
Position: a8 black rook, b8 black knight, c8 black bishop, d8 black queen, e8 black king, f8 black bishop, h8 black rook, a7 black pawn, b7 black pawn, c7 black pawn, e7 black pawn, f7 black pawn, g7 black pawn, h7 black pawn, f6 black knight, d5 black pawn, g5 white bishop, d4 white pawn, c3 white knight, a2 white pawn, b2 white pawn, c2 white pawn, e2 white pawn, f2 white pawn, g2 white pawn, h2 white pawn, a1 white rook, d1 white queen, e1 white king, f1 white bishop, g1 white knight, h1 white rook

Veresov Attack: 2.Nc3 Nf6 3.Bg5

Position: a8 black rook, b8 black knight, c8 black bishop, d8 black queen, e8 black king, f8 black bishop, h8 black rook, a7 black pawn, b7 black pawn, c7 black pawn, e7 black pawn, f7 black pawn, g7 black pawn, h7 black pawn, f6 black knight, d5 black pawn, d4 white pawn, f4 white bishop, c3 white knight, a2 white pawn, b2 white pawn, c2 white pawn, e2 white pawn, f2 white pawn, g2 white pawn, h2 white pawn, a1 white rook, d1 white queen, e1 white king, f1 white bishop, g1 white knight, h1 white rook

Jobava London: 2.Nc3 Nf6 3.Bf4

Position: a8 black rook, b8 black knight, c8 black bishop, d8 black queen, e8 black king, f8 black bishop, g8 black knight, h8 black rook, a7 black pawn, b7 black pawn, c7 black pawn, e7 black pawn, f7 black pawn, g7 black pawn, h7 black pawn, d5 black pawn, d4 white pawn, f4 white bishop, a2 white pawn, b2 white pawn, c2 white pawn, e2 white pawn, f2 white pawn, g2 white pawn, h2 white pawn, a1 white rook, b1 white knight, d1 white queen, e1 white king, f1 white bishop, g1 white knight, h1 white rook

London System: 2.Bf4

Moves other than 2.c4 and 2.Nf3 include:

- 2.Nc3, where Black usually plays 2...Nf6 (2...c5 is a viable alternative). White can play a gambit with 3.e4, to which Black responds either with 3...Nxe4 (Hübsch Gambit) or 3...dxe4, transposing to the line 2.e4 dxe4 3.Nc3 Nf6. Other moves are 3.Bg5, leading to the Richter–Veresov Attack and 3.Bf4, which is the Jobava London System.
- 2.Bf4 is the London System.
- 2.Bg5 is the Hodgson Attack (also known as the Levitsky Attack or the Pseudo-Trompowsky Attack).
- 2.g3 is an early kingside fianchetto. It can transpose to the Catalan Opening if White follows up with c4.
- 2.e3 can lead to the Colle System if White follows up with Nf3, Bd3, c3, Nbd2, and 0-0, intending a central break with e3–e4. Another plan is the Stonewall Attack, in which White plays an early f2–f4 before Ng1–f3, intending to establish a knight on e5.
- 2.e4 dxe4 3.Nc3 (3.f3 e5!) Nf6 4.f3 is the Blackmar–Diemer Gambit, a speculative attacking line. Black may decline the gambit and transpose to the French Defense with 2...e6, to the Caro–Kann Defense with 2...c6, or to the Nimzowitsch Defense with 2...Nc6.

== See also ==
- Open Game (1.e4 e5)
- Semi-Open Game (1.e4 moves other than 1...e5)
- Semi-Closed Game (1.d4 moves other than 1...d5)
- Flank opening (1.c4, 1.Nf3, 1.f4, and others)
- Irregular chess opening
