= 1 E4 =

1 E4 may refer to:

- 10000 (number), the natural number following 9999 and preceding 10001
- In chess openings, the opening move 1.e4 (see King's Pawn Game)
