= Alapin =

Alapin may refer to:

- Semyon Alapin, chess master (1856–1923)
  - Sicilian Defence, Alapin Variation (1.e4 c5 2.c3)
  - Alapin-Diemer Gambit (1.e4 e6 2.d4 d5 3.Be3)
  - Alapin's Opening (1.e4 e5 2.Ne2)
