= Desprez Opening =

Despréz Opening
Position: a8 black rook, b8 black knight, c8 black bishop, d8 black queen, e8 black king, f8 black bishop, g8 black knight, h8 black rook, a7 black pawn, b7 black pawn, c7 black pawn, d7 black pawn, e7 black pawn, f7 black pawn, g7 black pawn, h7 black pawn, h4 white pawn, a2 white pawn, b2 white pawn, c2 white pawn, d2 white pawn, e2 white pawn, f2 white pawn, g2 white pawn, a1 white rook, b1 white knight, c1 white bishop, d1 white queen, e1 white king, f1 white bishop, g1 white knight, h1 white rook
- Moves: 1.h4
- ECO: A00
- Named after: Marcel Després
- Synonyms: Kádas Opening; Anti-Borg Opening; Samurai Opening; Harry's Opening; Reagan's Attack

The Despréz Opening, also called the Kádas Opening, is a chess opening characterized by the opening move:

1.h4

The opening is named after the French player Marcel Després. Like a number of other rare openings, 1.h4 has some alternate names such as Anti-Borg Opening, Samurai Opening, Harry's Opening and Reagan's Attack.

As the Despréz Opening is very rare, it is considered an irregular opening and is classified under the A00 code in the Encyclopaedia of Chess Openings.

== Assessment ==
Like 1.a4, the Ware Opening, 1.h4 does nothing in the fight for central space and does very little in the way of development. The only piece released is the rook, which is usually not developed to h3. In addition, 1.h4 weakens White's kingside. For these reasons, 1.h4 is among the rarest of the twenty possible first moves for White.

Black usually responds by grabbing the center with 1...d5 or 1...e5. A simple and sound development by 1...Nf6 is also possible. The response 1...g6, intending to fianchetto Black's bishop on g7, is rare, because White can undermine Black's pawn structure with 2.h5, making 1.h4 seem logical.

Grandmaster David Bronstein once remarked that he knew of a Russian player who always opened with 1.h4 and always won. His point was that after 1...e5 2.g3 d5 3.d4! exd4 4.Qxd4 Nc6 5.Qd1 Nf6 6.Nh3! Be7 7.Nf4 0-0 8.Bg2, the f4-knight is well placed, leaving White with a good position. Black does not have to be so cooperative, however.

Hikaru Nakamura has used the opening on many occasions, particularly in his 2024 games.

== Variations and gambits ==
- Kádas Gambit – 1.h4 c5 2.b4
- Kádas Gambit with 3.c3 – 1.h4 e5 2.d4 exd4 3.c3
- Koola-Koola Variation – 1.h4 a5
- Myers Variation – 1.h4 d5 2.d4 c5 3.e4
- Schneider Gambit – 1.h4 g5
- Steinbok Gambit – 1.h4 f5 2.e4 fxe4 3.d3
- Beginner's Mistake – 1.h4 d5 2.Rh3

== See also ==
- List of chess openings
- List of chess openings named after people
- "The Chess Opening 1.h4" by Edward Winter
