= Bird's Opening =

Position: a8 black rook, b8 black knight, c8 black bishop, d8 black queen, e8 black king, f8 black bishop, g8 black knight, h8 black rook, a7 black pawn, b7 black pawn, c7 black pawn, d7 black pawn, e7 black pawn, f7 black pawn, g7 black pawn, h7 black pawn, f4 white pawn, a2 white pawn, b2 white pawn, c2 white pawn, d2 white pawn, e2 white pawn, g2 white pawn, h2 white pawn, a1 white rook, b1 white knight, c1 white bishop, d1 white queen, e1 white king, f1 white bishop, g1 white knight, h1 white rook
- Moves: 1.f4
- ECO: A02–A03
- Named after: Henry Bird
- Synonyms: Bird Opening; Stein Opening; Dutch Attack; Reversed Dutch Defense

Bird's Opening (or the Bird Opening, Stein Opening, or the Dutch Attack) is a chess opening beginning with the move:

1. f4

Named after 19th-century English player Henry Bird, Bird's Opening is a standard flank opening. White's strategic ideas involve control of the e5-square, offering good attacking chances at the expense of slightly weakening their own kingside. Black's most common response is 1...d5, but Black may also challenge White's plan to control e5 immediately by playing the risky From Gambit (1...e5).

The Encyclopaedia of Chess Openings assigns two codes for Bird's Opening: A02 (1.f4) and A03 (1.f4 d5).

== History ==
The opening was mentioned by Luis Ramírez de Lucena in his book Repetición de Amores y Arte de Ajedrez con Cien Juegos de Partido, published c. 1497. In the mid-nineteenth century the opening was sometimes played by La Bourdonnais and Elijah Williams, among others. The British master Henry Edward Bird first played it in 1855 and continued to do so for the next 40 years. After a six-year break from chess, he forgot how to play the more familiar openings. In 1885, the Hereford Times named it after him. In the first half of the 20th century Aron Nimzowitsch and Savielly Tartakower sometimes played 1.f4. In more recent decades, grandmasters who have used the Bird's with any regularity include Bent Larsen, Andrew Soltis, Lars Karlsson, Mikhail Gurevich, and Henrik Danielsen.

== 1...d5 ==
Position: a8 black rook, b8 black knight, c8 black bishop, d8 black queen, e8 black king, f8 black bishop, g8 black knight, h8 black rook, a7 black pawn, b7 black pawn, c7 black pawn, e7 black pawn, f7 black pawn, g7 black pawn, h7 black pawn, d5 black pawn, f4 white pawn, a2 white pawn, b2 white pawn, c2 white pawn, d2 white pawn, e2 white pawn, g2 white pawn, h2 white pawn, a1 white rook, b1 white knight, c1 white bishop, d1 white queen, e1 white king, f1 white bishop, g1 white knight, h1 white rook

After 1.f4 d5

Black's most common response is 1...d5, when the game can take on the character of a Dutch Defence (1.d4 f5) with colours reversed. White will then often either fianchetto their king's bishop with Nf3, g3, Bg2, and 0-0 with a reversed Leningrad Dutch; adopt a Stonewall formation with pawns on d4, e3, and f4 and attempt a kingside attack; or fianchetto their queen's bishop to increase their hold on the e5-square. Another strategy, by analogy with the Ilyin–Zhenevsky Variation of the Dutch Defence, involves White playing Nf3, e3, Be2, 0-0, d3 and attempting to achieve the break e3–e4 by various means, e.g. Ne5, Bf3, Qe2, and finally e3–e4, or simply Nc3 followed by e4. Timothy Taylor's book on Bird's Opening suggests as a main line: 1.f4 d5 2.Nf3 g6 3.e3 Bg7 4.Be2 Nf6 5.0-0 0-0 6.d3 c5.

White can also play 2.c4, the Mujannah–Sturm Gambit. This is a decent opening and seems to borrow ideas from the Réti Opening (1.Nf3 d5 2.c4) and the Queen's Gambit Accepted. Eventually, this move order is followed by Nf3. The best move in this position is 2...d4, where the game continues in the style of the Réti Opening, with 3.Nf3 being a possible next move. 2.c4 is not a true gambit, since if Black tries to hold on to their pawn, they will be punished (2.c4 dxc4 3.e3 b5? [Black should pursue development instead] 4.a4 c6? 5.axb5 cxb5 6.Qf3, where Black must part with a minor piece, akin to the Queen's Gambit Accepted trap).

== From's Gambit: 1...e5 ==
Position: a8 black rook, b8 black knight, c8 black bishop, d8 black queen, e8 black king, f8 black bishop, g8 black knight, h8 black rook, a7 black pawn, b7 black pawn, c7 black pawn, d7 black pawn, f7 black pawn, g7 black pawn, h7 black pawn, e5 black pawn, f4 white pawn, a2 white pawn, b2 white pawn, c2 white pawn, d2 white pawn, e2 white pawn, g2 white pawn, h2 white pawn, a1 white rook, b1 white knight, c1 white bishop, d1 white queen, e1 white king, f1 white bishop, g1 white knight, h1 white rook

From's Gambit: 1.f4 e5

Black's sharpest reply is 1...e5!?, From's Gambit, named for the Danish chess player Martin Severin From (1828–1895). White then has the option to transpose into the King's Gambit with 2.e4. This is an important option which may cause Black to consider playing a different line if they wish to avoid the King's Gambit. It has been observed that one of the possible disadvantages of From's Gambit is that it is very easy for White to avoid.

If White accepts the gambit with 2.fxe5, Black must choose between the main line 2...d6 and the rather obscure 2...Nc6. After 2...Nc6, International Master (IM) Timothy Taylor, in his 2005 book on the Bird's, recommends 3.Nc3! Nxe5 4.d4 intending 5.e4, rather than 3.Nf3?! g5! when Black stands well. After the normal 2...d6 3.exd6 Bxd6, White must play 4.Nf3, avoiding 4.Nc3?? Qh4+ 5.g3 Qxg3+ 6.hxg3 Bxg3 checkmate. Then Black again has two alternatives: 4...g5 to drive away White's knight, and 4...Nf6, threatening 5...Ng4 and 6...Nxh2!

Future world champion Emanuel Lasker introduced 4...g5 in the game Bird–Lasker, Newcastle upon Tyne, 1892, so it is known as "Lasker's Variation". Taylor considers 4...g5 dubious; a quiet response that he considers favourable for White is 5.d4 g4 6.Ne5! (6.Ng5? leads to a dubious piece sacrifice) Bxe5 7.dxe5 Qxd1+ 8.Kxd1 Nc6 9.Nc3! Be6 (9...Nxe5?! 10.Bf4 f6 11.Nd5 Kd8 12.Nxf6!) 10.Bf4 0-0-0+ 11.Ke1 Nge7 12.e3 Ng6 13.Bg5 Rdf8 14.Bf6 Rhg8 15.Be2 Ngxe5 16.Rf1 "with the typical edge for White that is characteristic of this variation", according to Taylor.

He also considers the sharper 5.g3 g4 6.Nh4 favourable for White, giving as the main line 6...Ne7 7.d4 Ng6 8.Nxg6 hxg6 9.Qd3 Nc6 (9...Rh5 10.Bg2; 9...Na6 10.c3) 10.c3 (10.Nc3? Nxd4! 11.Qxd4?? Bxg3+ wins White's queen) Bf5 (10...Qe7 11.Bg2! Bd7 12.Nd2 0-0-0 13.Ne4! favoured White in Taylor–Becerra Rivero, Minneapolis 2005) 11.e4 Qe7 12.Bg2 0-0-0 13.Be3. According to Taylor, White has a large advantage in all lines, although play remains extremely sharp, e.g. 13...Rde8 14.Nd2; 13...Rxh2 14.Rxh2 Bxg3+ 15.Kd1 Bxh2 16.exf5! Re8 17.fxg6! Qxe3 18.Qxe3 Rxe3 19.gxf7; or 13...Bd7 (threatening 14...Rxh2!) 14.Bf2!

The worst response to From's Gambit is 2.g4??, since Black will respond with 2...Qh4#—the Fool's mate.

== Swiss Gambit: 1...f5 2.e4 ==
Position: a8 black rook, b8 black knight, c8 black bishop, d8 black queen, e8 black king, f8 black bishop, g8 black knight, h8 black rook, a7 black pawn, b7 black pawn, c7 black pawn, d7 black pawn, e7 black pawn, g7 black pawn, h7 black pawn, f5 black pawn, e4 white pawn, f4 white pawn, a2 white pawn, b2 white pawn, c2 white pawn, d2 white pawn, g2 white pawn, h2 white pawn, a1 white rook, b1 white knight, c1 white bishop, d1 white queen, e1 white king, f1 white bishop, g1 white knight, h1 white rook

Swiss Gambit: 1.f4 f5 2.e4

After the symmetrical response 1...f5, an aggressive response is 2.e4. The main line is 2...fxe4 3.d3, followed by 3...exd3 4.Bxd3 Nf6. Also possible are 3...e3 (returning the pawn) 4.Bxe3 Nf6 and 3...Nf6. After 3...exd3 4.Bxd3 Nf6 5.Nf3 (5.g4 is well met by 5...d5, when after 6.g5, 6...Bg4 and 6...Ne4 are seen as good for Black) d5 6.0-0, Timothy Taylor considers White to have some, but not enough, compensation for the sacrificed pawn.

The gambit was named by Polish theoretician Alexander Wagner (1868–1942) in an article entitled A New Gambit. The Swiss Gambit in 1912, proposing 2...fxe4 3.Nc3 Nf6 4.g4, known as the Wagner Gambit. He had introduced it in the Swiss correspondence game Wagner–Kostin, 1910–11. Chess historian Edward Winter has criticised the usage of the term "Swiss Gambit" for all lines beginning 2.e4. F.A. Lange, writing in the June 1859 Deutsche Schachzeitung, had already analysed the line 2.e4 fxe4 3.Nc3 Nf6 4.d3, which was played by many players, including Adolf Anderssen, in the 19th century.

Unrelated to this opening, term "Swiss Gambit" is also used colloquially to describe a strategy for Swiss system tournaments where a player intentionally loses or draws against weaker players early in the tournament, in the hope of being paired against weaker opposition in later rounds.

== Other Black responses ==
- The flexible 1...Nf6 is also possible. Then if White plays 2.b3?! (2.Nf3 is safer), 2...d6! 3.Bb2?! (or 3.Nf3 e5! 4.fxe5 dxe5 5.Nxe5?? Qd4!) e5!, a sort of From's Gambit Deferred introduced by IM Michael Brooks, is dangerous for White, e.g. 4.fxe5 dxe5 5.Bxe5 Ng4! Then 6.Bb2 Bd6 "leaves White in huge trouble down the e1–h4 diagonal", and Black wins an exchange after 7.Nf3 Bxh2! 8.Rxh2 Nxh2. After the alternative 6.Bg3, 6...Qf6! (even better than 6...Bd6) 7.c3 (not 7.Nc3? Ne3! 8.dxe3 Bb4) Bd6 is strong for Black.
- Another popular response is 1...g6, a sort of Modern Defence, which may transpose into a reversed Dutch Defence (if Black plays ...d5 and ...c5), or a Sicilian Defence (if White plays e4 and Black plays ...c5). Black thus prevents White from playing on the a1–h8 diagonal.
- Also reasonable is 1...c5, hoping for a transposition into the Tal Gambit, a favourable variation of the Sicilian Defence, after 2.e4 d5! 3.exd5 (3.Nc3, the mellifluously named "Toilet Variation", is also possible) 3...Nf6, but White need not oblige, and may build up more slowly with 2.Nf3, followed by g3, Bg2, d3, and possibly a later e4.
- The offbeat 1...b6!? is also known, and more soundly based than the same move after 1.e4 or 1.d4, since 1.f4 does not aid White's development, and weakens the a8–h1 diagonal as the move f3 is no longer available to shore up White's centre. Taylor recommends 2.e4 Bb7 3.d3 e6 4.Nf3 Ne7 5.c3 d5 6.Qc2 Nd7 7.Be3, with a spatial advantage for White.
- Also possible is 1...b5!?, a form of the Polish Defence. After the natural 2.e4 Bb7, White has no good way to protect e4 while maintaining their attack on b5, since 3.Nc3? b4 4.Nd5 e6 wins a pawn.
- If Black chooses the symmetrical reply 1...f5, Taylor considers White's best line to be quiet play with 2.b3 b6 3.Bb2 Bb7 4.e3, when 4...Nf6 5.Bxf6! exf6 6.Nf3 left White with the better pawn structure in Larsen–Colon Romero, San Juan 1969. Instead, 4...e6 5.Qh5+ forces the weakening 5...g6, with a slight advantage to White according to Taylor. Also possible is the aggressive 2.e4!?, leading to the Swiss Gambit mentioned above.
- An aggressive but rare response is 1...g5?!, the Hobbs Gambit, with play possibly continuing 2.fxg5 h6, a sort of mirror image Benko Gambit. White can simply return the pawn with 3.g6, leaving Black with a weakened kingside after 3...fxg6. A variant is the Hobbs–Zilbermints Gambit, 1...h6 intending 2...g5; against this, White could proceed with 2.e4 g5 3.d4, when Black has lost time and weakened their kingside.
- Another offbeat try is Martin Appleberry's 1...Nh6!?, also known as the Horsefly, which exploits the closed c1–h6 diagonal. One idea is to meet 2.b3 with 2...e5, another deferred From Gambit, and 2.e4 with 2...d5, when 3.exd5 Qxd5 would result in a Scandinavian Defence where White's pawn is oddly placed on f4. The response 2.Nf3, however, avoids both of these lines. The primary objective of the Horsefly is to retain control of e5, preventing the Stonewall Attack, but otherwise giving White great flexibility.
- Another possible reply by Black is 1...Nc6. With this move, Black lays the support for the advance of the e-pawn. The general sequence of moves that Black may opt for is ...g6, ...Bg7, and ...d6 and eventually advance the e-pawn.
- Another possible reply is 1...e6. This exploits the weakness created by 1.f4 on the e1–h4 diagonal by releasing the queen, and also releases the king's bishop without offering a pawn, unlike the From Gambit. White should avoid playing 2.g4?? as it leads to 2...Qh4# (a variation of the Fool's mate). 2.e4 transposes to the La Bourdonnais Variation of the French Defence (the normal order being 1.e4 e6 2.f4).

== Popularity ==
Out of the twenty possible opening moves, 1.f4 ranks sixth in popularity in Chessgames.com's database, behind 1.e4, 1.d4, 1.Nf3, 1.c4, and 1.g3. It is less than one-twentieth as popular as the mirror image English Opening (1.c4). The move 1.f4 slightly weakens White's king's position. Chessgames.com's statistics indicate that the opening is not an effective way of preserving White's first-move advantage: as of February 2013, out of 3,872 games with 1.f4, White had won 30.7%, drawn 32%, and lost 37.7%, for a total score of 46.7%. White scores much better with the more popular 1.e4 (54.25%), 1.d4 (55.95%), 1.Nf3 (55.8%), 1.c4 (56.3%), and 1.g3 (55.8%), as well as with the less popular 1.b3 (52.5%).

According to the similar site 365chess.com, which includes data for lower-level games, as of August 2015, out of 20,010 games with 1.f4, White had won 35.1%, drawn 25%, and lost 39.9%, for a total score of 47.6%. The five more popular openings are still substantially more successful for White: 1.e4 (53.15%), 1.d4 (54.8%), 1.Nf3 (55.4%), 1.c4 (54.65%), and 1.g3 (54.9%).

On Lichess, in the 1600–2200 rating range in rapid, classical, and correspondence time controls, White wins 50% of the time while losing 45% of the time in the 2,600,000 games in their database. In those games the most common responses to 1.f4 are d5 (41%), e6 (11%), c5 (9%), e5 (7%), and Nf6 (7%). Black's most successful response to Bird's Opening in that rating range is e5, where Black's win percentage is 50–46%, but that evens to 48–48% when White plays 2.fxe5.

== See also ==
- List of chess openings
- List of chess openings named after people

== Bibliography ==
- Adorján, András (1998). Black is O.K. in Rare Openings. CAISSA Ltd.
- de Firmian, Nick (2008). Modern Chess Openings (15th ed.). Random House Puzzles & Games. ISBN 978-0-8129-3682-7.
- Hooper, David; Whyld, Kenneth (1996) [First pub. 1992]. The Oxford Companion to Chess (2nd ed.). Oxford University Press. ISBN 0-19-280049-3.
- Palliser, Richard (2006). Beating Unusual Chess Openings. Gloucester Publishers. ISBN 978-1-85744-429-2.
- Taylor, Timothy (2005). Bird's Opening: Detailed Coverage of an Underrated and Dynamic Choice for White. Gloucester Publishers. ISBN 1-85744-402-7.
