= Inverted Hungarian Opening =

Position: a8 black rook, c8 black bishop, d8 black queen, e8 black king, f8 black bishop, g8 black knight, h8 black rook, a7 black pawn, b7 black pawn, c7 black pawn, d7 black pawn, f7 black pawn, g7 black pawn, h7 black pawn, c6 black knight, e5 black pawn, e4 white pawn, f3 white knight, a2 white pawn, b2 white pawn, c2 white pawn, d2 white pawn, e2 white bishop, f2 white pawn, g2 white pawn, h2 white pawn, a1 white rook, b1 white knight, c1 white bishop, d1 white queen, e1 white king, h1 white rook
- Moves: 1.e4 e5 2.Nf3 Nc6 3.Be2
- ECO: C44
- Named after: Hungarian Defense
- Parent: King's Knight Opening
- Synonym(s): Tayler Opening; Inverted Hanham Opening

The Inverted Hungarian Opening or Tayler Opening is an uncommon chess opening that starts with the moves:

1. e4 e5
2. Nf3 Nc6
3. Be2

It is so-named because the position of White's bishop on e2 resembles that of Black's bishop on e7 in the Hungarian Defense. "This opening is also known as the Inverted Hanham and was played most prominently by Tartakower against Bogoljubow at London 1922."

== Description ==
The Inverted Hungarian is even rarer than the already very uncommon Hungarian Defense, although it is perfectly playable for White. It may appeal to White players who wish to avoid extensively analyzed double king pawn openings such as the Ruy Lopez, and to those who favor defensive positional maneuvering battles as also often result from the Hungarian Defense. With the advantage of the first move, White has greater latitude to play moves that are not objectively the strongest without incurring disadvantage.

Since White's third move 3.Be2 makes no threats, there are many satisfactory replies for Black. If White plays a setup resembling the Black side of the Hanham Variation of the Philidor Defense (3...Nf6 4.d3 d5 5.Nbd2), the opening is sometimes called the Inverted Hanham Opening.

After 3...Nf6, John Tayler introduced the line 4.d4!? and published analysis in Chess, February–March 1981. The gambit was picked up by Michael Basman who further developed it, the critical line runs: 4...exd4 5.e5 Ng4! 6.0-0 (6.Bf4 d6) 6...Be7 (6...Ngxe5 7.Nxe5 Nxe5 8.Qxd4 Nc6 9.Qc3 and Black has problems with kingside development; Basman) 7.Nxd4 Ngxe5 8.f4 Nxd4 9.Qxd4 Ng6! 10.f5 (10.Qxg7 Bf6 11.Qh6!?) 10...Bf6 11.Qf2 Ne7.

== See also ==
- List of chess openings
- List of chess openings named after places

== Bibliography ==
- Benjamin, Joel; Schiller, Eric (1987). "Tayler Opening". Unorthodox Openings. Macmillan Publishing Company. pp. 36–37. ISBN 0-02-016590-0.
- Hooper, David; Whyld, Kenneth (1996) [First pub. 1992]. The Oxford Companion to Chess (2nd ed.). Oxford University Press. p. 182. ISBN 0-19-280049-3.
