= Centre Pawn Opening =

Chess opening

Position: a8 black rook, b8 black knight, c8 black bishop, d8 black queen, e8 black king, f8 black bishop, g8 black knight, h8 black rook, a7 black pawn, b7 black pawn, c7 black pawn, d7 black pawn, f7 black pawn, g7 black pawn, h7 black pawn, e5 black pawn, e4 white pawn, c3 white pawn, a2 white pawn, b2 white pawn, d2 white pawn, f2 white pawn, g2 white pawn, h2 white pawn, a1 white rook, b1 white knight, c1 white bishop, d1 white queen, e1 white king, f1 white bishop, g1 white knight, h1 white rook
- Moves: 1.e4 e5 2.c3
- ECO: C20
- Parent: Open Game
- Synonym: MacLeod Attack

The Centre Pawn Opening (or the MacLeod Attack) is a chess opening characterised by the moves:

1. e4 e5
2. c3

The opening was analysed by Ruy López in his 1561 book, but has never been popular. It was played 17 times in the New York 1889 tournament by the Canadian master Nicholas MacLeod but has otherwise arisen rarely in tournament play.

== Discussion ==
White's second move prepares to push a pawn to d4, establishing a strong centre. Play can potentially transpose to other openings, most likely the Ponziani Opening or the Göring Gambit in the Scotch Game. Eric Schiller states, however, that the opening is too slow, that Black can respond vigorously with 2...d5! to eliminate transpositional possibilities and solve all his opening problems, as after 3.exd5 Qxd5, the move 4.Nc3 is not available to chase the queen away and gain a tempo.

After 2...d5, MacLeod played 3.Nf3 in MacLeod–Gossip, New York 1889, which continued 3...dxe4 (3...Nc6 is the Ponziani) 4.Nxe5 Qd5 (4...Bd6 5.Nc4 Be6 6.d4 exd3=) 5.d4 exd3 6.Nd3 with an equal game after move 10 (Keres).

After 2...Nf6 3.d4, Rusakov–Verlinsky, USSR 1947, continued 3...Nc6 (3...Nxe4 was tried in Morphy–Bottin, Paris 1858) 4.Bg5 h6 5.Bh4 g5 6.Bg3 exd4 7.e5 dxc3, where 8.Nxc3! would have given White the upper hand with more space (Keres).

== Bibliography ==
- Hooper, David; Whyld, Kenneth (1992). The Oxford Companion to Chess (2nd ed.). Oxford University Press. ISBN 0-19-280049-3.
- Matanović, Aleksandar, ed. (1981). Encyclopaedia of Chess Openings. Vol. C (2nd ed.). Yugoslavia: Chess Informant.
- Schiller, Eric (2003). Unorthodox Chess Openings. Cardoza Publishing. ISBN 1-58042-072-9.
