= Open Game =

Position: a8 black rook, b8 black knight, c8 black bishop, d8 black queen, e8 black king, f8 black bishop, g8 black knight, h8 black rook, a7 black pawn, b7 black pawn, c7 black pawn, d7 black pawn, f7 black pawn, g7 black pawn, h7 black pawn, e5 black pawn, e4 white pawn, a2 white pawn, b2 white pawn, c2 white pawn, d2 white pawn, f2 white pawn, g2 white pawn, h2 white pawn, a1 white rook, b1 white knight, c1 white bishop, d1 white queen, e1 white king, f1 white bishop, g1 white knight, h1 white rook
- Moves: 1.e4 e5
- ECO: C20–C99
- Parent: King's Pawn Game
- Synonyms: Double King's Pawn Opening; Double King's Pawn Game

Open Game (or Double King's Pawn Opening) is a generic term for a family of chess openings beginning with the moves:

1. e4 e5

The most popular second move for White is 2.Nf3, attacking Black's pawn and supporting the pawn advance d2–d4. The Open Games include many of the oldest and most deeply analyzed openings in chess. They are often among the first openings taught to beginners and remain frequently played at all levels.

Two of the most analyzed of the Open Games are the Ruy Lopez (1.e4 e5 2.Nf3 Nc6 3.Bb5) and the Italian Game (1.e4 e5 2.Nf3 Nc6 3.Bc4). Also popular are the Scotch Game (1.e4 e5 2.Nf3 Nc6 3.d4) and the Petrov Defense (1.e4 e5 2.Nf3 Nf6).

When written in lowercase, the term "open game" can be used to refer to "open" chess positions, which feature open lines, meaning unobstructed files and diagonals; these increase piece mobility and often lead to tactical gameplay. While 1.e4 e5 tends to lead to open positions, this is not always the case. Other responses to 1.e4 are termed Semi-Open Games.

== Overview ==
White's most popular first move, 1.e4, moving the king pawn two squares, immediately stakes a claim in the center and frees two pieces (the queen and king's bishop) for development. Bobby Fischer called 1.e4 "Best by test." On the negative side, 1.e4 places a pawn on an undefended square and weakens the squares d4 and f4 (White can no longer play e3). The symmetrical 1...e5 incurs similar strengths and drawbacks for Black.

White's response 2.Nf3 attacks Black's undefended king pawn, prepares to castle kingside, and supports playing d2–d4 in many lines. Black typically defends the pawn with 2...Nc6. The counterattack 2...Nf6 is also common and sound. Defending with 2...d6 is also seen, but 2...f6 is unsound.

1...e5 was the most common response to 1.e4 for centuries, though sometime in the mid-20th century the unbalancing move 1...c5, the Sicilian Defense, became slightly more popular among tournament players.

== 2.Nf3 Nc6 ==
Ruy Lopez

Position: a8 black rook, c8 black bishop, d8 black queen, e8 black king, f8 black bishop, g8 black knight, h8 black rook, a7 black pawn, b7 black pawn, c7 black pawn, d7 black pawn, f7 black pawn, g7 black pawn, h7 black pawn, c6 black knight, b5 white bishop, e5 black pawn, e4 white pawn, f3 white knight, a2 white pawn, b2 white pawn, c2 white pawn, d2 white pawn, f2 white pawn, g2 white pawn, h2 white pawn, a1 white rook, b1 white knight, c1 white bishop, d1 white queen, e1 white king, h1 white rook

1.e4 e5 2.Nf3 Nc6 3.Bb5
Italian Game

Position: a8 black rook, c8 black bishop, d8 black queen, e8 black king, f8 black bishop, g8 black knight, h8 black rook, a7 black pawn, b7 black pawn, c7 black pawn, d7 black pawn, f7 black pawn, g7 black pawn, h7 black pawn, c6 black knight, e5 black pawn, c4 white bishop, e4 white pawn, f3 white knight, a2 white pawn, b2 white pawn, c2 white pawn, d2 white pawn, f2 white pawn, g2 white pawn, h2 white pawn, a1 white rook, b1 white knight, c1 white bishop, d1 white queen, e1 white king, h1 white rook

1.e4 e5 2.Nf3 Nc6 3.Bc4
Scotch Game

Position: a8 black rook, c8 black bishop, d8 black queen, e8 black king, f8 black bishop, g8 black knight, h8 black rook, a7 black pawn, b7 black pawn, c7 black pawn, d7 black pawn, f7 black pawn, g7 black pawn, h7 black pawn, c6 black knight, e5 black pawn, d4 white pawn, e4 white pawn, f3 white knight, a2 white pawn, b2 white pawn, c2 white pawn, f2 white pawn, g2 white pawn, h2 white pawn, a1 white rook, b1 white knight, c1 white bishop, d1 white queen, e1 white king, f1 white bishop, h1 white rook

1.e4 e5 2.Nf3 Nc6 3.d4
Four Knights Game

Position: a8 black rook, c8 black bishop, d8 black queen, e8 black king, f8 black bishop, h8 black rook, a7 black pawn, b7 black pawn, c7 black pawn, d7 black pawn, f7 black pawn, g7 black pawn, h7 black pawn, c6 black knight, f6 black knight, e5 black pawn, e4 white pawn, c3 white knight, f3 white knight, a2 white pawn, b2 white pawn, c2 white pawn, d2 white pawn, f2 white pawn, g2 white pawn, h2 white pawn, a1 white rook, c1 white bishop, d1 white queen, e1 white king, f1 white bishop, h1 white rook

1.e4 e5 2.Nf3 Nc6 3.Nc3 Nf6

Black's usual reply to 2.Nf3 is 2...Nc6, defending the king's pawn from White's knight and developing Black's own knight. From here, several named openings can arise:

- 3.Bb5, the Ruy Lopez, also known as the Spanish Game or Spanish Opening, is White's most frequent move at the top level, and one of the most extensively played and analyzed openings at all levels of chess. Black's most common response is 3...a6, forcing White to make a decision between exchanging the bishop for the knight with 4.Bxc6 or retreating with 4.Ba4. Also common is 3...Nf6, the Berlin Defense. Black has several alternatives, the sharpest of which is 3...f5, the Jaenisch Gambit (or Schliemann Defense).
- 3.Bc4, the Italian Game, is White's second most popular move, and has been extensively analyzed for hundreds of years. It usually leads to either the Giuoco Piano (3...Bc5) or the Two Knights Defense (3...Nf6), where White may play 4.Ng5, 4.d4, or 4.d3. In the Giuoco Piano, White can play 4.c3 and 5.d4, the classical approach; 4.b4, a sharp pawn sacrifice known as the Evans Gambit; or 4.c3 and 5.d3 (also reached with other move orders), the modern approach, among various other plans.
- 3.d4, the Scotch Game, was popular in the 19th century and is still the third most common move. After the usual 3...exd4, White may either recapture with 4.Nxd4 with an approximately equal game, or play the Scotch Gambit (4.Bc4), a risky but dangerous tactical line against an unprepared opponent.
- 3.Nc3, the Three Knights Game, was also a popular move in the 19th century and is still occasionally played at the top level. Black's usual reply is 3...Nf6, the Four Knights Game. It frequently leads to positional games and is generally considered less challenging for Black to defend against than the three lines above.
- 3.c3, the Ponziani Opening, has never achieved widespread popularity but is occasionally used as a surprise weapon.

Other third moves for White such as the Konstantinopolsky Opening (3.g3) and Inverted Hungarian Opening (3.Be2) are rarely played and offer White no advantage.

== Alternatives to 2...Nc6 ==
Petrov's Defense

Position: a8 black rook, b8 black knight, c8 black bishop, d8 black queen, e8 black king, f8 black bishop, h8 black rook, a7 black pawn, b7 black pawn, c7 black pawn, d7 black pawn, f7 black pawn, g7 black pawn, h7 black pawn, f6 black knight, e5 black pawn, e4 white pawn, f3 white knight, a2 white pawn, b2 white pawn, c2 white pawn, d2 white pawn, f2 white pawn, g2 white pawn, h2 white pawn, a1 white rook, b1 white knight, c1 white bishop, d1 white queen, e1 white king, f1 white bishop, h1 white rook

1.e4 e5 2.Nf3 Nf6
Philidor Defense

Position: a8 black rook, b8 black knight, c8 black bishop, d8 black queen, e8 black king, f8 black bishop, g8 black knight, h8 black rook, a7 black pawn, b7 black pawn, c7 black pawn, f7 black pawn, g7 black pawn, h7 black pawn, d6 black pawn, e5 black pawn, e4 white pawn, f3 white knight, a2 white pawn, b2 white pawn, c2 white pawn, d2 white pawn, f2 white pawn, g2 white pawn, h2 white pawn, a1 white rook, b1 white knight, c1 white bishop, d1 white queen, e1 white king, f1 white bishop, h1 white rook

1.e4 e5 2.Nf3 d6
Latvian Gambit

Position: a8 black rook, b8 black knight, c8 black bishop, d8 black queen, e8 black king, f8 black bishop, g8 black knight, h8 black rook, a7 black pawn, b7 black pawn, c7 black pawn, d7 black pawn, g7 black pawn, h7 black pawn, e5 black pawn, f5 black pawn, e4 white pawn, f3 white knight, a2 white pawn, b2 white pawn, c2 white pawn, d2 white pawn, f2 white pawn, g2 white pawn, h2 white pawn, a1 white rook, b1 white knight, c1 white bishop, d1 white queen, e1 white king, f1 white bishop, h1 white rook

1.e4 e5 2.Nf3 f5
Elephant Gambit

Position: a8 black rook, b8 black knight, c8 black bishop, d8 black queen, e8 black king, f8 black bishop, g8 black knight, h8 black rook, a7 black pawn, b7 black pawn, c7 black pawn, f7 black pawn, g7 black pawn, h7 black pawn, d5 black pawn, e5 black pawn, e4 white pawn, f3 white knight, a2 white pawn, b2 white pawn, c2 white pawn, d2 white pawn, f2 white pawn, g2 white pawn, h2 white pawn, a1 white rook, b1 white knight, c1 white bishop, d1 white queen, e1 white king, f1 white bishop, h1 white rook

1.e4 e5 2.Nf3 d5

After 2.Nf3, there are two main alternatives to 2...Nc6:

- 2...Nf6, the Petrov Defense, a popular choice at the top level. It has a drawish reputation but there are many sharp lines. After 3.Nxe5, Black should reply 3...d6 4.Nf3 Nxe4; the natural looking 3..Nxe4?! is insufficient for equality after 4.Qe2. Besides 3.Nxe5, White may also play 3.d4. Alternatively, White can avoid the extensive theory of the Petrov with 3.Nc3, which often transposes into a Four Knights Game with 3...Nc6.
- 2...d6, the Philidor Defense, defends the pawn on e5 but has the disadvantage of restricting the mobility of Black's king's bishop, and typically leads to solid but passive positions for Black. For this reason, it largely fell out of favor by the early 20th century as Black players sought more dynamic options, but it has a dependable reputation.

The following moves are rare and generally considered dubious:

- 2...f5, the Latvian Gambit, a risky pawn sacrifice.
- 2...d5, the Elephant Gambit, another risky pawn sacrifice.
- 2...Qe7, the Gunderam Defense, an eccentric defense which blocks the development of the king's bishop.
- 2...Qf6, the Greco Defense, is weak, exposing the queen to early attack and taking up the king's knight's natural square.
- 2...f6, the Damiano Defense, is weak and may be met by either 3.Nxe5 or 3.Bc4 with advantage for White.
- 2...Bc5, the Busch–Gass Gambit, was something of an online fad in the early 2020s. It is well met by 3.Nxe5 Nc6 4.Nf3.

== Alternatives to 2.Nf3 ==
King's Gambit

Position: a8 black rook, b8 black knight, c8 black bishop, d8 black queen, e8 black king, f8 black bishop, g8 black knight, h8 black rook, a7 black pawn, b7 black pawn, c7 black pawn, d7 black pawn, f7 black pawn, g7 black pawn, h7 black pawn, e5 black pawn, e4 white pawn, f4 white pawn, a2 white pawn, b2 white pawn, c2 white pawn, d2 white pawn, g2 white pawn, h2 white pawn, a1 white rook, b1 white knight, c1 white bishop, d1 white queen, e1 white king, f1 white bishop, g1 white knight, h1 white rook

1.e4 e5 2.f4
Vienna Game

Position: a8 black rook, b8 black knight, c8 black bishop, d8 black queen, e8 black king, f8 black bishop, g8 black knight, h8 black rook, a7 black pawn, b7 black pawn, c7 black pawn, d7 black pawn, f7 black pawn, g7 black pawn, h7 black pawn, e5 black pawn, e4 white pawn, c3 white knight, a2 white pawn, b2 white pawn, c2 white pawn, d2 white pawn, f2 white pawn, g2 white pawn, h2 white pawn, a1 white rook, c1 white bishop, d1 white queen, e1 white king, f1 white bishop, g1 white knight, h1 white rook

1.e4 e5 2.Nc3
Bishop's Opening

Position: a8 black rook, b8 black knight, c8 black bishop, d8 black queen, e8 black king, f8 black bishop, g8 black knight, h8 black rook, a7 black pawn, b7 black pawn, c7 black pawn, d7 black pawn, f7 black pawn, g7 black pawn, h7 black pawn, e5 black pawn, c4 white bishop, e4 white pawn, a2 white pawn, b2 white pawn, c2 white pawn, d2 white pawn, f2 white pawn, g2 white pawn, h2 white pawn, a1 white rook, b1 white knight, c1 white bishop, d1 white queen, e1 white king, g1 white knight, h1 white rook

1.e4 e5 2.Bc4
Center Game

Position: a8 black rook, b8 black knight, c8 black bishop, d8 black queen, e8 black king, f8 black bishop, g8 black knight, h8 black rook, a7 black pawn, b7 black pawn, c7 black pawn, d7 black pawn, f7 black pawn, g7 black pawn, h7 black pawn, e5 black pawn, d4 white pawn, e4 white pawn, a2 white pawn, b2 white pawn, c2 white pawn, f2 white pawn, g2 white pawn, h2 white pawn, a1 white rook, b1 white knight, c1 white bishop, d1 white queen, e1 white king, f1 white bishop, g1 white knight, h1 white rook

1.e4 e5 2.d4

White has four frequent alternatives to 2.Nf3:

- 2.f4, the King's Gambit, where White offers a pawn to undermine Black's center and achieve quick development. It was very popular before the 20th century with master and amateur alike. Black often accepts the pawn by playing 2...exf4, but there are alternatives, such as 2...d5, the Falkbeer Countergambit, which counterattacks in the center.
- 2.Nc3, the Vienna Game, which became popular for a while in the 19th century, also frequently features such attacks on Black's center by means of f2–f4, but there are multiple alternative plans, such as 3.Bc4, developing the bishop to an active square, and 3.g3, intending to fianchetto with Bg2.
- 2.Bc4, the Bishop's Opening, was also more popular in the past. It often transposes to the Italian Game or Vienna Game, but there are several independent lines.
- 2.d4 is the Center Game, in which White immediately opens up the center. After the recapture 2...exd4 3.Qxd4, Black gains a tempo by attacking White's queen with 3...Nc6. An alternative is to sacrifice one or two pawns by offering the Danish Gambit (3.c3); however, a safe practical reply for Black is to decline the gambit with 3...d5.

Other second moves are rare and do not gain any advantage against correct play:

- 2.Qh5, the Danvers Opening, also known as the Parham Attack or Wayward Queen Attack, is usually played only by amateurs, though Hikaru Nakamura has experimented with it in grandmaster tournaments.
- 2.Qf3, the Napoleon Opening, has even less to recommend it as Black can easily block any mating threats without compromising development.
- 2.Bb5, the Portuguese Opening, rarely played and well met by 2...c6 or 2...Nf6.
- 2.Ne2, Alapin's Opening, another offbeat try for White.
- 2.Ke2, the Bongcloud Attack, considered a joke opening.

== See also ==
- Closed Game (1.d4 d5)
- Flank opening (1.c4, 1.Nf3, 1.f4, and others)
- Irregular chess opening
- King's Pawn Game
- List of chess openings
- Semi-Closed Game (1.d4 other)
- Semi-Open Game (1.e4 other)
