= Ware Opening =

Chess opening

Position: a8 black rook, b8 black knight, c8 black bishop, d8 black queen, e8 black king, f8 black bishop, g8 black knight, h8 black rook, a7 black pawn, b7 black pawn, c7 black pawn, d7 black pawn, e7 black pawn, f7 black pawn, g7 black pawn, h7 black pawn, a4 white pawn, b2 white pawn, c2 white pawn, d2 white pawn, e2 white pawn, f2 white pawn, g2 white pawn, h2 white pawn, a1 white rook, b1 white knight, c1 white bishop, d1 white queen, e1 white king, f1 white bishop, g1 white knight, h1 white rook
- Moves: 1.a4
- ECO: A00
- Named after: Preston Ware
- Synonym: Meadow Hay Opening

The Ware Opening, also known as Meadow Hay Opening, is an uncommon chess opening for White beginning with the move:

1. a4

It is named after Preston Ware, a U.S. chess player who often played uncommon openings. The Ware is considered an irregular opening; it is classified under the A00 code in the Encyclopaedia of Chess Openings.

== Opening idea ==
The Ware Opening attacks the b5-square and prepares to bring the a1-rook into the game. The b5-square is non-essential and if Black plays 1...e5, the f8-bishop prevents the development of the white rook for the moment. The reply 1...e5 also gains space for Black in the center, a typical objective of most openings but one completely ignored by the Ware Opening. Noting all this, the Ware Opening is normally played only by players who are completely new to chess.

An experienced player using the Ware Opening will usually meet a response of 1...d5 or 1...e5 with 2.d4 or 2.e4, respectively, since a reversed Scandinavian or Englund Gambit would be unsound here. After 1...d5 2.Nf3, 2...Nf6 is recommended, since a reversed Fajarowicz can arise after 2...c5 3.e4!? dxe4 4.Ne5 where a2–a4 has some utility.

In the 2012 World Blitz Championship, 1.a4 was employed as a little joke by Magnus Carlsen against Teimour Radjabov, who during the blitz championship two years earlier had told him "Everyone is getting tired. You might as well start with 1.a4 and you can still beat them." The game soon turned into a sort of Four Knights Game where Carlsen finally prevailed.

Carlsen also played this in the blitz portion of the Norway Chess 2022 tournament, ultimately losing to Wesley So, who went on to win the tournament.

== Variations ==
There are several named variations of the Ware Opening. The best known of these are:

- 1...e5 2.a5 d5 3.e3 f5 4.a6 (Ware Gambit). In this variation, White attempts to create an open file in exchange for a pawn.
- 1...e5 2.h4 (Crab Variation). This version is generally chosen more for its aesthetic considerations than its strategic ones; White's pawns extend like a crab's pincers, preparing to attack on the sides.
- 1...b6 2.d4 d5 3.Nc3 Nd7 (Cologne Gambit).
- 1...b5 2.axb5 Bb7 (Wing Gambit of the Ware Opening).
- 1...a5 (Symmetric Variation).
- 1...e5 2.Ra3 (Meadow Hay Trap/Meadow Hay Mistake).

== See also ==
- Corn Stalk Defense – sometimes known as the "Ware Defense"
- List of chess openings
- List of chess openings named after people
