= Grob's Attack =

Position: a8 black rook, b8 black knight, c8 black bishop, d8 black queen, e8 black king, f8 black bishop, g8 black knight, h8 black rook, a7 black pawn, b7 black pawn, c7 black pawn, d7 black pawn, e7 black pawn, f7 black pawn, g7 black pawn, h7 black pawn, g4 white pawn, a2 white pawn, b2 white pawn, c2 white pawn, d2 white pawn, e2 white pawn, f2 white pawn, h2 white pawn, a1 white rook, b1 white knight, c1 white bishop, d1 white queen, e1 white king, f1 white bishop, g1 white knight, h1 white rook
- Moves: 1.g4
- ECO: A00
- Named after: Henri Grob
- Synonyms: Grob Opening; Spike Opening; Ahlhausen's Opening; Genoa Opening; San Pier D'Arena Opening; Fric's Opening; Kolibri's Opening

Grob's Attack, or the Grob Opening, is an unconventional chess opening in which White begins with the move:

1. g4

It is widely considered to be one of the worst possible first moves for White. International Master (IM) John Watson writes, "As far as I can tell, 1 g4 is competitive with 1 h4 for the honour of being White's worst first move. Against an informed or skilled opponent, it is simply masochistic."

== History and usage ==
The opening takes its name from Swiss IM Henri Grob (1904–1974) who analyzed it extensively and played hundreds of correspondence games with it. In Grob's newspaper column analysis of this opening, he referred to it as the Spike Opening, a name which is still used occasionally. Other early references used the name Ahlhausen's Opening, after Carl Ahlhausen (1835–1892) of Berlin, one of the first to play 1.g4. Savielly Tartakower sometimes played this opening in simultaneous exhibitions and called it the Genoa or San Pier D'Arena Opening, after the city and suburb of Genoa where he first used it.

Along with several other uncommon first moves for White, the Grob is classified under the code A00 ("irregular openings" or "uncommon openings") in the Encyclopedia of Chess Openings. White has three main plans: to support the g4-pawn with h3; pressure against d5 or on the h1–a8 diagonal, preventing Black from playing ...Bxg4 (e.g. 1.g4 d5 2.Bg2 Bxg4 3.c4, exploiting the pin against the b7-pawn); or advancing the h-pawn in a kingside attack.

Perhaps the highest-profile game to feature the Grob was when Michael Basman defeated Grandmaster (GM) John Nunn with it in 1978. The Grob was also forced upon Anatoly Karpov by former Soviet premier Mikhail Gorbachev in a friendly match against Susan Polgar in Lindsborg, Kansas 2005. Gorbachev made the ceremonial first move and played 1.g4. Normally players can simply retract ceremonial moves they do not like. In this case Gorbachev insisted Karpov play on, saying he wanted to "cause some difficulties for the older player". Karpov won the game.

The Grob was included in the opening book for the superfinal of the 12th Top Chess Engine Championship season (April–July 2018). Both finalists, Stockfish and Komodo, evaluated the position after 1.g4 as providing a clear advantage for Black, and both failed to defend the White position.

== Responses ==
Despite its dubious theoretical reputation, in practical play Grob's Attack wins at least as often as it loses against almost any reply by Black, according to database of 477 Grob-attack games on chessgames.com.

IM Michael Basman and GM Spyridon Skembris are advocates of the opening. It has a certain surprise value, and the average player is unlikely to know how to refute it and more likely to get overconfident and make mistakes. Moreover, the lack of theory along this line may negate the repertoire of an experienced opponent.

Intuitive play by Black can lead into dangerous traps. Many of these traps rely on Black replying with 1...d5, attacking the pawn with the queen's bishop. White can sacrifice the pawn with 2.Bg2 Bxg4 3.c4 with Qb3 to follow, giving White some pressure against the weakened squares d5 and b7.

Position: a8 black rook, b8 black knight, d8 black queen, e8 black king, f8 black bishop, g8 black knight, h8 black rook, a7 black pawn, b7 black pawn, c7 black pawn, e7 black pawn, f7 black pawn, g7 black pawn, h7 black pawn, d5 black pawn, c4 white pawn, g4 black bishop, a2 white pawn, b2 white pawn, d2 white pawn, e2 white pawn, f2 white pawn, g2 white bishop, h2 white pawn, a1 white rook, b1 white knight, c1 white bishop, d1 white queen, e1 white king, g1 white knight, h1 white rook

After 1.g4 d5 2.Bg2 Bxg4 3.c4

Position: a8 black rook, d8 black queen, e8 black king, f8 black bishop, g8 black knight, h8 black rook, a7 black pawn, b7 white bishop, c7 black pawn, d7 black knight, e7 black pawn, f7 black pawn, g7 black pawn, h7 black pawn, c4 white pawn, d4 black pawn, g4 black bishop, a2 white pawn, b2 white pawn, d2 white pawn, e2 white pawn, f2 white pawn, h2 white pawn, a1 white rook, b1 white knight, c1 white bishop, d1 white queen, e1 white king, g1 white knight, h1 white rook

After 3.c4 d4 4.Bxb7 Nd7

Position: a8 black queen, e8 black king, f8 black bishop, g8 black knight, h8 black rook, a7 black pawn, c7 black pawn, d7 black knight, e7 black pawn, f7 black pawn, g7 black pawn, h7 black pawn, c4 white pawn, g4 black bishop, d3 black pawn, f3 white pawn, a2 white pawn, b2 white pawn, d2 white pawn, e2 white pawn, h2 white pawn, a1 white rook, b1 white knight, c1 white bishop, d1 white queen, e1 white king, g1 white knight, h1 white rook

Romford Countergambit, after 5.Bxa8 Qxa8 6.f3 d3!

Position: a8 black rook, b8 black knight, c8 black bishop, d8 black queen, e8 black king, f8 black bishop, g8 black knight, h8 black rook, a7 black pawn, b7 black pawn, f7 black pawn, g7 black pawn, h7 black pawn, c6 black pawn, d5 black pawn, e5 black pawn, g4 white pawn, h3 white pawn, a2 white pawn, b2 white pawn, c2 white pawn, d2 white pawn, e2 white pawn, f2 white pawn, g2 white bishop, a1 white rook, b1 white knight, c1 white bishop, d1 white queen, e1 white king, g1 white knight, h1 white rook

Keene Defense: 1.g4 d5 2.h3 e5 3.Bg2 c6

Black is not obliged to give White these opportunities. In response to Grob's Attack, Black may also play 1...e5. Good responses would be 2.Bg2 (dominating the light-squared center diagonal) or 2.c4, the English Variation, preparing Nc3 to solidify White's control of d5. After 1...e5, Black can take aim at the h4-square, left weak by White's pawn advance. 2.Bg2 h5 will force a weakening of White's pawn structure. 2.d3 (intending to answer 2...h5 with 3.g5) or 2.h3 can be answered by 2...Ne7 with the threat of ...Ng6 followed by ...Nf4 or ...Nh4, disrupting White's kingside fianchetto. The Keene Defense for Black is a strong response, with 1.g4 d5 2.h3 e5 3.Bg2 c6.

Another frequently used setup for White in the Grob is 1.g4, 2.h3, and 3.Bg2. A Black counter-setup might be 1...d5, 2...e5, and 3...c6 (these moves may be played in any order), which, if used in conjunction with an eventual ...e4, negates White's king bishop's influence over the center. IM Richard Palliser advocates instead the classical setup 1...d5, 2...e5, 3...Nc6, on the grounds that White is more likely to be familiar with the "reversed French" lines after 3...c6 4.d4 e4 5.c4 etc.

A key element of the Grob is deploying the king's bishop on g2 and having it rule the diagonal. In order to further this goal, White must keep the center clear of pawns. This leads to frequent "tearing at the center" with c4 often being White's third move.

Due to the unusual pawn structure White attains by playing g4 and c4 so early in the game, there is frequently little advantage to castling. Play often devolves into a wild and wide-open game, with a definitive advantage usually resolving itself in the first 20 moves.

Responses other than 1...d5 and 1...e5 are rarely encountered in serious games, though some such as 1...c5 and 1...Nc6 are reasonable.

== See also ==
- Irregular chess openings
- List of chess openings
- List of chess openings named after people
