= Alapin's Opening =

Position: a8 black rook, b8 black knight, c8 black bishop, d8 black queen, e8 black king, f8 black bishop, g8 black knight, h8 black rook, a7 black pawn, b7 black pawn, c7 black pawn, d7 black pawn, f7 black pawn, g7 black pawn, h7 black pawn, e5 black pawn, e4 white pawn, a2 white pawn, b2 white pawn, c2 white pawn, d2 white pawn, e2 white knight, f2 white pawn, g2 white pawn, h2 white pawn, a1 white rook, b1 white knight, c1 white bishop, d1 white queen, e1 white king, f1 white bishop, h1 white rook
- Moves: 1.e4 e5 2.Ne2
- ECO: C20
- Named after: Semyon Alapin
- Parent: Open Game

Alapin's Opening is an unusual chess opening that starts with the moves:

1. e4 e5
2. Ne2

It is named after the Russo-Lithuanian player and openings analyst Semyon Alapin (1856–1923). Although this opening is rarely used, it occurred in Jacobsen–Ljubojević, Groningen 1970, and in Hartoch–Ligterink, Amsterdam 1976.

== Description ==
Alapin's Opening is offbeat, but perfectly playable for White. It is mainly used to avoid highly theoretical lines such as the Ruy Lopez, or to surprise the opponent. White intends to play f2–f4 soon. There is similarity to the Smyslov Position (Smyslov–Botvinnik, 1958) if White tries to play something in the lines of g3, Nbc3, d3, Bg2.

Alapin's Opening also incurs two problems for White. First, the development of White's light-square bishop, and also of White's queen, is blocked, and will require another move of the knight or another pawn move, both of which go against the opening principle to develop the minor pieces quickly. Second, the knight on e2, although flexible, has no control over Black's half of the centre, and will need to be moved again to become more useful.

It is relatively easy for Black to equalise in this opening; for example, 2...Nf6 and 2...Nc6 both equalise, although Black should be careful to avoid being caught by surprise by an eventual f2–f4.

== See also ==
- List of chess openings
- List of chess openings named after people
