= King's Pawn Game =

Chess opening

Position: a8 black rook, b8 black knight, c8 black bishop, d8 black queen, e8 black king, f8 black bishop, g8 black knight, h8 black rook, a7 black pawn, b7 black pawn, c7 black pawn, d7 black pawn, e7 black pawn, f7 black pawn, g7 black pawn, h7 black pawn, e4 white pawn, a2 white pawn, b2 white pawn, c2 white pawn, d2 white pawn, f2 white pawn, g2 white pawn, h2 white pawn, a1 white rook, b1 white knight, c1 white bishop, d1 white queen, e1 white king, f1 white bishop, g1 white knight, h1 white rook
- Moves: 1.e4
- ECO: B00–B99, C00–C99
- Synonyms: e4; King's Pawn Opening

The King's Pawn Game is any chess opening starting with the move:

1. e4

It is the most popular opening move in chess, followed by 1.d4, the Queen's Pawn Game.

== Principles ==
White opens with the most popular of the twenty possible opening moves. Since nearly all openings beginning 1.e4 have names of their own, the term King's Pawn Game, unlike Queen's Pawn Game, is rarely used to describe the opening of the game.

Advancing the king's pawn two squares is highly useful because it occupies a center square, attacks the centre square d5, and allows the development of White's king's bishop and queen. Bobby Fischer said that the King's Pawn Game is "Best by test", and proclaimed that "With 1.e4! I win."

== Opening categorization and continuations ==
King's Pawn Games are further classified by whether Black responds with 1...e5 or not. Openings beginning with 1.e4 e5 are called Double King's Pawn Games, Double King's Pawn Openings, Symmetrical King's Pawn Games, or Open Games – these terms are equivalent. Openings where Black responds to 1.e4 with a move other than 1...e5 are called Asymmetrical King's Pawn Games or Semi-Open Games.

The Encyclopedia of Chess Openings (ECO) classifies all King's Pawn Games into volumes B or C: volume C if the game starts with 1.e4 e6 (the French Defence) or 1.e4 e5; volume B if Black answers 1.e4 with any other move. The rare instances where the opening does not fall into a more specific category than King's Pawn Game are included in codes B00 (includes the Nimzowitsch Defence and unusual moves after 1.e4), C20 (includes Alapin's Opening and unusual moves after 1.e4 e5), and C40 (includes the Latvian Gambit and unusual moves after 1.e4 e5 2.Nf3).

The Black responses which are given one or more chapters in the ECO are given below, ranked in order of popularity according to FIDE-rated games on ChessBase.

=== Common moves ===
The following moves all have at least one ECO code dedicated to them (80 in the case of the two most common moves 1...c5 and 1...e5), and are at least somewhat common in high-level play.

- 1...c5, the Sicilian Defence (B20–B99), is the most common continuation in modern practice. The Sicilian Defence allows Black to fight for the center by preparing to meet a d2–d4 advance with ...cxd4. Black aims to unbalance the game and fight for a win on move one. The many variations include some of the sharpest and most analysed lines in chess.
- 1...e5 leads to the classical Open Games (C20–C99), which includes openings such as the Ruy Lopez, Italian Game, Scotch Game, Petrov Defence, and King's Gambit. In this opening, Black is generally ready to meet a d2–d4 advance with ...exd4, though some variations offer the chance to holding the centre with ...d6.
- 1...e6 is the French Defence (C00–C19). Black's restrained response allows White to play 2.d4. This gives White a spatial advantage, with two pawns in the centre to Black's one (after the usual 2... d5) and open lines for both of the bishops, while Black blocks in the light-squared bishop and stops it from developing. One or the other player will usually resolve the central tension, either by Black playing ...dxe4 or White advancing with e5. In the latter case, Black typically works to undermine White's pawn centre with ...c5 and/or ...f6.
- 1...c6 is the Caro–Kann Defence (B10–B19). Like the French, this is also considered to be a solid reply, but Black will often need to surrender control of the center (e.g., after 2.d4 d5 3.Nc3 Black usually plays 3...dxe4). On the other hand, the light-squared bishop will usually not wind up trapped behind its own pawns, as is common in the French.
- 1...d6 is usually played with the intention of playing the Pirc Defence (1.e4 d6 2.d4 Nf6 3.Nc3 g6, ECO codes B07–B09), a hypermodern defence in which Black allows White to construct a dominant centre, with the intention of subverting it later. It can also lead to the Modern Defence, Pribyl System (3...c6), or Philidor Defence (3...e5, or 4...e5 after 3...Nbd7).
- 1...g6 is the Modern Defence. This is related to the Pirc Defence, to which it can transpose. The Modern Defence is usually defined by the omission of ...Nf6 on Black's part to distinguish it from the Pirc. These openings allow White to build up a pawn centre with 2.d4, but Black will develop the king's bishop to g7 and strike back at the centre. These openings are covered in chapters B06–B09 in ECO, with the Modern covered in chapter B06.
- 1...d5, the Scandinavian Defence (B01) or Center Counter Defence, is a direct strike at the pawn on e4, forcing the situation in the centre. After 2.exd5 Qxd5 3.Nc3, however, White gains time by attacking Black's prematurely developed queen. Alternatively, Black can play 2...Nf6 (the Modern Scandinavian); in reply, White can choose between 3.d4, 3.Bb5+, 3.c4, and 3.Nf3.
- 1...Nf6 is Alekhine's Defence (B02–B05), which invites White to attack the knight with 2.e5. Black is often forced to spend time moving the knight several times as it is chased around the board, all the while allowing White to build up a broad pawn centre. Black counts on the pawns becoming overextended so that they can later be undermined.

=== Rare moves ===
Apart from these eight responses, all other replies from Black are grouped together in ECO chapter B00, though they have little in common except their rarity. A few of these are mentioned in standard opening references such as ECO, MCO, and others, but most are omitted, being considered so weak as to not warrant mention.

- 1...Nc6 is the Nimzowitsch Defence, an example of a hypermodern opening in which Black invites White to occupy the centre of the board at an early stage with pawns. It was frequently played by Tony Miles. After 2.d4, there are two distinctive main lines: 2...e5 and 2...d5. White can also play 2.Nf3, allowing Black to transpose to an Open Game after 1...e5. Black can avoid this but only at the expense of a worse position.
- 1...b6 is Owen's Defence, preparing to develop Black's bishop to b7.
- 1...a6 is the St. George Defence. Black prepares to advance on the queenside with 2...b5, but allows White to occupy the center with 2.d4. The opening gained some attention after Tony Miles used it to defeat Anatoly Karpov in 1980.
- 1...g5, the Borg Defence ("Grob" backwards) often played by Michael Basman; it can also be called the Basman Defence. The move weakens the kingside severely, but according to Modern Chess Openings (MCO), Black is only somewhat worse.
- 1...a5, the Corn Stalk Defence or Ware Defence. United States chess player Preston Ware played the Corn Stalk in eleven recorded tournament games from 1880 to 1882, winning four and losing seven. Its chief fault is the very early and therefore potentially unnecessary development of a peripheral piece.
- 1...b5, the O'Neill Gambit. Black has no real compensation for the sacrificed pawn.
- 1...f5, the Duras Gambit, mentioned in the book Unorthodox Chess Openings. This is a pawn sacrifice which gives Black a lead in development after 2.exf5 Nf6, but without much additional compensation for the sacrificed pawn. Another move in this position is 2...Kf7, dubbed the "Fred", which is considered a joke opening. After 3.Qh5+, Black has to play g6 and ruin their kingside position. The line was played three times in an exhibition match between Ossip Bernstein and Oldřich Duras.
- 1...h5, the Goldsmith Defence or Pickering Defence, wastes a tempo and weakens the kingside. It is the reversed version of the Kádas Opening.
- 1...f6, the Barnes Defence, named after Thomas Wilson Barnes, is clearly inferior, taking away the f6-square from the knight and weakening Black's kingside, although Barnes managed to defeat Paul Morphy with this defence in 1858.
- 1...h6, the Carr Defence, mentioned in Unorthodox Chess Openings. It has also been used by Michael Basman and Magnus Carlsen. It is likely to transpose to the Borg Defence after 2.d4 g5.
- 1...Na6, the Lemming Defence (according to Unorthodox Chess Openings), develops the knight to an inferior square.
- 1...Nh6, the Adams Defence or Wild Bull Defence

== See also ==
- List of chess openings
- Open Game
- Semi-Open Game
