= Fianchetto =

Chess pattern of development

Position: a8 black rook, b8 black knight, d8 black queen, e8 black king, f8 black bishop, g8 black knight, h8 black rook, a7 black pawn, b7 black bishop, c7 black pawn, d7 black pawn, e7 black pawn, f7 black pawn, g7 black pawn, h7 black pawn, b5 black pawn, a3 white bishop, b3 white pawn, g3 white pawn, a2 white pawn, c2 white pawn, d2 white pawn, e2 white pawn, f2 white pawn, g2 white bishop, h2 white pawn, a1 white rook, b1 white knight, d1 white queen, e1 white king, g1 white knight, h1 white rook

Fianchettoed bishops

In chess, the fianchetto (English: /ˌfiː.ən.ˈkɛ.toʊ/ or spelling pronunciation /ˌfiː.ən.ˈtʃɛ.toʊ/; Italian: [fjaŋˈketto] "little flank") is a pattern of development wherein a bishop is developed to the second rank of the adjacent b- or g-file, the knight pawn having been moved one or two squares forward.

The fianchetto is a staple of many "hypermodern" openings, whose philosophy is to delay direct occupation of the centre with the plan of undermining and destroying the opponent's occupied centre. It also regularly occurs in Indian defences. The fianchetto is less common in Open Games (1.e4 e5), but the king bishop is sometimes fianchettoed by Black in the Ruy Lopez or by White in an uncommon variation of the Vienna Game.

One of the major benefits of the fianchetto is that it often allows the fianchettoed bishop to become more active. A fianchettoed position, however, also presents some opportunities for the opponent: if the fianchettoed bishop can be exchanged, the squares the bishop was formerly protecting will become weak (see hole) and can form the basis of an attack (particularly if the fianchetto was performed on the kingside).

== Concept ==
The diagram shows three different sorts of fianchetti (not from an actual game, but as examples collapsed into a single diagram). White's king bishop is in a regular fianchetto, with the knight pawn advanced one square and the bishop occupying the long diagonal. This is by far the most common type of fianchetto, seen in the Sicilian Dragon, Pirc Defence, Modern Defence, Modern Benoni, Grünfeld Defence, Nimzo-Indian, and King's Indian Defence, among other openings. The regular fianchetto of both bishops by a player is called a double fianchetto.

Black's queen bishop is also fianchettoed, but the knight pawn has moved forward two squares, making this a long fianchetto. The b-pawn also controls the c4-square, which is often advantageous. If White plays the King's Indian Attack 1.Nf3 2.g3, Black may play a long queenside fianchetto to oppose White's bishop and make it more difficult for White to play a c4 pawn break. A long fianchetto on the kingside is more rarely played, because it weakens the pawn shield in front of the castled position and controls a less important square. Nevertheless, Grob's Attack 1.g4 and the Borg Defence ("Grob" backwards) 1.e4 g5?! are sometimes played by players such as IM Michael Basman.

White's queen bishop has moved to a3 in what is sometimes called an extended fianchetto. Rather than control the long diagonal, it takes aim at Black's f8-square. If Black moves his e-pawn, White can play Bxf8, after which Black will have to waste time on artificial castling after recapturing with his king. This tactic is often seen in the Evans Gambit and gives the Benko Gambit much of its bite. Black often plays ...Ba6 in the French Defence, and in the Queen's Indian Defence if White plays g3 in order to fianchetto his own bishop (Aron Nimzowitsch's move against the classical main line).

== Four fianchettoed bishops ==
Rubinstein vs. Nimzowitsch, 1925

Position: a8 black rook, b8 black knight, d8 black queen, e8 black king, h8 black rook, a7 black pawn, b7 black bishop, d7 black pawn, e7 black pawn, f7 black pawn, g7 black bishop, h7 black pawn, f6 black knight, g6 black pawn, c5 black pawn, c4 white pawn, b3 white pawn, f3 white knight, g3 white pawn, a2 white pawn, b2 white bishop, e2 white pawn, f2 white pawn, g2 white bishop, h2 white pawn, a1 white rook, b1 white knight, d1 white queen, e1 white king, h1 white rook

Position after 8.Bb2

The game Rubinstein–Nimzowitsch, Marienbad 1925, had four fianchettoed bishops, two developed knights, and two on their home squares. In this position, Nimzowitsch humorously pointed out in My System: "Each side castles now with a clear conscience, for not even the most hypermodern pair of masters can produce more than four fianchettoed Bishops!"
