= Zukertort Opening =

Chess opening

Position: a8 black rook, b8 black knight, c8 black bishop, d8 black queen, e8 black king, f8 black bishop, g8 black knight, h8 black rook, a7 black pawn, b7 black pawn, c7 black pawn, d7 black pawn, e7 black pawn, f7 black pawn, g7 black pawn, h7 black pawn, f3 white knight, a2 white pawn, b2 white pawn, c2 white pawn, d2 white pawn, e2 white pawn, f2 white pawn, g2 white pawn, h2 white pawn, a1 white rook, b1 white knight, c1 white bishop, d1 white queen, e1 white king, f1 white bishop, h1 white rook
- Moves: 1.Nf3
- ECO: A04–A09
- Named after: Johannes Zukertort

The Zukertort Opening is a chess opening named after Johannes Zukertort that begins with the move:

1. Nf3

A flank opening, it is the third most popular of the twenty legal opening moves White has, behind only 1.e4 and 1.d4. Sometimes the name "Réti Opening" is used for the opening move 1.Nf3, although most sources define the Réti more narrowly as the sequence 1.Nf3 d5 2.c4, which happens to be the most common independent variation of the Zukertort. By playing 1.Nf3, White prevents Black from playing 1...e5, and keeps future move options open. It has been described by Edmar Mednis as a "perfect and flexible opening" and by others such as Aron Nimzowitsch as "certainly the most solid move, whereas moves such as 1.e4 and 1.d4 are both 'committal' and 'compromising'."

The opening is very often used as a transpositional device into openings that usually start with 1.e4, 1.d4, or 1.c4, where White delays certain committal moves until having more knowledge of Black's plans, usually with the goal of avoiding certain lines possible with a different move order. For example, after 1.Nf3 c5, White can play 2.e4, leading to the mainline Sicilian Defense, or alternatively 2.c4, leading to the Symmetrical Variation of the English Opening. The most common transpositions are to the Queen's Gambit Declined (after e.g. 1.Nf3 d5 2.d4 Nf6 3.c4), the Catalan Opening (after e.g. 1.Nf3 Nf6 2.g3 d5 3.Bg2 e6 4.0-0 Be7 5.c4), and the English.

The main independent lines that usually start with 1.Nf3 are the Réti Opening (1.Nf3 d5 2.c4), the King's Indian Attack (where White plays g3, Bg2, e4, d3, and 0-0), and the Nimzowitsch–Larsen Attack (where White plays b3, Bb2, and e3). In these lines, White allows Black to control the center, intending to later undermine that control, in hypermodern style.

== Continuations ==
Common Black responses are given below, ranked in order of popularity.

=== 1...Nf6 ===
Like White's move, Black's move is non-committal as to opening. 2.d4 is identical to 1.d4 Nf6 2.Nf3 (see Queen's Pawn Game). 2.c4 is a common start for the English Opening or it may be brought back to the Queen's Gambit Declined. 2.g3 is a common start for the King's Indian Attack.

=== 1...d5 ===
Black stakes a claim to the center. White has many transpositional options, such as:

- 2.d4, again the same as 1.d4 d5 2.Nf3 (see Queen's Pawn Game);
- 2.g3, the King's Indian Attack;
- 2.c4, the Réti Opening or English Opening;
- 2.e4, the Tennison Gambit.

=== 1...c5 ===
Black invites White to play 2.e4, transitioning into the Sicilian Defense, or 2.c4, the Symmetrical Defense of the English Opening.

=== 1...g6 ===
White can play 2.c4 for the English Opening, 2.e4 for the Sicilian Defense, 2.g3 for the King's Indian Attack, or 2.d4 for the King's Indian Defense.

=== 1...e6 ===
Like White's move, Black's move is non-committal as to opening. White can play 2.c4 for the English Opening or 2.e4 for the French Defense (if Black plays 2...d5) or the Sicilian Defense (if Black plays 2...c5). Another non-committal move for White is 2.d4, which can lead to the Sicilian Defense, the Queen's Gambit Declined, the Dutch Defense, the Indian Defenses, the King's Indian Attack, or the London System, depending on Black's reply.

=== 1...f5 ===
After 1...f5, 2.d4 is the Dutch Defense. 2.e4 borrows ideas from the Staunton Gambit.

== ECO Codes ==
The Encyclopaedia of Chess Openings classifies the Queen's Indian under codes A04 to A09 according to the below scheme.

- A04: 1.Nf3
- A05: 1.Nf3 Nf6
- A06: 1.Nf3 d5
- A07: 1.Nf3 d5 2.g3 (King's Indian Attack)
- A08: 1.Nf3 d5 2.g3 c5
- A09: 1.Nf3 d5 2.c4 (Réti Opening)

== See also ==
- List of chess openings
- List of chess openings named after people
