= Abonyi =

Abonyi is a surname. Notable people with the surname include:

- Attila Abonyi (1946–2023), Hungarian-born Australian footballer and manager
- István Abonyi (1886–1942), Hungarian chess master

== See also ==
- Abony, town in Hungary
