= NF3 =

NF3 may refer to:

- Nitrogen trifluoride (NF_{3}), a colorless gas used as an etchant
- Zukertort Opening, an opening move in chess (1. Nf3)
