= List of chess gambits =

This is a list of chess openings that are gambits. The gambits are organized into sections by the parent chess opening, giving the gambit name, ECO code, and defining moves in algebraic chess notation.

== Alekhine's Defense ==
- Alekhine Gambit – B02 – 1.e4 Nf6 2.e5 Nd5 3.c4 Nb6 4.d4 d6 5.Nf3 Bg4 6.Be2 dxe5 7.Nxe5
- John Tracy Gambit – B02 – 1.e4 Nf6 2.Nf3
- Krejcik Gambit – B02 – 1.e4 Nf6 2.Bc4 Nxe4 3.Bxf7+
- Buntin Gambit – B02 – 1.e4 Nf6 2.e5 Nd5 3.e6
- Geschev Gambit – B02 – 1.e4 Nf6 2.Nc3 d5 3.exd5 c6
- O'Sullivan Gambit – B03 – 1.e4 Nf6 2.e5 Nd5 3.d4 b5
- Myers Gambit – B02 – 1.e4 Nf6 2.Nc3 d5 3.d3 dxe4 4.Bg5
- Spielmann Gambit – B02 – 1.e4 Nf6 2.Nc3 d5 3.e5 Nfd7 4.e6
- Cambridge Gambit – B03 – 1.e4 Nf6 2.e5 Nd5 3.d4 d6 4.c4 Nb6 5.f4 g5
- Lasker Simul Gambit – B02 – 1.e4 Nf6 2.e5 Nd5 3.c4 Nb6 4.c5 Nd5 5.Nc3 e6 6.Bc4
- Matsukevich Gambit – B02 – 1.e4 Nf6 2.e5 Nd5 3.c4 Nb6 4.c5 Nd5 5.Nc3 Nxc3 6.dxc3 d6 7.Bg5
- Mikėnas Gambit – B02 – 1.e4 Nf6 2.e5 Nd5 3.c4 Nb6 4.c5 Nd5 5.Bc4 e6 6.Nc3 d6 7.Nxd5 exd5 8.Bxd5

== Bird's Opening ==
- From's Gambit – A02 – 1.f4 e5
- Swiss Gambit – A02 – 1.f4 f5 2.e4 fxe4 3.Nc3 Nf6 4.g4
- Williams Gambit – A03 – 1.f4 d5 2.e4
- Hobbs Gambit – A02 – 1.f4 g5
- Bahr Gambit – A02 – 1.f4 e5 2.Nc3
- Sturm Gambit – A02 – 1.f4 d5 2.c4
- Wagner–Zwitersch Gambit – A02 – 1.f4 f5 2.e4 fxe4 3.Nc3 Nf6 4.g4
- Lasker Gambit – A02 – 1.f4 e5 2.fxe5 f6
- Platz Gambit – A02 – 1.f4 e5 2.fxe5 Ne7
- Schlechter Gambit – A02 – 1.f4 e5 2.fxe5 Nc6
- Batavo Gambit – A02 – 1.f4 d5 2.Nf3 c5 3.e4 dxe4
- Langheld Gambit – A02 – 1.f4 e5 2.fxe5 d6 3.exd6 Nf6
- Siegener Gambit – A02 – 1.f4 e5 2.d4 exd4 3.Nf3 c5 4.c3
- Thomas Gambit – A02 – 1.f4 d5 2.b3 Nf6 3.Bb2 d4 4.Nf3 c5 5.e3
- Prokofiev Gambit – A03 – 1.f4 d5 2.e4 dxe4 3.d3

== Bishop's Opening ==
- Calabrian Countergambit – C23 – 1.e4 e5 2.Bc4 f5
- Boden–Kieseritzky Gambit – C24 – 1.e4 e5 2.Bc4 Nf6 3.Nf3 Nxe4 4.Nc3
- Greco Gambit – C24 – 1.e4 e5 2.Bc4 Nf6 3.f4
- Ponziani Gambit – C24 – 1.e4 e5 2.Bc4 Nf6 3.d4
- Urusov Gambit – C24 – 1.e4 e5 2.Bc4 Nf6 3.d4 exd4 4.Nf3
- Khan Gambit – C23 – 1.e4 e5 2.Bc4 d5
- Keidansky Gambit – C23 – 1.e4 e5 2.Bc4 Nf6 3.d4 exd4 4.Nf3 Nxe4 5.Qxd4
- Lewis Gambit – C23 – 1.e4 e5 2.Bc4 Bc5 3.d4
- Stein Gambit – C23 – 1.e4 e5 2.Bc4 Bc5 3.f4
- Anderssen Gambit – C23 – 1.e4 e5 2.Bc4 b5 3.Bxb5 c6
- Thorold Gambit – C23 – 1.e4 e5 2.Bc4 b5 3.Bxb5 f5
- Wing Gambit – C23 – 1.e4 e5 2.Bc4 Bc5 3.b4
- Four Pawns Gambit – C23 – 1.e4 e5 2.Bc4 Bc5 3.b4 Bxb4 4.f4 exf4 5.Nf3 Be7 6.d4 Bh4+ 7.g3 fxg3 8.0-0 gxh2+ 9.Kh1
- Lewis Countergambit – C23 – 1.e4 e5 2.Bc4 Bc5 3.c3 d5
- McDonnell Double Gambit – C23 – 1.e4 e5 2.Bc4 Bc5 3.b4 Bxb4 4.f4
- La Bourdonnais–Denker Gambit – C23 – 1.e4 e5 2.Bc4 Bc5 3.b4 Bxb4 4.c3
- Lopez Gambit – C23 – 1.e4 e5 2.Bc4 Bc5 3.Qe2 Nf6 4.f4

== Blackmar–Diemer Gambit ==
- Blackmar Gambit – D00 – 1.d4 d5 2.e4 dxe4 3.f3
- Blackmar–Diemer Gambit – D00 – 1.d4 d5 2.e4 dxe4 3.Nc3 Nf6 4.f3 – also 1.d4 d5 2.Nc3 Nf6 3.e4 dxe4 4.f3
- Lemberger Countergambit – D00 – 1.d4 d5 2.e4 dxe4 3.Nc3 e5
- Rasa-Studier Gambit – D00 – 1.d4 d5 2.e4 dxe4 3.Nc3 Nf6 4.Be3
- Von Popiel Gambit – D00 – 1.d4 d5 2.e4 dxe4 3.Nc3 Nf6 4.Bg5
- Brombacher Countergambit – D00 – 1.d4 d5 2.e4 dxe4 3.Nc3 Nf6 4.f3 c5
- Elbert Countergambit – D00 – 1.d4 d5 2.e4 dxe4 3.Nc3 Nf6 4.f3 e5
- Ryder Gambit – D00 – 1.d4 d5 2.e4 dxe4 3.Nc3 Nf6 4.f3 exf3 5.Qxf3
- Pfrang Gambit – D00 – 1.d4 d5 2.e4 dxe4 3.Nc3 Nf6 4.f3 e6 5.fxe4
- Duthilleul Gambit – D00 – 1.d4 d5 2.e4 dxe4 3.Nc3 Nf6 4.f3 exf3 5.Nxf3 e6 6.Bd3
- Tejler Gambit – D00 – 1.d4 d5 2.e4 dxe4 3.Nc3 Nf6 4.f3 exf3 5.Qxf3 Qxd4 6.Be3 Qg4

== Caro–Kann Defense ==
- Mieses Gambit – B12 – 1.e4 c6 2.d4 d5 3.Be3
- Alien Gambit – B15 – 1.e4 c6 2.d4 d5 3.Nc3 dxe4 4.Nxe4 Nf6 5.Ng5 h6 6.Nxf7
- Martian Gambit – B15 – 1.e4 c6 2.d4 d5 3.Nc3 dxe4 4.Nxe4 Bf5 5.Ng5 Bg6 6.N1f3 h6 7.Ne6
- Hector Gambit – B12 – 1.e4 c6 2.Nc3 d5 3.Nf3 dxe4 4.Ng5
- Schaeffer Gambit – B10 – 1.e4 c6 2.Bc4 d5 3.Bb3 dxe4 4.Qh5
- Ulysses Gambit – B12 – 1.e4 c6 2.d4 d5 3.Nf3 dxe4 4.Ng5
- Von Hennig Gambit – B15 – 1.e4 c6 2.d4 d5 3.Nc3 dxe4 4.Bc4
- Alekhine Gambit – B15 – 1.e4 c6 2.d4 d5 3.Nc3 dxe4 4.Nxe4 Nf6 5.Bd3
- Maróczy Gambit – B12 – 1.e4 c6 2.d4 d5 3.f3 dxe4 4.fxe4 e5 5.Nf3 exd4 6.Bc4
- Fianchetto Gambit – B13 – 1.e4 c6 2.d4 d5 3.exd5 cxd5 4.c4 Nf6 5.Nc3 g6 6.cxd5 Bg7
- Rasa–Studier Gambit – B15 – 1.e4 c6 2.d4 d5 3.Nc3 dxe4 4.f3

== Center Game ==
- Danish Gambit – C21 – 1.e4 e5 2.d4 exd4 3.c3

== English Opening ==
- Jaenisch Gambit – A10 – 1.c4 b5
- Achilles-Omega Gambit – A10 – 1.c4 Nf6 2.e4
- Hickmann Gambit – A10 – 1.c4 f5 2.e4
- Wade Gambit – A10 – 1.c4 f5 2.g4
- Wing Gambit – A30 – 1.c4 c5 2.b4
- Loehn Gambit – A10 – 1.c4 d5 2.cxd5 e6
- Schulz Gambit – A10 – 1.c4 d5 2.cxd5 Nf6
- Chabanon Gambit – A10 – 1.c4 f5 2.Nf3 d6 3.e4
- Ferenc Gambit – A10 – 1.c4 f5 2.Nc3 Nf6 3.e4
- Napolitano Gambit – A30 – 1.c4 c5 2.Nf3 Nf6 3.b4
- Kahiko–Hula Gambit – A20 – 1.c4 e5 2.e3 Nf6 3.f4 exf4 4.Nf3
- Nei Gambit – A19 – 1.c4 Nf6 2.Nc3 e6 3.e4 c5 4.e5 Ng8
- Romanishin Gambit – A13 – 1.c4 Nf6 2.Nf3 e6 3.g3 a6 4.Bg2 b5
- Bellón Gambit – A22 – 1.c4 e5 2.Nc3 Nf6 3.Nf3 e4 4.Ng5 b5

== French Defense ==
- Bäuerle Gambit – C01 – 1.e4 e6 2.d4 b5
- Alapin Gambit – C00 – 1.e4 e6 2.d4 d5 3.Be3
- Papa-Ticulat Gambit – C00 – 1.e4 e6 2.b3 d5 3.Bb2
- Perseus Gambit – C01 – 1.e4 e6 2.d4 d5 3.Nf3
- Diemer–Duhm Gambit – C00 – 1.e4 e6 2.d4 d5 3.c4
- Frenkel Gambit – C02 – 1.e4 e6 2.d4 d5 3.e5 c5 4.b4
- Orthoschnapp Gambit – C00 – 1.e4 e6 2.c4 d5 3.cxd5 exd5 4.Qb3
- Alekhine–Maróczy Gambit – C15 – 1.e4 e6 2.d4 d5 3.Nc3 Bb4 4.Ne2
- Winckelmann–Riemer Gambit – C15 – 1.e4 e6 2.d4 d5 3.Nc3 Bb4 4.a3
- Wing Gambit – C00 – 1.e4 e6 2.Nf3 d5 3.e5 c5 4.b4
- Ellis Gambit – C10 – 1.e4 e6 2.d4 d5 3.Nc3 dxe4 4.Nxe4 e5
- Shaposhnikov Gambit – C07 – 1.e4 e6 2.d4 d5 3.Nd2 c5 4.exd5 Nf6
- Nimzowitsch Gambit – C02 – 1.e4 e6 2.d4 d5 3.e5 c5 4.Qg4
- Ruisdonk Gambit – C02 – 1.e4 e6 2.d4 d5 3.e5 c5 4.Nf3 cxd4 5.Bd3
- Wolf Gambit – C12 – 1.e4 e6 2.d4 d5 3.Nc3 Nf6 4.Bg5 Bb4 5.Ne2
- Kunin Double Gambit – C15 – 1.e4 e6 2.d4 d5 3.Nc3 Bb4 4.Bd2 dxe4 5.Qg4 Qxd4
- Milner-Barry Gambit – C02 – 1.e4 e6 2.d4 d5 3.e5 c5 4.c3 Nc6 5.Nf3 Qb6 6.Bd3
- Albin–Chatard Gambit – C13 – 1.e4 e6 2.d4 d5 3.Nc3 Nf6 4.Bg5 Be7 5.e5 Nfd7 6.h4 Bxg5 7.hxg5 Qxg5

== Grob's Attack ==
- Basman Gambit – A00 – 1.g4 d5 2.Bg2 h5 3.gxh5
- Fritz Gambit – A00 – 1.g4 d5 2.Bg2 Bxg4 3.c4
- Romford Countergambit – A00 – 1.g4 d5 2.Bg2 Bxg4 3.c4 d4

== Indian Defense ==
- Benko Gambit (Volga Gambit) – A57 – 1.d4 Nf6 2.c4 c5 3.d5 b5
- Hjoerring Countergambit – A57 – 1.d4 Nf6 2.c4 c5 3.d5 b5 4.e4
- Mutkin Countergambit – A57 – 1.d4 Nf6 2.c4 c5 3.d5 b5 4.g4
- Blumenfeld Countergambit – E10 – 1.d4 Nf6 2.c4 e6 3.Nf3 c5 4.d5 b5
- Devin Gambit – A50 – 1.d4 Nf6 2.c4 e6 3.g4
- Omega Gambit – A45 – 1.d4 Nf6 2.e4
- Budapest Gambit – A51 – 1.d4 Nf6 2.c4 e5
- Lazard Gambit – A45 – 1.d4 Nf6 2.Nd2 e5
- Maddigan Gambit – A45 – 1.d4 Nf6 2.Nc3 e5
- Medusa Gambit – A50 – 1.d4 Nf6 2.c4 g5
- Pyrenees Gambit – A50 – 1.d4 Nf6 2.c4 b5
- Adorjan Gambit – A60 – 1.d4 Nf6 2.c4 g6 3.d5 b5
- Leko Gambit – A70 – 1.d4 Nf6 2.c4 g6 3.f3 e5
- Schnepper Gambit – A47 – 1.d4 Nf6 2.Nf3 b6 3.c3 e5
- Arafat Gambit – A45 – 1.d4 Nf6 2.e4 Nxe4 3.Bd3 Nf6 4.Bg5
- Stummer Gambit – A45 – 1.d4 Nf6 2.g4 Nxg4 3.e4 d6 4.Be2 Nf6 5.Nc3

== Italian Game ==
- Lucchini Gambit – C50 – 1.e4 e5 2.Nf3 Nc6 3.Bc4 Bc5 4.d3 f5
- Nakhmanson Gambit – C56 – 1.e4 e5 2.Nf3 Nc6 3.Bc4 Nf6 4.d4 exd4 5.0-0 Nxe4 6.Nc3
- Evans Gambit – C57 – 1.e4 e5 2.Nf3 Nc6 3.Bc4 Bc5 4.b4
- Fried Liver Attack – C57 – 1.e4 e5 2.Nf3 Nc6 3.Bc4 Nf6 4.Ng5 d5 5.exd5 Nxd5 6.Nxf7
- Rousseau Gambit – C50 – 1.e4 e5 2.Nf3 Nc6 3.Bc4 f5
- Blackburne Shilling Gambit – C50 – 1.e4 e5 2.Nf3 Nc6 3.Bc4 Nd4
- Jerome Gambit – C50 – 1.e4 e5 2.Nf3 Nc6 3.Bc4 Bc5 4.Bxf7+
- Italian Gambit – C50 –1.e4 e5 2.Nf3 Nc6 3.Bc4 Bc5 4.d4
- Neumann Gambit – C55 – 1.e4 e5 2.Nf3 Nc6 3.c3 Nf6 4.Bc4
- Alexandre Gambit – C55 – 1.e4 e5 2.Nf3 Nc6 3.Bc4 Bc5 4.c3 f5
- Hein Countergambit – C51 – 1.e4 e5 2.Nf3 Nc6 3.Bc4 Bc5 4.b4 d5
- Ponziani–Steinitz Gambit – C57 – 1.e4 e5 2.Nf3 Nc6 3.Bc4 Nf6 4.Ng5 Nxe4
- Traxler Counterattack – C57 – 1.e4 e5 2.Nf3 Nc6 3.Bc4 Nf6 4.Ng5 Bc5
- Albin Gambit – C53 – 1.e4 e5 2.Nf3 Nc6 3.Bc4 Bc5 4.c3 Nf6 5.0-0
- Deutz Gambit – C55 – 1.e4 e5 2.Nf3 Nc6 3.Bc4 Bc5 4.0-0 Nf6 5.d4
- Kloss Gambit – C57 – 1.e4 e5 2.Nf3 Nc6 3.Bc4 Nf6 4.Ng5 d5 5.exd5 Nb4
- Walbrodt–Baird Gambit – C54 – 1.e4 e5 2.Nf3 Nc6 3.Bc4 Bc5 4.c3 Nf6 5.d4 exd4 6.0-0
- Leonhardt Countergambit – C52 – 1.e4 e5 2.Nf3 Nc6 3.Bc4 Bc5 4.b4 Bxb4 5.c3 Ba5 6.d4 b5

== King's Gambit ==
- Falkbeer Countergambit – C31 – 1.e4 e5 2.f4 d5
- Panteldakis Countergambit – C30 – 1.e4 e5 2.f4 f5
- Basman Gambit – C33 – 1.e4 e5 2.f4 exf4 3.Qe2
- Bishop's Gambit – C33 – 1.e4 e5 2.f4 exf4 3.Bc4
- Breyer Gambit – C33 – 1.e4 e5 2.f4 exf4 3.Qf3
- Gama Gambit – C33 – 1.e4 e5 2.f4 exf4 3.g3
- King's Knight Gambit – C34 – 1.e4 e5 2.f4 exf4 3.Nf3
- Mason–Keres Gambit – C33 – 1.e4 e5 2.f4 exf4 3.Nc3
- Orsini Gambit – C33 – 1.e4 e5 2.f4 exf4 3.b3
- Paris Gambit – C33 – 1.e4 e5 2.f4 exf4 3.Ne2
- Villemson Gambit – C33 – 1.e4 e5 2.f4 exf4 3.d4
- Schurig Gambit – C33 – 1.e4 e5 2.f4 exf4 3.Bb5
- Stamma Gambit – C33 – 1.e4 e5 2.f4 exf4 3.h4
- Tartakower Gambit – C33 – 1.e4 e5 2.f4 exf4 3.Be2
- Hinrichsen Gambit – C31 – 1.e4 e5 2.f4 d5 3.d4
- Schurig Gambit – C33 – 1.e4 e5 2.f4 exf4 3.Bb5
- Gianutio Gambit – C33 – 1.e4 e5 2.f4 exf4 3.Bc4 f5
- Bishop Gambit, Kieseritzky Gambit – C33 – 1.e4 e5 2.f4 exf4 3.Bc4 b5
- Gianutio Countergambit – C34 – 1.e4 e5 2.f4 exf4 3.Nf3 f5
- Miles Gambit – C31 – 1.e4 e5 2.f4 d5 3.exd5 Bc5
- Nimzowitsch–Marshall Countergambit – C31 – 1.e4 e5 2.f4 d5 3.exd5 c6
- Quaade Gambit – C37 – 1.e4 e5 2.f4 exf4 3.Nf3 g5 4.Nc3
- Rosentreter Gambit – C37 – 1.e4 e5 2.f4 exf4 3.Nf3 g5 4.d4 g4
- Rotlewi Countergambit – C30 – 1.e4 e5 2.f4 Bc5 3.Nf3 d6 4.b4
- Charousek Gambit – C31 – 1.e4 e5 2.f4 d5 3.exd5 e4 4.d3
- Bledow Countergambit – C33 – 1.e4 e5 2.f4 exf4 3.Bc4 d5 4.Bxd5 Nf6
- Bryan Countergambit – C33 – 1.e4 e5 2.f4 exf4 3.Bc4 Qh4+ 4.Kf1 b5
- Blachly Gambit – C37 – 1.e4 e5 2.f4 exf4 3.Nf3 g5 4.Bc4 Nc6
- Pickler Gambit – C31 – 1.e4 e5 2.f4 d5 3.exd5 c6 4.dxc6 Bc5
- Allgaier Gambit – C39 – 1.e4 e5 2.f4 exf4 3.Nf3 g5 4.h4 g4 5.Ng5
- Hanstein Gambit – C39 – 1.e4 e5 2.f4 exf4 3.Nf3 g5 4.Bc4 Bg7 5.0-0
- Lolli Gambit – C37 – 1.e4 e5 2.f4 exf4 3.Nf3 g5 4.Bc4 g4 5.Bxf7+
- McDonnell Gambit – C37 – 1.e4 e5 2.f4 exf4 3.Nf3 g5 4.Bc4 g4 5.Nc3
- Muzio Gambit – C37 – 1.e4 e5 2.f4 exf4 3.Nf3 g5 4.Bc4 g4 5.0-0
- Philidor Gambit – C38 – 1.e4 e5 2.f4 exf4 3.Nf3 g5 4.Bc4 Bg7 5.h4
- Sørensen Gambit – C37 – 1.e4 e5 2.f4 exf4 3.Nf3 g5 4.d4 g4 5.Nc3 Sørensen Gambit
- Salvio Gambit – C37 – 1.e4 e5 2.f4 exf4 3.Nf3 g5 4.Bc4 g4 5.Ne5
- Charousek Gambit – C32 – 1.e4 e5 2.f4 d5 3.exd5 e4 4.d3
- Bertin Gambit – C35 – 1.e4 e5 2.f4 exf4 3.Nf3 Be7 4.Bc4 Bh4+ 5.g3
- Ghulam Kassim Gambit – C37 – 1.e4 e5 2.f4 exf4 3.Nf3 g5 4.Bc4 g4 5.d4
- Kieseritzky Gambit – C39 – 1.e4 e5 2.f4 exf4 3.Nf3 g5 4.h4 g4 5.Ne5
- Greco Gambit – C38 – 1.e4 e5 2.f4 exf4 3.Nf3 g5 4.Bc4 Bg7 5.h4 h6 6.d4 d6
- Rice Gambit – C39 – 1.e4 e5 2.f4 exf4 3.Nf3 g5 4.h4 g4 5.Ne5 Nf6 6.Bc4 d5 7.exd5 Bd6 8.0-0
- Silberschmidt Gambit – C37 – 1.e4 e5 2.f4 exf4 3.Nf3 g5 4.Bc4 g4 5.Ne5 Qh4+ 6.Kf1 Nh6 7.d4 f3
- Blackburne Gambit – C37 – 1.e4 e5 2.f4 exf4 3.Nf3 g5 4.h4 g4 5.Ng5 h6 6.Nxf7 Kxf7 7.Nc3
- Bello Gambit – C37 – 1.e4 e5 2.f4 exf4 3.Nf3 g5 4.Bc4 g4 5.0-0 gxf3 6.Qxf3 Qf6 7.Nc3
- Cochrane Gambit – C37 – 1.e4 e5 2.f4 exf4 3.Nf3 g5 4.Bc4 g4 5.Ne5 Qh4+ 6.Kf1 f3
- Bird Gambit – C37 – 1.e4 e5 2.f4 exf4 3.Nf3 g5 4.d4 g4 5.Ne5 Qh4+ 6.g3
- Mayet Gambit – C38 – 1.e4 e5 2.f4 exf4 3.Nf3 g5 4.Bc4 Bg7 5.d4 d6 6.c3
- Cotter Gambit – C39 – 1.e4 e5 2.f4 exf4 3.Nf3 g5 4.h4 g4 5.Ne5 h6 6.Nxf7

== Philidor Defense ==
- Lopez Countergambit – C41 – 1.e4 e5 2.Nf3 d6 3.Bc4 f5
- Philidor Countergambit – C41 – 1.e4 e5 2.Nf3 d6 3.d4 f5
- Bird Gambit – C41 – 1.e4 e5 2.Nf3 d6 3.d4 exd4 4.c3
- Morphy Gambit – C41 – 1.e4 e5 2.Nf3 d6 3.d4 exd4 4.Bc4
- Albin–Blackburne Gambit – C41 – 1.e4 e5 2.Nf3 d6 3.d4 Bg4 4.dxe5 Nd7
- Shirov Gambit – C41 – 1.e4 e5 2.Nf3 d6 3.d4 Nd7 4.Nc3 Ngf6 5.g4

== Queen's Gambit ==
- Albin Countergambit – D08 – 1.d4 d5 2.c4 e5
- Diemer Gambit – D10 – 1.d4 d5 2.c4 c6 3.e4
- Slav Gambit – D21 – 1.d4 d5 2.c4 dxc4 3.Nf3 b5
- Salvio Countergambit – D06 – 1.d4 d5 2.c4 c5 3.dxc5 d4
- Lazard Gambit – D07 – 1.d4 d5 2.c4 Nc6 3.Nf3 e5
- Tartakower Gambit – D07 – 1.d4 d5 2.c4 Nc6 3.Nc3 e5
- Tan Gambit – D07 – 1.d4 d5 2.c4 Nf6 3.cxd5 c6
- Winawer Countergambit – D10 – 1.d4 d5 2.c4 c6 3.Nc3 e5
- Somov Gambit – D20 – 1.d4 d5 2.c4 dxc4 3.e4 e5 4.Bxc4
- Semi-Slav Marshall Gambit – D31 – 1.d4 d5 2.c4 e6 3.Nc3 c6 4.e4
- Bonet Gambit – D11 – 1.d4 d5 2.c4 c6 3.Nf3 Nf6 4.Bg5
- Schara Gambit – D31 – 1.d4 d5 2.c4 e6 3.Nc3 c5 4.cxd5 cxd4
- Miladinović Gambit – D31 – 1.d4 d5 2.c4 e6 3.Nc3 Be7 4.e4 dxe4 5.f3
- Portisch Gambit – D31 – 1.d4 d5 2.c4 e6 3.Nc3 c6 4.e3 f5 5.g4
- Geller Gambit – D15 – 1.d4 d5 2.c4 c6 3.Nf3 Nf6 4.Nc3 dxc4 5.e4
- Tarrasch Defense Marshall Gambit – D32 – 1.d4 d5 2.c4 e6 3.Nc3 c5 4.cxd5 exd5 5.e4
- Argentinian Gambit – D06 – 1.d4 d5 2.c4 Bf5 3.cxd5 Bxb1 4.Qa4+ c6 5.dxc6 Nxc6
- Billinger Gambit – D20 – 1.d4 d5 2.c4 dxc4 3.e3 e5 4.Bxc4 exd4 5.Qb3 Qe7 6.a3
- Christensen Gambit – D20 – 1.d4 d5 2.c4 dxc4 3.e3 e5 4.Bxc4 exd4 5.Qb3 Qe7 6.Nf3
- Korchnoi Gambit – D20 – 1.d4 d5 2.c4 dxc4 3.e3 e5 4.Bxc4 exd4 5.Qb3 Qe7 6.Kf1
- Novikov Gambit – D20 – 1.d4 d5 2.c4 dxc4 3.e3 e5 4.Bxc4 exd4 5.Qb3 Qe7 6.Nd2
- Alekhine Gambit – D37 – 1.d4 d5 2.c4 e6 3.Nc3 Nf6 4.Bg5 Nbd7 5.Nf3 h6 6.Bh4 dxc4
- Tarrasch Gambit – D32 – 1.d4 d5 2.c4 e6 3.Nc3 c5 4.cxd5 exd5 5.dxc5 d4 6.Na4 b5
- Fazekas Gambit – D17 – 1.d4 d5 2.c4 c6 3.Nf3 Nf6 4.Nc3 dxc4 5.a4 Bf5 6.Ne5 Na6 7.e4
- Grünfeld Gambit – D32 – 1.d4 d5 2.c4 e6 3.Nc3 c5 4.cxd5 exd5 5.Nf3 Nc6 6.dxc5 d4 7.Na4 b5
- Von Hennig Gambit – D32 – 1.d4 d5 2.c4 e6 3.Nc3 c5 4.cxd5 cxd4 5.Qxd4 Nc6 6.Qd1 exd5 7.Qxd5 Be6
- Classical Tarrasch Gambit – D34 – 1.d4 d5 2.c4 e6 3.Nc3 c5 4.cxd5 exd5 5.Nf3 Nc6 6.g3 Nf6 7.Bg2 Be7 8.0-0 0-0 9.dxc5 d4
- Mar Del Plata Gambit – D57 – 1.d4 d5 2.c4 e6 3.Nc3 Nf6 4.Bg5 Be7 5.e3 0-0 6.Nf3 h6 7.Bh4 Ne4 8.Bxe7 Qxe7 9.cxd5 Nxc3 10.bxc3 exd5 11.Qb3 Rd8 12.c4 Be6
- Kaidanov Gambit – D47 – 1.d4 d5 2.c4 e6 3.Nc3 Nf6 4.Nf3 c6 5.e3 Nbd7 6.Bd3 dxc4 7.Bxc4 b5 8.Bd3 Bb7 9.e4 b4 10.Na4 c5 11.e5 Nd5 12.0-0 cxd4 13.Nxd4

== Ruy Lopez ==
- Brentano Gambit – C60 – 1.e4 e5 2.Nf3 Nc6 3.Bb5 g5
- Rotary-Albany Gambit – C60 – 1.e4 e5 2.Nf3 Nc6 3.Bb5 b6
- Jaenisch Gambit – C63 – 1.e4 e5 2.Nf3 Nc6 3.Bb5 f5
- Spanish Countergambit – C60 – 1.e4 e5 2.Nf3 Nc6 3.Bb5 d5
- Spanish Wing Gambit – C64 – 1.e4 e5 2.Nf3 Nc6 3.Bb5 Bc5 4.b4
- Cordel Gambit – C64 – 1.e4 e5 2.Nf3 Nc6 3.Bb5 Bc5 4.c3 f5
- Konikowski Gambit – C64 – 1.e4 e5 2.Nf3 Nc6 3.Bb5 Bc5 4.c3 d5
- Zukertort Gambit – C64 – 1.e4 e5 2.Nf3 Nc6 3.Bb5 Bc5 4.0-0 Nf6 5.c3
- Deferred Jaenisch Gambit – C70 – 1.e4 e5 2.Nf3 Nc6 3.Bb5 a6 4.Ba4 f5 5.exf5
- Nightingale Gambit – C70 – 1.e4 e5 2.Nf3 Nc6 3.Bb5 a6 4.Ba4 b5 5.Bb3 Na5 6.Bxf7+
- Morphy Defense, Alapin Gambit – C69 – 1.e4 e5 2.Nf3 Nc6 3.Bb5 a6 4.Bxc6 dxc6 5.0-0 Bg4 6.h3 h5
- Harksen Gambit – C80 – 1.e4 e5 2.Nf3 Nc6 3.Bb5 a6 4.Ba4 Nf6 5.0-0 Nxe4 6.d4 b5 7.Bb3 d5 8.c4
- Basque Gambit – C84 – 1.e4 e5 2.Nf3 Nc6 3.Bb5 a6 4.Ba4 Nf6 5.0-0 Be7 6.d4 exd4 7.e5 Ne4 8.c3
- Tartakower Gambit – C89 – 1.e4 e5 2.Nf3 Nc6 3.Bb5 Nge7 4.d4 exd4 5.Nxd4 g6 6.Nc3 Bg7 7.Be3 0-0 8.Qd2 d5
- Karpov Gambit – C80 – 1.e4 e5 2.Nf3 Nc6 3.Bb5 a6 4.Ba4 Nf6 5.0-0 Nxe4 6.d4 b5 7.Bb3 d5 8.dxe5 Be6 9.Nbd2 Nc5 10.c3 d4 11.Ng5

== Scotch Game ==
- Göring Gambit – C44 – 1.e4 e5 2.Nf3 Nc6 3.d4 exd4 4.c3
- Scotch Gambit – C44 – 1.e4 e5 2.Nf3 Nc6 3.d4 exd4 4.Bc4
- Relfsson Gambit – C44 – 1.e4 e5 2.Nf3 Nc6 3.d4 exd4 4.Bb5
- Alekhine Gambit – C45 – 1.e4 e5 2.Nf3 Nc6 3.d4 exd4 4.Nxd4 Nf6 5.e5
- Napoleon Gambit – C44 – 1.e4 e5 2.Nf3 Nc6 3.d4 Nxd4 4.Nxd4 exd4 5.Bc4

== Sicilian Defense ==
- Wing Gambit – B20 – 1.e4 c5 2.b4
- Brussels Gambit – B27 – 1.e4 c5 2.Nf3 f5
- Halász Gambit – B21 – 1.e4 c5 2.d4 cxd4 3.f4
- Morphy Gambit – B21 – 1.e4 c5 2.d4 cxd4 3.Nf3
- O'Kelly, Wing Gambit – B28 – 1.e4 c5 2.Nf3 a6 3.b4
- Smith–Morra Gambit – B21 – 1.e4 c5 2.d4 cxd4 3.c3
- Deferred Wing Gambit (e6) – B40 – 1.e4 c5 2.Nf3 e6 3.b4
- Deferred Wing Gambit (d6) – B50 – 1.e4 c5 2.Nf3 d6 3.b4
- Double-Dutch Gambit – B28 – 1.e4 c5 2.Nf3 f5 3.exf5 Nh6
- Tal Gambit – B23 – 1.e4 c5 2.f4 d5 3.exd5 Nf6
- Andreaschek Gambit – B21 – 1.e4 c5 2.d4 cxd4 3.Nf3 e5 4.c3
- San Francisco Gambit – B31 – 1.e4 c5 2.Nf3 Nc6 3.Bb5 Na5 4.b4
- Deferred Smith–Morra Gambit – B40 – 1.e4 c5 2.Nf3 e6 3.d4 cxd4 4.c3
- Coles Sicilian Gambit – B21 – 1.e4 c5 2.Nf3 a6 3.d4 cxd4 4.Bc4
- Dorfman Gambit – B52 – 1.e4 c5 2.Nf3 d6 3.Bb5+ Nc6 4.0-0 Bd7 5.Qe2 g6 6.e5
- Dekker Gambit – B90 – 1.e4 c5 2.Nf3 d6 3.d4 cxd4 4.Nxd4 Nf6 5.Nc3 a6 6.g4
- Lutikov Gambit – B31 – 1.e4 c5 2.Nf3 Nc6 3.Bb5 g6 4.0-0 Bg7 5.c3 Nf6 6.d4
- Gufeld Gambit – B31 – 1.e4 c5 2.Nf3 Nc6 3.Bb5 g6 4.0-0 Bg7 5.c3 e5 6.d4
- Haag Gambit – B51 – 1.e4 c5 2.Nf3 d6 3.Bb5+ Bd7 4.Bxd7+ Qxd7 5.0-0 Nc6 6.c3 Nf6 7.d4
- Nanu Gambit – B20 – 1.e4 c5 2.b4 cxb4 3.a3 d5 4.exd5 Qxd5 5.Nf3 e5 6.c4 Qe6 7.Bd3
- Ponomariov Gambit – B48 – 1.e4 c5 2.Nf3 e6 3.d4 cxd4 4.Nxd4 Nc6 5.Nc3 Qc7 6.Ndb5 Qb8 7.Be3 a6 8.Bb6
- Kasparov Gambit – B44 – 1.e4 c5 2.Nf3 e6 3.d4 cxd4 4.Nxd4 Nc6 5.Nb5 d6 6.c4 Nf6 7.N1c3 a6 8.Na3 d5
- Moscow Gambit – B51 – 1.e4 c5 2.Nf3 d6 3.Bb5+ Nc6 4.0-0 Bd7 5.c3 a6 6.Bxc6 Bxc6 7.Re1 Nf6 8.d4 Bxe4 9.Bg5
- Basman–Palatnik Gambit – B50 – 1.e4 c5 2.Nf3 d6 3.c3 Nf6 4.Be2 Nc6 5.d4 cxd4 6.cxd4 Nxe4
- Basman–Palatnik Double Gambit – B50 – 1.e4 c5 2.Nf3 d6 3.c3 Nf6 4.Be2 Nc6 5.d4 cxd4 6.cxd4 Nxe4 7.d5 Qa5+ 8.Nc3 Nxc3 9.bxc3
- Perényi Gambit – B88 – 1.e4 c5 2.Nf3 d6 3.d4 cxd4 4.Nxd4 Nf6 5.Nc3 e6 6.Be3 a6 7.g4 e5 8.Nf5 g6 9.g5
- Peresypkin's Sacrifice – B33 – 1.e4 c5 2.Nf3 Nc6 3.d4 cxd4 4.Nxd4 Nf6 5.Nc3 e5 6.Ndb5 d6 7.Bg5 a6 8.Na3 b5 9.Bxf6 gxf6 10.Nd5 f5 11.Bxb5

== Vienna Game ==
- Vienna Gambit – C25 – 1.e4 e5 2.Nc3 Nc6 3.f4
- Vienna Gambit – C29 – 1.e4 e5 2.Nc3 Nf6 3.f4
- Omaha Gambit – C25 – 1.e4 e5 2.Nc3 d6 3.f4
- Zhuravlev Countergambit – C25 – 1.e4 e5 2.Nc3 Bb4 3.Qg4 Nf6
- Steinitz Gambit – C25 – 1.e4 e5 2.Nc3 Nc6 3.f4 exf4 4.d4
- Erben Gambit – C25 – 1.e4 e5 2.Nc3 Nf6 3.g3 d5 4.exd5 c6
- Quelle Gambit – C25 – 1.e4 e5 2.Nc3 Nc6 3.f4 Bc5 4.fxe5 d6
- Bronstein Gambit – C23 – 1.e4 e5 2.Nc3 Nc6 3.Bc4 Nf6 4.f4 Nxe4 5.Nf3
- Meitner–Mieses Gambit – C23 – 1.e4 e5 2.Nc3 Nc6 3.Bc4 Bc5 4.Qg4 Qf6 5.Nd5
- Mariotti Gambit – C25 – 1.e4 e5 2.Nc3 Nc6 3.g3 Bc5 4.Bg2 h5 5.Nf3 h4
- Hamppe–Allgaier Gambit – C25 – 1.e4 e5 2.Nc3 Nc6 3.f4 exf4 4.Nf3 g5 5.h4 g4 6.Ng5
- Pierce Gambit – C25 – 1.e4 e5 2.Nc3 Nc6 3.f4 exf4 4.Nf3 g5 5.d4
- Hamppe–Muzio Gambit – C25 – 1.e4 e5 2.Nc3 Nc6 3.f4 exf4 4.Nf3 g5 5.Bc4 g4 6.0-0

== Zukertort Opening ==
- Herrstrom Gambit – A04 – 1.Nf3 g5
- Ross Gambit – A04 – 1.Nf3 e5
- John Tracy Gambit – A04 – 1.e4 Nf6 2.Nf3
- Lisitsin Gambit – A04 – 1.Nf3 f5 2.e4
- Deferred Lisitsin Gambit – A04 – 1.Nf3 f5 2.d3 Nf6 3.e4
- Vos Gambit – A04 – 1.d4 d6 2.Nf3 e5
- Speelsmet Gambit – A04 – 1.Nf3 c5 2.d4 cxd4 3.e3
- Pachman Gambit – A04 – 1.Nf3 d5 2.b3 c5 3.c4 dxc4 4.e3
- Regina-Nu Gambit – A04 – 1.Nf3 d5 2.b3 c5 3.c4 dxc4 4.Nc3
- Shabalov Gambit – A04 – 1.c4 e6 2.Nf3 a6 3.Nc3 c5 4.g3 b5
- Tennison Gambit – A06 – 1.Nf3 d5 2.e4 OR 1.e4 d5 2.Nf3
- Réti Opening – A09 – 1.Nf3 d5 2.c4
