= Chess opening =

Initial moves of a chess game

The opening is the initial stage of a chess game. The other phases are the middlegame and the endgame. A large amount of established opening theory exists, with some theory dating back centuries. Many opening sequences, known as openings, have standard names, such as 1.e4 c5, which is named the "Sicilian Defense"; these can be broken down further into variations. The Oxford Companion to Chess lists 1,327 named openings and variations, and there are many others with varying degrees of common usage. Opening moves that are considered standard are referred to as "book moves", or simply "book". When a game begins to deviate from known theory, the players are said to be "out of book". In some openings, book lines have been worked out for over 30 moves. Standard openings have a variety of aims, including developing rapidly, harmoniously, and actively, controlling the center, and king safety. There are also psychological goals and other gameplay-related goals.

Professional chess players spend years studying openings, and they continue doing so throughout their careers as opening theory continues to evolve. Players at the club level also study openings, but the importance of the opening phase is less there since games are rarely decided in the opening. The study of openings can become unbalanced if it is to the exclusion of tactical training and middlegame and endgame strategy.

== Aims of the opening ==
=== Common aims in opening play ===
Whether they are trying to gain the upper hand as White, or to equalize as Black or to create dynamic imbalances, players generally devote a lot of attention in the opening stages to the following strategies:

- Development: One of the main aims of the opening is to mobilize the pieces to useful squares where they will have an impact on the game. To this end, knights are usually developed to f3, c3, f6, and c6 (or sometimes e2, d2, e7, or d7), and both players' king and queen pawns are moved so the bishops can be developed (alternatively, the bishops may be fianchettoed with a maneuver such as g3 and Bg2). Rapid mobilization is considered key. The queen, and to a lesser extent the rooks, are not usually played to a central position until later in the game, when many minor pieces and pawns are no longer present.
- Control of the center: At the start of the game, it is not clear on which part of the board the pieces will be needed. Controlling the central squares, however, allows pieces to be moved to any part of the board relatively easily, and can also have a cramping effect on the opponent. The classical view is that central control is best effected by placing pawns there, ideally establishing pawns on d4 and e4 (or d5 and e5 for Black). However, the hypermodern school showed that it was not always necessary or even desirable to occupy the center in this way, and that too broad a pawn front could be attacked and destroyed, leaving its architect vulnerable; an impressive-looking pawn center is worth little unless it can be maintained. The hypermoderns instead advocated controlling the center from a distance with pieces, breaking down one's opponent's center, and only taking over the center oneself later in the game. This leads to openings such as Alekhine's Defense – in a line like 1.e4 Nf6 2.e5 Nd5 3.d4 d6 4.c4 Nb6 5.f4 (the Four Pawns Attack) White has a formidable pawn center for the moment, but Black hopes to undermine it later in the game, leaving White's position exposed.
- King safety: The king is somewhat exposed in the middle of the board. Measures must be taken to reduce his vulnerability. It is therefore common for both players either to castle in the opening (simultaneously developing one of the rooks) or to otherwise bring the king to the side of the board via artificial castling.
- Prevention of pawn weaknesses: Most openings strive to avoid the creation of pawn weaknesses such as isolated, doubled and backward pawns, pawn islands, etc. Some openings sacrifice endgame considerations for a quick attack on the opponent's position. Some unbalanced openings for Black, in particular, make use of this idea, such as the Dutch and the Sicilian. Other openings, such as the Alekhine and the Benoni, invite the opponent to overextend and form pawn weaknesses. Specific openings accept pawn weaknesses in exchange for compensation in the form of dynamic play. (See Pawn structure.)
- Piece coordination: As the players mobilize their pieces, they both seek to ensure that they are working harmoniously towards the control of key squares.
- Creating positions in which the player is more comfortable than the opponent: Transposition is one common way of doing this.

Apart from these ideas, other strategies used in the middlegame may also be carried out in the opening. These include preparing pawn breaks to create counterplay, creating weaknesses in the opponent's pawn structure, seizing control of key squares, making favorable exchanges of minor pieces (e.g. gaining the bishop pair), or gaining a space advantage, whether in the center or on the flanks.

=== Top-level objectives ===
At higher levels of competition, for many years the main objectives of opening play were to obtain a better position when playing as White and to equalize when playing as Black. The idea behind this is that playing first gives White a slight initial advantage; for example, White will be the first to attack if the game opens symmetrically (Black mirrors White's moves).

Since about the 1950s another objective has gradually become more dominant. According to IM Jeremy Silman, the purpose of the opening is to create dynamic imbalances between the two sides, which will determine the character of the middlegame and the strategic plans chosen by both sides. For example, in the main line of the Winawer Variation of the French Defense (1.e4 e6 2.d4 d5 3.Nc3 Bb4 4.e5 c5 5.a3 Bxc3+ 6.bxc3), White will try to use their bishop pair and space advantage to mount an attack on Black's kingside, while Black will seek simplifying exchanges (in particular, trading off one of White's bishops to blunt this advantage) and counterattack against the weakened pawns on White's queenside; both players accept different combinations of advantages and disadvantages. This idea was a doctrine of the Soviet school of chess.

A third objective, which is complementary to the previous ones and has been common since the 19th century, is to lure the opponent into positions with which the player is more familiar and comfortable than the opponent. This is usually done by transpositions, in which a game that apparently starts with one opening can reach a position that is normally produced by a different opening.

== Opening repertoires ==
Position: a8 black rook, b8 black knight, c8 black bishop, d8 black queen, e8 black king, f8 black bishop, h8 black rook, b7 black pawn, f7 black pawn, h7 black pawn, a6 black pawn, f6 black knight, e5 black pawn, f5 white pawn, g5 white pawn, d4 black pawn, c3 white knight, e3 white bishop, f3 white queen, a2 white pawn, b2 white pawn, c2 white pawn, f2 white pawn, h2 white pawn, a1 white rook, e1 white king, f1 white bishop, h1 white rook

The Perenyi Attack (1.e4 c5 2.Nf3 d6 3.d4 cxd4 4.Nxd4 Nf6 5.Nc3 a6 6.Be3 e6 7.g4), position after 7...e5 8.Nf5 g6 9.g5 gxf5 10.exf5 d5 11.Qf3 d4. This attack has been played several times between grandmasters, but chess author Lars Bo Hansen does not recommend this to amateurs.

Most players realize after a while that they play certain types of positions better than others, and that the amount of theory they can learn is limited. Therefore, most players specialize in certain openings where they know the theory and that lead to positions they favor. The set of openings a player has specialized in is called an opening repertoire. The main elements a player needs to consider in a repertoire are:

- As White, whether to open with 1.e4, 1.d4, 1.c4, or 1.Nf3
- As Black, a defense against any of these openings

A very narrow repertoire allows for deeper specialization but also makes a player less flexible to vary against different opponents. In addition, opponents may find it easier to prepare against a player with a narrow repertoire.

The main openings in a repertoire are usually reasonably sound; that is, they should lead to playable positions even against optimal counterplay. Unsound gambits are sometimes used as surprise weapons, but are unreliable for a stable repertoire. Repertoires often change as a player develops, and a player's advancement may be stifled if the opening repertoire does not evolve. Some openings that are effective against amateur players are less effective at the master level. For example, Black obtains active play in return for a pawn in the Benko Gambit; amateur players may have trouble defending against Black's activity, while masters are more skilled at defending and making use of the extra pawn. Some openings are so complex and theoretical that amateur players will have trouble understanding them. An example is the Perenyi Attack of the Sicilian Defense (see diagram), which yields an immensely complicated and tactical position which even strong players have difficulty handling, and which is beyond the comprehension of most amateurs.

== Opening nomenclature ==
Major changes in the rules of chess in the late fifteenth century increased the speed of the game, consequently emphasizing the importance of opening study. Thus, early chess books, such as the 1497 text of Luis Ramirez de Lucena, present opening analysis, as do Pedro Damiano (1512) and Ruy López de Segura (1561). Ruy López's disagreement with Damiano regarding the merits of 2...Nc6 led to 3.Bb5 (after 1.e4 e5 2.Nf3 Nc6) being named for him as the Ruy Lopez or Spanish Opening. Opening theory was studied more scientifically from the 1840s on, and many opening variations were discovered and named in this period and later.

Opening nomenclature developed haphazardly, and most names are historical accidents not based on systematic principles. In the early 1930s, the nascent FIDE embarked on a project to standardize opening nomenclature, culminating in the publication of a short booklet in 1933, but this had little impact.

The oldest openings tend to be named for geographic places and people. Many openings are named after nationalities of players who advocated them, for example Indian, English, Spanish, French, Dutch, Scotch, Russian, Italian, Scandinavian and Sicilian, or places where important games featuring the opening were played such as Vienna, Berlin, and Wilkes-Barre. The Catalan System is named after the Catalonia region.

Chess players' names are the most common sources of opening names. The name given to an opening is not always that of the first player to adopt it; often an opening is named for the player who was the first to popularize it or to publish analysis of it. Eponymic openings include the Ruy Lopez, Alekhine's Defense, Morphy Defense, and the Réti Opening. Some opening names honor two people, such as the Caro–Kann and the Smith–Morra.

A few opening names are purely descriptive, such as Giuoco Piano (Italian: quiet game), Two Knights Defense, Four Knights Game and Bishop's Opening.

Some openings have been given fanciful names, often names of animals. This practice became more common in the 20th century. By then, most of the more common and traditional sequences of opening moves had already been named, so these tend to be unusual or recently developed openings like the Orangutan, Hippopotamus, Elephant, Hedgehog, and, most recently, the Cow. A few are given humorous names, such as the Monkey's Bum and the Toilet Variation.

Opening names usually include characterizing terms like "opening", "variation", "defense", "gambit", or "attack"; however, the terminology is inconsistent and imprecise, and is not a useful basis for classification. Broadly, these terms are used as follows:

- Game: Used for some of the oldest named openings, such as the Scotch Game, Vienna Game, and Four Knights Game. In the 19th century it was used for other common openings such as the Sicilian Defense ("Sicilian Game") and French Defense ("French Game").
- Opening: This usually refers to an opening played by White, such as the English Opening or Bird's Opening.
- Defense: Refers to an opening chosen by Black, such as Two Knights Defense or Caro–Kann Defense. Some openings described as "defenses", such as the King's Indian Defense and Sicilian Defense, can in fact be quite aggressive.
- Gambit: An opening that involves the sacrifice of material, usually one or more pawns. Most openings described as "Gambits" are played by White (e.g., King's Gambit), but a few are played by Black (e.g., Latvian Gambit, Stafford Gambit). The terms "Accepted" or "Declined" may be appended to the name, depending on whether the opponent takes the offered material, such as in the Queen's Gambit Accepted and Queen's Gambit Declined.
- Countergambit: A gambit played by Black, often in response to another gambit. Examples of this include the Albin Countergambit in response to the Queen's Gambit, the Falkbeer Countergambit in response to the King's Gambit, and the Greco Counter Gambit (the former name of the Latvian Gambit) in response to the King's Knight Opening.
- Variation: Used to describe a branch of another named opening, for example the Najdorf Variation, a line of the Sicilian Defense.
- System: A method of development that can be used against many different setups by the opponent. Examples include London System, Colle System, Réti System, Barcza System, and Hedgehog System.
- Attack: Usually used to describe an aggressive or provocative variation such as the Albin–Chatard Attack (or Chatard–Alekhine Attack), the Fried Liver Attack in the Two Knights Defense, and the Grob Attack. The King's Indian Attack is an exception, describing a King's Indian Defense with colors reversed.
- Reversed, inverted: A Black opening played by White, or more rarely a White opening played by Black. Examples include the Sicilian Reversed (from the English Opening) and the Inverted Hungarian. The Reti, King's Indian Attack, Sicilian Reversed (from the English), and other "Black played by White with an extra tempo" often start with 1.Nf3 or 1.c4.
- Anti-: Prefix for openings designed to avoid a specific line, for example the Anti-Marshall (against the Marshall (Counter) Attack in the Ruy Lopez) and the Anti-Meran Gambit (against the Meran Variation of the Semi-Slav Defense).

A new sequence of moves in the opening is referred to as a theoretical novelty. When kept secret until used in a competitive game, it is often known as a prepared variation, a powerful weapon in top-class competition.

== Classification of chess openings ==
Chess openings are primarily categorized by move sequences. In the initial position, White has twenty legal moves. Of these, 1.e4 (moving the king pawn two squares) and 1.d4 (moving the queen pawn two squares) are by far the most popular, followed by 1.Nf3 and 1.c4. Black has twenty legal responses to each of White's possible first moves. Symmetrical replies (such as 1...e5 in response to 1.e4 or 1...Nf6 in response to 1.Nf3) are common. Defenses beginning with 1...c6 and 1...e6, typically intending to support the central thrust 2...d5, are also popular, as are defenses with an early ...d6, which tends to be coupled with a kingside fianchetto (...g6 and ...Bg7).

The most important scheme of classifying chess openings for serious players is by ECO code, a series of 500 opening codes assigned by the Encyclopaedia of Chess Openings. Although these codes are invaluable for the serious study of openings, they are impractical for a broad survey; a simpler breakdown is into the following three broad categories: king's pawn openings, which begin 1.e4; queen's pawn openings, which begin 1.d4; and flank openings, which begin with any other move. 1.e4 and 1.d4 have both been the most popular first move at various times. Both moves control the center and enable two pieces (the queen and a bishop) to move. The king's pawn openings can be divided into the Open Games, which begin symmetrically with 1.e4 e5, and the Semi-Open Games, which occur when Black replies to 1.e4 with any other move. The queen's pawn openings can be broken down into the Closed Games, characterized by the symmetrical 1.d4 d5, and the Semi-Closed Games, where Black responds to 1.d4 asymmetrically. Many authors do not use the term Semi-Closed, instead using Closed Games with a broader meaning.

The nature of play differs greatly between 1.e4 and 1.d4. The queen's support of the d-pawn makes it easier for White to later play d2–d4 after opening with 1.e4 than e2–e4 after opening with 1.d4. If White does play d2–d4 after 1.e4, Black often ends up capturing with ...exd4 (in the Open Games) or ...cxd4 (in the Semi-Open Games), so 1.e4 openings are more likely to lead to open games (i.e. open positions). In contrast, 1.d4 openings are more likely to lead to closed games (i.e. closed positions). These tendencies gave rise to the terminology of Open Games and Closed Games, though there are many exceptions (e.g. the Queen's Gambit Accepted is an open Closed Game). Also, transpositions among variations are more common after 1.d4 than after 1.e4, which tends to be more forcing.

=== Open Games: 1.e4 e5 ===
Position: a8 black rook, b8 black knight, c8 black bishop, d8 black queen, e8 black king, f8 black bishop, g8 black knight, h8 black rook, a7 black pawn, b7 black pawn, c7 black pawn, d7 black pawn, f7 black pawn, g7 black pawn, h7 black pawn, e5 black pawn, e4 white pawn, a2 white pawn, b2 white pawn, c2 white pawn, d2 white pawn, f2 white pawn, g2 white pawn, h2 white pawn, a1 white rook, b1 white knight, c1 white bishop, d1 white queen, e1 white king, f1 white bishop, g1 white knight, h1 white rook

Open Game

The Open Games begin with 1.e4 e5. They include many of the oldest and most extensively analyzed openings in chess. The most popular second move for White is 2.Nf3, attacking Black's undefended e-pawn, preparing to castle kingside, and supporting a future d2–d4. Black's most common reply is 2...Nc6, which usually leads to the Ruy Lopez (3.Bb5), Italian Game (3.Bc4), Scotch Game (3.d4), or Four Knights Game (3.Nc3 Nf6). The main alternative for Black is to counterattack with the symmetrical 2...Nf6, the Petrov Defense. Also possible is 2...d6, the Philidor Defense, which, though solid, often leads to cramped positions for Black.

The most popular alternatives to 2.Nf3 are 2.f4, the King's Gambit, where White sacrifices a pawn to divert Black's pawn from the center and enable rapid development; 2.Nc3, the Vienna Game, which also frequently features f2–f4 thrusts, among other potential plans; 2.Bc4, the Bishop's Opening, which often transposes to either the Italian Game or Vienna Game; and 2.d4, the Center Game.

=== Semi-Open Games: 1.e4 without 1...e5 ===
Position: a8 black rook, b8 black knight, c8 black bishop, d8 black queen, e8 black king, f8 black bishop, g8 black knight, h8 black rook, a7 black pawn, b7 black pawn, d7 black pawn, e7 black pawn, f7 black pawn, g7 black pawn, h7 black pawn, c5 black pawn, e4 white pawn, a2 white pawn, b2 white pawn, c2 white pawn, d2 white pawn, f2 white pawn, g2 white pawn, h2 white pawn, a1 white rook, b1 white knight, c1 white bishop, d1 white queen, e1 white king, f1 white bishop, g1 white knight, h1 white rook

Sicilian Defense

In the Semi-Open Games, White plays 1.e4 and Black breaks symmetry immediately by replying with a move other than 1...e5. By far the most popular of them is 1...c5, the Sicilian Defense, which is even more common than 1...e5 in tournament play. White's most common plan is to play 2.Nf3 and then 3.d4 cxd4 4.Nxd4, leading to a great number of extensively analyzed variations. These can be referred to collectively as Open Sicilians and are famous for featuring sharp and imbalanced play.

1...e6, the French Defense, and 1...c6, the Caro–Kann Defense, are also popular. They are solid openings which both tend to continue 2.d4 d5. White then has a major choice between advancing the e-pawn with 3.e5, exchanging it with 3.exd5, or defending it, most often with 3.Nc3. An immediate central challenge with 1...d5, the Scandinavian Defense, is also seen, though less popular than the French and Caro–Kann, which delay ...d5 until it can be supported with a pawn.

The Pirc Defense and the Modern Defense are closely related openings characterized by ...d6 and ...g6 (intending a kingside fianchetto with ...Bg7). Along with 1...Nf6, the Alekhine Defense, where Black invites White to kick the knight with 2.e5 and risk overextending, they are examples of hypermodern openings.

=== Closed Games: 1.d4 d5 ===
Position: a8 black rook, b8 black knight, c8 black bishop, d8 black queen, e8 black king, f8 black bishop, g8 black knight, h8 black rook, a7 black pawn, b7 black pawn, c7 black pawn, e7 black pawn, f7 black pawn, g7 black pawn, h7 black pawn, d5 black pawn, d4 white pawn, a2 white pawn, b2 white pawn, c2 white pawn, e2 white pawn, f2 white pawn, g2 white pawn, h2 white pawn, a1 white rook, b1 white knight, c1 white bishop, d1 white queen, e1 white king, f1 white bishop, g1 white knight, h1 white rook

Closed Game

The Closed Games begin with 1.d4 d5. The most important reply for White is 2.c4, the Queen's Gambit. In the Queen's Gambit Accepted, Black plays 2...dxc4, yielding the center to White in exchange for freer development. More often, Black declines to capture the pawn, usually with either 2...c6, the Slav Defense, or 2...e6, the Queen's Gambit Declined. Both moves lead to an immense forest of variations. There are also some less common ways to decline the gambit, such as 2...e5, the Albin Countergambit.

Instead of 2.c4, White can also play a number of other moves. Avoiding c4 often indicates an intention to play an opening system, which are characterized by avoiding pawn tension and instead simply developing, aiming for a particular formation without great concern over how Black chooses to defend. Such opening systems played by White include the London System, Colle System, and Stonewall Attack. Besides opening systems, another alternative is 2.e4, often leading to the Blackmar–Diemer Gambit.

=== Semi-Closed Games: 1.d4 without 1...d5 ===
Position: a8 black rook, b8 black knight, c8 black bishop, d8 black queen, e8 black king, f8 black bishop, h8 black rook, a7 black pawn, b7 black pawn, c7 black pawn, d7 black pawn, e7 black pawn, f7 black pawn, g7 black pawn, h7 black pawn, f6 black knight, d4 white pawn, a2 white pawn, b2 white pawn, c2 white pawn, e2 white pawn, f2 white pawn, g2 white pawn, h2 white pawn, a1 white rook, b1 white knight, c1 white bishop, d1 white queen, e1 white king, f1 white bishop, g1 white knight, h1 white rook

Indian Defense

The Semi-Closed Games are characterized by an asymmetrical reply to 1.d4. The Indian systems, which begin with 1...Nf6, are the most important of them. They employ hypermodern chess strategy. White's usual second move is 2.c4, grabbing a larger share of the center and allowing the move Nc3 (threatening e2–e4) without blocking the c-pawn.

2...e6, freeing the king's bishop, is Black's most popular reply to 2.c4. It can lead to the Nimzo-Indian Defense, which meets 3.Nc3 with the pin 3...Bb4. White often plays 3.Nf3 to avoid it, which can lead to the Queen's Indian Defense, Bogo-Indian Defense, and others, or transpose to the Queen's Gambit Declined. Alternatively, 3.g3 (or 3.Nf3 and 4.g3) leads to the Catalan Opening.

2...g6, preparing a fianchetto of the king's bishop, is a common alternative to 2...e6, and more aggressive. It can lead to the King's Indian Defense, which involves a later ...d6, or the Grünfeld Defense, which is distinguished by the move 3...d5.

2...c5 is also possible but riskier; it is typically met with 3.d5. 3...e6 leads to the Modern Benoni, an attempt by Black to unbalance the position and gain active piece play at the cost of allowing White a pawn wedge at d5 and a central majority. Alternatively, 3...b5 is the Benko Gambit, where Black sacrifices a pawn to open lines on the queenside.

Other less common replies to 2.c4 include 2...e5, the Budapest Gambit; 2...d6, the Old Indian Defense; and 2...Nc6, the Black Knights' Tango. White can also avoid 2.c4, such as with 2.Bg5, the Trompowsky Attack, or by playing an opening system.

Other examples of Semi-Closed Games include 1...f5, the Dutch Defense, an aggressive and unbalancing opening; 1...c5, the Benoni Defense, though it is more often reached via 1...Nf6 2.c4 and then 2...c5 (explained above) or 2...e6 3.Nf3 c5; and 1...e5, the unsound Englund Gambit.

=== Flank openings: Neither 1.e4 nor 1.d4 ===
Position: a8 black rook, b8 black knight, c8 black bishop, d8 black queen, e8 black king, f8 black bishop, g8 black knight, h8 black rook, a7 black pawn, b7 black pawn, c7 black pawn, d7 black pawn, e7 black pawn, f7 black pawn, g7 black pawn, h7 black pawn, c4 white pawn, a2 white pawn, b2 white pawn, d2 white pawn, e2 white pawn, f2 white pawn, g2 white pawn, h2 white pawn, a1 white rook, b1 white knight, c1 white bishop, d1 white queen, e1 white king, f1 white bishop, g1 white knight, h1 white rook

English Opening

Flank openings are characterized by attacking the center from the flanks rather than immediately occupying it with pawns. Among them, 1.Nf3 and 1.c4 are the most common. White often, but not always, plays in hypermodern style in flank openings.

1.Nf3, developing a piece and preventing 1...e5, often transposes into lines frequently reached via 1.d4 (or 1.c4) by a different move order. Independent openings, such as the Réti Opening and King's Indian Attack, are also common. Some of these are opening systems where White adopts a set pattern of development and avoids heavily analyzed openings such as those following 1.e4.

1.c4, known as the English Opening, also frequently transposes into a 1.d4 opening, but there are many independent lines, such as the Reversed Sicilian (1.c4 e5), the Symmetrical Variation (1.c4 c5), and the Mikėnas–Carls Variation (1.c4 Nf6 2.Nc3 e6 3.e4). Play can proceed in hypermodern style, such as by fianchettoing one or both bishops, or it can continue in a more classical style by occupying the center with e2–e4 or d2–d4 on a later move.

After 1.Nf3 and 1.c4, the next most popular moves are to prepare an immediate fianchetto, either with 1.g3, which is flexible and usually ends up transposing into another opening such as the Réti or the English, or 1.b3, which has a slightly more independent character. 1.b4 is also sometimes played; it secures more space than 1.b3 but leaves the b-pawn undefended.

1.f4, known as Bird's Opening, is another possibility. Black often replies with 1...d5, resembling a reversed Dutch Defense. Though it is the kingside equivalent of the English Opening, it is much less common, as advancing the f-pawn weakens the protection of White's king.

1.Nc3 is occasionally seen. Like 1.Nf3, which is much more popular, it develops a piece. 1.Nc3 is less flexible, however; blocking the c-pawn with a knight has more of an impact than blocking the f-pawn does.

=== Unusual first moves for White ===
Other moves are not regarded as effective ways to exploit White's first-move advantage and thus are rarely played. Although some of these openings are not actually bad for White, each of the eleven remaining possible first moves suffers from one or more of the following defects compared to the more popular choices:

- too passive for White (1.d3, 1.e3, or 1.c3)
- does little to aid White's development or control the center (1.a3, 1.a4, 1.h3, or 1.h4)
- develops a knight to an inferior square (1.Na3 or 1.Nh3)
- gratuitously weakens White's position (1.f3 or 1.g4)

== See also ==
- Outline of chess § Chess openings
- Chess opening book
- List of chess openings
- List of chess openings named after people
- List of chess openings named after places
- List of chess gambits
- Encyclopaedia of Chess Openings
- Chess opening theory table
- Middlegame
- Endgame
