= Tennison Gambit =

Position: a8 black rook, b8 black knight, c8 black bishop, d8 black queen, e8 black king, f8 black bishop, g8 black knight, h8 black rook, a7 black pawn, b7 black pawn, c7 black pawn, e7 black pawn, f7 black pawn, g7 black pawn, h7 black pawn, d5 black pawn, e4 white pawn, f3 white knight, a2 white pawn, b2 white pawn, c2 white pawn, d2 white pawn, f2 white pawn, g2 white pawn, h2 white pawn, a1 white rook, b1 white knight, c1 white bishop, d1 white queen, e1 white king, f1 white bishop, h1 white rook
- Moves: 1.Nf3 d5 2.e4 or 1.e4 d5 2.Nf3
- ECO: A06
- Named after: Otto Mandrup Tennison
- Parent: Zukertort Opening
- Synonyms: Abonyi Gambit; Black Rook's Gambit; Lemberg Gambit; Lviv Gambit; Polish Gambit; Zukertort Gambit; ICBM Gambit; ICBM Variation

The Tennison Gambit is a chess opening in which White gambits a pawn.

The opening moves begin with either the Zukertort Opening:

1. Nf3 d5
2. e4

or the Scandinavian Defense:

1. e4 d5
2. Nf3

The Encyclopaedia of Chess Openings code for the Tennison Gambit is A06.

== History ==
The first person to significantly research this opening was chess amateur Otto Mandrup Tennison (1834–1909). Tennison was born in Denmark, studied in Germany and moved to the United States in 1854. There, he played in the chess clubs of New Orleans. Many strong players picked up the idea from the first half of the 20th century.

== Analysis ==
The Tennison Gambit is considered theoretically unsound, as White sacrifices a pawn immediately with no solid positional compensation. Without precise counterplay, however, Black can easily fall into a number of tactical traps that leave White ahead.

After 2...dxe4 3.Ng5:

- 3...Nf6 4.Bc4 e6 5.Nc3 a6 6.Ngxe4 Nxe4 7.Nxe4 b5 8.Be2 Bb7 9.Bf3 and White had the advantage in Ermenkov–Bonchev, Bulgaria 1970.
- 3...e5! 4.Nxe4 f5 and 4.h4 Be7 5.Bc4 Bxg5 6.Qh5 g6 7.Qxg5 f6 favor Black.
- 3...Bf5 and Black has the better position. A continuation might be 4.g4 Bg6 5.Bg2 h5 and Black keeps the advantage in a sharp position.

== Notable games ==
Otto M. Tennison vs. NN, New Orleans 1891:
1. Nf3 d5 2. e4 dxe4 3. Ng5 f5 4. Bc4 Nh6 5. Nxh7 Rxh7 6. Qh5+ Kd7 7. Qg6 Rh8 8. Be6+ Kc6 9. Bxc8+ Qd6 10. Qe8+ Kb6 11. Qa4 If 11...Qc6, then 12.Qb3+ Ka6 13.Nc3 any 14.Bxb7+; if 11...e6, then 12.a3 etc. (Tennison) 1–0

== See also ==
- List of chess gambits
