= Benoni Defense =

Position: a8 black rook, b8 black knight, c8 black bishop, d8 black queen, e8 black king, f8 black bishop, g8 black knight, h8 black rook, a7 black pawn, b7 black pawn, d7 black pawn, e7 black pawn, f7 black pawn, g7 black pawn, h7 black pawn, c5 black pawn, d4 white pawn, a2 white pawn, b2 white pawn, c2 white pawn, e2 white pawn, f2 white pawn, g2 white pawn, h2 white pawn, a1 white rook, b1 white knight, c1 white bishop, d1 white queen, e1 white king, f1 white bishop, g1 white knight, h1 white rook
- Moves: 1.d4 c5
- ECO: A43–A44; A56–A79
- Origin: Ben-Oni oder die Vertheidigungen gegen die Gambitzüge im Schache by Aaron Reinganum (1825)
- Named after: Hebrew: בֶּן־אוֹנִי; "son of my sorrow"
- Parent: Queen's Pawn Opening

The Benoni Defense, or simply the Benoni, is a chess opening characterized by an early reply of ...c5 against White's opening move 1.d4.

The original form of the Benoni, now known as the Old Benoni, is characterized by

1. d4 c5

This leaves Black a few options such as an early ...f5 and an early dark-squared bishop trade by ...Be7–g5. However, because White has not played c4 yet, White also has more options, and often plays Nc3 while the pawn remains on c2, allowing White to play an earlier e4.

More commonly, the Benoni is reached by the sequence:

1. d4 Nf6
2. c4 c5
3. d5

The most common following moves for Black are either to then play 3...e6, leading to the Modern Benoni, or to offer a pawn sacrifice with 3...b5 in exchange for a queenside attack, known as the Benko Gambit. 3...d6 or 3...g6 are also seen, typically transposing to main lines, or to lines of the King's Indian Defense.

If White plays 2.Nf3 instead of 2.c4, Black can still play 2...c5. White usually responds by pushing by with 3.d5, just as in the Benoni. If White later plays c4, the positions transpose into the Benoni. Otherwise, Nc3 is usually played (while the c pawn remains on the second rank), and leads to the Spielmann-Indian Variation, which has many similar patterns to the Benoni. White's early committal of Nf3 distinguishes it from the Old Benoni, where White avoids or delays Nf3.

== Etymology ==
Benoni (Hebrew: בֶּן־אוֹנִי; Ben-Oni) is an ancient Hebrew name, still occasionally used, meaning "son of my sorrow". It is a reference to the Biblical account of the dying Rachel giving birth to Benjamin, whom she named Ben-Oni.

In 1825 Aaron Reinganum, a prominent member of the Frankfurt Jewish community, published a book entitled Ben-Oni oder die Vertheidigungen gegen die Gambitzüge im Schache in which he analyzed several defenses to the King's Gambit and the Queen's Gambit, as well as the then unknown opening 1.d4 c5. Reinganum, who studied chess to alleviate his depression, conceived the name "Ben-Oni" as a nickname for his writings rather than the name of an opening.

In the 1843 Staunton–Saint Amant match, Saint Amant met 1.d4 with 1...c5 in the second and fourth games. Saint Amant wrote in Le Palamède (1843): "This opening is not favorable to Black. Bennoni [sic] gives some examples; but it loses time to White, which deprives Black of all the advantages of a good opening." Staunton wrote in The Chess-Player's Companion (1849): "M. St. Amant derived this somewhat bizarre defense from Benoni. (Benoni, oder Vertheidigungen die Gambitzüge im Schache, &c. Von Aaron Reinganum, Frankfort, 1825.)" Staunton also mentions "Ben-Oni" while commenting on the move 1...c5 in The Chess-player's Handbook (1847, page 382).

Subsequently, the name "Benoni" came to be associated with the opening 1.d4 c5, and later with 1.d4 Nf6 2.c4 c5 and other openings in which Black counters d2–d4 with an early ....c7–c5, without first having played ...d7–d5.

== Old Benoni: 1.d4 c5 ==
Position: a8 black rook, b8 black knight, c8 black bishop, d8 black queen, e8 black king, f8 black bishop, g8 black knight, h8 black rook, a7 black pawn, b7 black pawn, d7 black pawn, e7 black pawn, f7 black pawn, g7 black pawn, h7 black pawn, c5 black pawn, d4 white pawn, a2 white pawn, b2 white pawn, c2 white pawn, e2 white pawn, f2 white pawn, g2 white pawn, h2 white pawn, a1 white rook, b1 white knight, c1 white bishop, d1 white queen, e1 white king, f1 white bishop, g1 white knight, h1 white rook

Old Benoni Defense

The Old Benoni Defense starts with 1.d4 c5. White usually replies 2.d5 in order to gain space, as 2.dxc5 e6 leads to no advantage, and 2.e4 transposes to the Morra Gambit, also promising equality at best. The Old Benoni may transpose to the Czech Benoni, but there are a few independent variations. This form has never attracted serious interest in high-level play, though Alexander Alekhine defeated Efim Bogoljubow with it in one game of their second match, in 1934. The Old Benoni is sometimes called the Blackburne Defense after Englishman Joseph Henry Blackburne, the first player known to have used it successfully.

== Czech Benoni: 3...e5 ==
Position: a8 black rook, b8 black knight, c8 black bishop, d8 black queen, e8 black king, f8 black bishop, h8 black rook, a7 black pawn, b7 black pawn, d7 black pawn, f7 black pawn, g7 black pawn, h7 black pawn, f6 black knight, c5 black pawn, d5 white pawn, e5 black pawn, c4 white pawn, a2 white pawn, b2 white pawn, e2 white pawn, f2 white pawn, g2 white pawn, h2 white pawn, a1 white rook, b1 white knight, c1 white bishop, d1 white queen, e1 white king, f1 white bishop, g1 white knight, h1 white rook

Czech Benoni

In the Czech Benoni, also known as the Hromadka Benoni, after Karel Hromádka, Black plays 1.d4 Nf6 2.c4 c5 3.d5 e5. The Czech Benoni is more solid than the Modern Benoni, but also more passive. The middlegames arising from this line are characterized by much maneuvering; in most lines, Black will look to break with ...b7–b5 or ...f7–f5 after due preparation, while White may play Nc3, e4, h3, Bd3, Nf3, and g4, in order to gain space on the kingside and prevent ...f5. Grandmaster Ben Finegold often plays this line; he notably beat Mamedyarov in this variation.

== Benko Gambit: 3...b5 ==
Position: a8 black rook, b8 black knight, c8 black bishop, d8 black queen, e8 black king, f8 black bishop, h8 black rook, a7 black pawn, d7 black pawn, e7 black pawn, f7 black pawn, g7 black pawn, h7 black pawn, f6 black knight, b5 black pawn, c5 black pawn, d5 white pawn, c4 white pawn, a2 white pawn, b2 white pawn, e2 white pawn, f2 white pawn, g2 white pawn, h2 white pawn, a1 white rook, b1 white knight, c1 white bishop, d1 white queen, e1 white king, f1 white bishop, g1 white knight, h1 white rook

Benko Gambit

The Benko Gambit, also known as the Volga Gambit, begins 1.d4 Nf6 2.c4 c5 3.d5 b5. Play usually continues 4.cxb5 a6 5.bxa6 Bxa6. Black sacrifices a pawn for open lines and long-term positional pressure on the queenside, and typically plans to fianchetto with g6 and Bg7, the bishop's scope being unimpeded by pawns. With a bishop on a6, if White plays e3 or e4, Black can play Bxf1, forcing the king to recapture and thus taking away White's castling rights; in practice, White often allows this, considering the loss of time worth the price of trading black's strong light squared bishop. White can decline the gambit, typically with 4.Nf3, 4.Qc2, 4.Nd2, or 4.a4, or only half accept it, typically by playing 5.b6, 5.e3, 5.f3, or 5.Nc3, often intending to return the pawn.

== Modern Benoni: 3...e6 ==
Position: a8 black rook, b8 black knight, c8 black bishop, d8 black queen, e8 black king, f8 black bishop, h8 black rook, a7 black pawn, b7 black pawn, d7 black pawn, f7 black pawn, g7 black pawn, h7 black pawn, e6 black pawn, f6 black knight, c5 black pawn, d5 white pawn, c4 white pawn, a2 white pawn, b2 white pawn, e2 white pawn, f2 white pawn, g2 white pawn, h2 white pawn, a1 white rook, b1 white knight, c1 white bishop, d1 white queen, e1 white king, f1 white bishop, g1 white knight, h1 white rook

Modern Benoni

The Modern Benoni, 1.d4 Nf6 2.c4 c5 3.d5 e6, is the second most common form of Benoni after the Benko Gambit. Black's intention is to play ...exd5 and create a queenside pawn majority, whose advance will be supported by a fianchettoed bishop on g7. The combination of these two features differentiates Black's setup from the other Benoni defenses and the King's Indian Defense, although transpositions between these openings are common. The Modern Benoni is classified under the ECO codes A60–A79.

=== Blumenfeld Gambit: 3...e6 4.Nf3 b5 ===
The Blumenfeld is a variant of the Modern Benoni beginning 1.d4 Nf6 2.c4 c5 3.d5 e6 4.Nf3 b5. While it superficially resembles the Benko Gambit, it has a different strategic goal, that being to initiate counterplay against White's pawn center rather than develop positional pressure on the queen's side.

=== Snake Benoni: 3...e6 4.Nc3 exd5 5.cxd5 Bd6 ===
Position: a8 black rook, b8 black knight, c8 black bishop, d8 black queen, e8 black king, h8 black rook, a7 black pawn, b7 black pawn, d7 black pawn, f7 black pawn, g7 black pawn, h7 black pawn, d6 black bishop, f6 black knight, c5 black pawn, d5 white pawn, c3 white knight, a2 white pawn, b2 white pawn, e2 white pawn, f2 white pawn, g2 white pawn, h2 white pawn, a1 white rook, c1 white bishop, d1 white queen, e1 white king, f1 white bishop, g1 white knight, h1 white rook

Snake Benoni

The Snake Benoni is a variant of the Modern Benoni where the bishop is developed to d6 rather than g7. This opening was invented in 1982 by Rolf Olav Martens, who gave it its name because of the sinuous movement of the bishop—in Martens's original concept, Black follows up with 6...Bc7 and sometimes ...Ba5—and because the Swedish word for "snake", orm, was an anagram of his initials. Normunds Miezis has been a regular exponent of this variation. Aside from Martens's plan, 6...0-0 intending ...Re8, ...Bf8 and a potential redeployment of the bishop to g7, has also been tried. White appears to retain the advantage against both setups.

== ECO ==
The Encyclopaedia of Chess Openings has many codes for the Benoni Defense.

Old Benoni Defense:

- A43 1.d4 c5
- A44 1.d4 c5 2.d5 e5

Benoni Defense:

- A56 1.d4 Nf6 2.c4 c5 (includes Czech Benoni)
- A57–A59 1.d4 Nf6 2.c4 c5 3.d5 b5 (Benko Gambit)
- A60 1.d4 Nf6 2.c4 c5 3.d5 e6
- A61 1.d4 Nf6 2.c4 c5 3.d5 e6 4.Nc3 exd5 5.cxd5 d6 6.Nf3 g6

Fianchetto Variation:

- A62 1.d4 Nf6 2.c4 c5 3.d5 e6 4.Nc3 exd5 5.cxd5 d6 6.Nf3 g6 7.g3 Bg7 8.Bg2 0-0
- A63 1.d4 Nf6 2.c4 c5 3.d5 e6 4.Nc3 exd5 5.cxd5 d6 6.Nf3 g6 7.g3 Bg7 8.Bg2 0-0 9.0-0 Nbd7
- A64 1.d4 Nf6 2.c4 c5 3.d5 e6 4.Nc3 exd5 5.cxd5 d6 6.Nf3 g6 7.g3 Bg7 8.Bg2 0-0 9.0-0 Nbd7 10.Nd2 a6 11.a4 Re8

Modern Benoni:

- A65 1.d4 Nf6 2.c4 c5 3.d5 e6 4.Nc3 exd5 5.cxd5 d6 6.e4
- A66 1.d4 Nf6 2.c4 c5 3.d5 e6 4.Nc3 exd5 5.cxd5 d6 6.e4 g6 7.f4

Taimanov Variation:

- A67 1.d4 Nf6 2.c4 c5 3.d5 e6 4.Nc3 exd5 5.cxd5 d6 6.e4 g6 7.f4 Bg7 8.Bb5+

Four Pawns Attack:

- A68 1.d4 Nf6 2.c4 c5 3.d5 e6 4.Nc3 exd5 5.cxd5 d6 6.e4 g6 7.f4 Bg7 8.Nf3 0-0
- A69 1.d4 Nf6 2.c4 c5 3.d5 e6 4.Nc3 exd5 5.cxd5 d6 6.e4 g6 7.f4 Bg7 8.Nf3 0-0 9.Be2 Re8

Classical Benoni:

- A70 1.d4 Nf6 2.c4 c5 3.d5 e6 4.Nc3 exd5 5.cxd5 d6 6.e4 g6 7.Nf3
- A71 1.d4 Nf6 2.c4 c5 3.d5 e6 4.Nc3 exd5 5.cxd5 d6 6.e4 g6 7.Nf3 Bg7 8.Bg5
- A72 1.d4 Nf6 2.c4 c5 3.d5 e6 4.Nc3 exd5 5.cxd5 d6 6.e4 g6 7.Nf3 Bg7 8.Be2 0-0
- A73 1.d4 Nf6 2.c4 c5 3.d5 e6 4.Nc3 exd5 5.cxd5 d6 6.e4 g6 7.Nf3 Bg7 8.Be2 0-0 9.0-0
- A74 1.d4 Nf6 2.c4 c5 3.d5 e6 4.Nc3 exd5 5.cxd5 d6 6.e4 g6 7.Nf3 Bg7 8.Be2 0-0 9.0-0 a6
- A75 1.d4 Nf6 2.c4 c5 3.d5 e6 4.Nc3 exd5 5.cxd5 d6 6.e4 g6 7.Nf3 Bg7 8.Be2 0-0 9.0-0 a6 10.a4 Bg4
- A76 1.d4 Nf6 2.c4 c5 3.d5 e6 4.Nc3 exd5 5.cxd5 d6 6.e4 g6 7.Nf3 Bg7 8.Be2 0-0 9.0-0 Re8
- A77 1.d4 Nf6 2.c4 c5 3.d5 e6 4.Nc3 exd5 5.cxd5 d6 6.e4 g6 7.Nf3 Bg7 8.Be2 0-0 9.0-0 Re8 10.Nd2
- A78 1.d4 Nf6 2.c4 c5 3.d5 e6 4.Nc3 exd5 5.cxd5 d6 6.e4 g6 7.Nf3 Bg7 8.Be2 0-0 9.0-0 Re8 10.Nd2 Na6
- A79 1.d4 Nf6 2.c4 c5 3.d5 e6 4.Nc3 exd5 5.cxd5 d6 6.e4 g6 7.Nf3 Bg7 8.Be2 0-0 9.0-0 Re8 10.Nd2 Na6 11.f3

== See also ==
- Franco-Benoni Defense (1.e4 e6 2.d4 c5)
