= István Abonyi =

Hungarian chess player

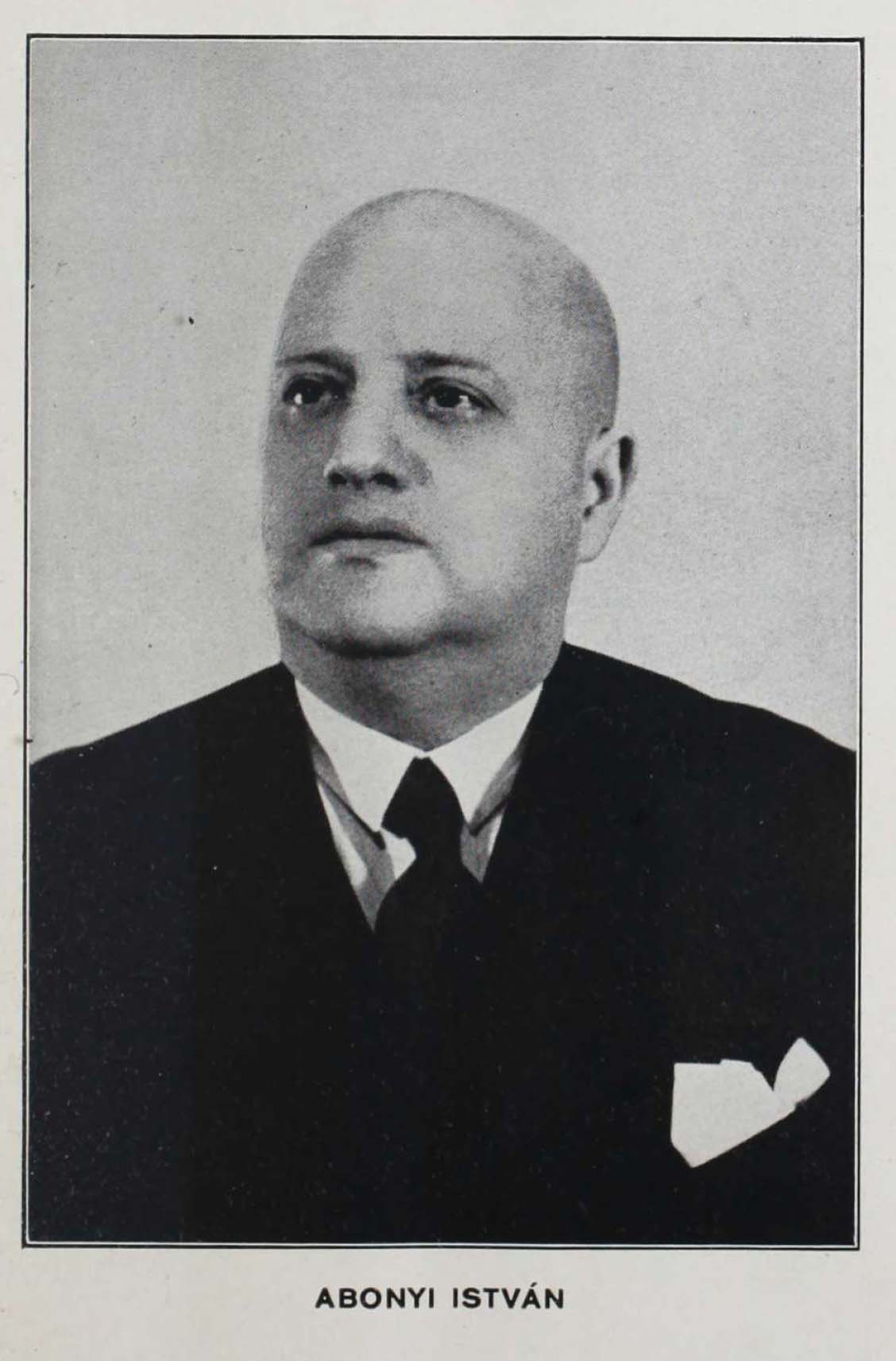
Image of Abonyi István

István Abonyi (18 August 1886 – 5 June 1942) was a Hungarian chess master, who was born and died in Budapest.

In 1912, Abonyi played the Abonyi Gambit (1.Nf3 d5 2.e4) for the first time.

István Abonyi with Zsigmond Barász and Gyula Breyer developed the Budapest Gambit. Abonyi played it against the Dutch surgeon Johannes Esser in a small tournament at Budapest 1916. He published analysis on the Abonyi Variation of the Budapest Gambit (1.d4 Nf6 2.c4 e5 3.dxe5 Ng4 4.e4 Nxe5 5.f4 Nec6) in 1922 in Deutsches Wochenschach.

He was one of the 15 founders of FIDE on 20 July 1924, during 1st unofficial Chess Olympiad in Paris.

On January 21–22, 1928, Abonyi played 300 opponents on 105 boards in Budapest, scoring 79 wins, 6 losses, and 20 draws.

From 1935 to 1939, Abonyi was the president of the International Correspondence Chess Federation (IFSB).

For many years, Abonyi was the president of the Hungarian Chess Federation and edited the Hungarian chess magazine, Magyar Sakkvilag (Hungarian Chessworld).

== See also ==
- Tennison Gambit, also known as the Abonyi Gambit.
