= Catalan Opening =

Position: a8 black rook, b8 black knight, c8 black bishop, d8 black queen, e8 black king, f8 black bishop, h8 black rook, a7 black pawn, b7 black pawn, c7 black pawn, d7 black pawn, f7 black pawn, g7 black pawn, h7 black pawn, e6 black pawn, f6 black knight, c4 white pawn, d4 white pawn, g3 white pawn, a2 white pawn, b2 white pawn, e2 white pawn, f2 white pawn, h2 white pawn, a1 white rook, b1 white knight, c1 white bishop, d1 white queen, e1 white king, f1 white bishop, g1 white knight, h1 white rook
- Moves: 1.d4 Nf6 2.c4 e6 3.g3
- ECO: E00–E09
- Origin: Barcelona 1929, by Savielly Tartakower
- Named after: Catalonia
- Parent: Indian Defence

The Catalan Opening is a chess opening where White plays d4 and c4 and fianchettoes the white bishop on g2. A common opening sequence is:

1. d4 Nf6
2. c4 e6
3. g3

although various other openings can transpose into the Catalan.

The Catalan has had proponents at the highest level in chess, with Vladimir Kramnik, Viswanathan Anand and Magnus Carlsen all employing the opening in their World Chess Championship title games. A number of other grandmasters have successfully played the Catalan, including Fabiano Caruana, Daniil Dubov, Anish Giri and Ding Liren.

The Encyclopaedia of Chess Openings (ECO) lists codes E01–E09 for lines with 1.d4 Nf6 2.c4 e6 3.g3 d5 4.Bg2; other lines are part of E00.

== History ==
The Catalan derives its name from Catalonia, after tournament organisers at the 1929 Barcelona tournament asked Savielly Tartakower to create a new variation in homage to Catalonia's chess history. It had been played a few times before Tartakower's usage in the tournament, however: for instance, Réti–Leonhardt, Berlin 1928 transposed into an Open Catalan. The opening cemented itself in the repertoire of leading players of the 1930s and 1940s, such as world champions Jose Raul Capablanca, Alexander Alekhine and Mikhail Botvinnik, as well as top grandmasters such as Salo Flohr, Paul Keres and Samuel Reshevsky.

The Catalan came to prominence at the top level when both Garry Kasparov and Viktor Korchnoi played it in their Candidates Semifinal match in London in 1983: five games of the eleven-game match featured the Catalan.

In 2004, Ruben Felgaer won a tournament celebrating the 75th anniversary of Barcelona 1929 and the birth of the Catalan Opening, ahead of Grandmasters (GMs) Viktor Korchnoi, Mihail Marin, Lluis Comas and Viktor Moskalenko and International Master Manel Granados. Each game in the tournament, which was also held in Barcelona, began with the moves 1.d4 d5 2.c4 e6 3.g3 Nf6.

With its use by Vladimir Kramnik, the Catalan gained a good deal of attention by high-level GMs in the 2010s. Kramnik played the opening three times in the World Chess Championship 2006. The Catalan was also played four times by Viswanathan Anand in the World Chess Championship 2010; in both instances, the opponent was Veselin Topalov, and in each instance, White scored two more points than Black.

Magnus Carlsen began to employ the Catalan as his main opening in the late 2010s, most notably using it in the second game of the 2021 World Chess Championship against Ian Nepomniachtchi, and used it extensively at the Tata Steel Chess Tournament 2022.

== Basics ==
The Catalan is a system against Queen's Gambit Declined structures where White adopts a structure which combines the d4-c4 pawn duo of the Queen's Gambit and the kingside fianchetto. This places pressure mainly on the queenside while hoping to keep the white king safe in the long-term. Do note that while White may employ similar setups in other openings, such as the Fianchetto System against the King's Indian Defence, these setups play differently from the Catalan. The c4-pawn is left vulnerable, however. White aims to sacrifice this pawn in exchange for opening up the h1–a8 diagonal, making the g2-bishop a very active piece.

Black's approaches to play against the Catalan generally fall into two categories: in the Open Catalan, Black plays ...dxc4 and can either try to hold on to the pawn with ...b5 or give it back for extra time to free their game. In the Closed Catalan, Black does not capture on c4; their game can be somewhat cramped for a while, but is quite solid. The classical line of the Catalan can arise from either the immediate ...dxc4, or via a Closed Catalan move order. Black also has several setups in both the Open and Closed Catalan with ...Bb4+, aiming to force White to misplace one of their pieces, usually the dark-squared bishop on d2. Additionally, Black has ways to avoid the Catalan.

To counteract White's g2-bishop, Black can either play ...c6 or the ...Bd7–Bc6 maneuver, contesting the h1–a8 diagonal. In the Catalan, White often has ideas related to Nf3–Ne5, opening up the g2-bishop's line of sight, targeting the c4 pawn, and pressuring the c6 square, and is the standard response to ...Bd7 ideas. Black ideally meets any discovered attack on the a8 rook with ...Nd5. White usually aims for queenside pressure and ultimately aims to push e2–e4, controlling the centre. The white queen is ideally positioned on c2, supporting the e2–e4 advance and pressuring the c4 pawn. If Black chooses to consolidate their extra pawn, White aims to break through their queenside structure with a2–a4 and b2–b3.

The Catalan is usually referred to as a positional opening, but some lines can have tactical or forcing natures. The theory of the Catalan is extensively developed. It is thought to give White a small advantage with precise play.

== Move Orders ==
Move orders for the Catalan

Position: a8 black rook, b8 black knight, c8 black bishop, d8 black queen, e8 black king, f8 black bishop, h8 black rook, a7 black pawn, b7 black pawn, c7 black pawn, d7 black pawn, f7 black pawn, g7 black pawn, h7 black pawn, e6 black pawn, f6 black knight, c4 white pawn, d4 white pawn, g3 white pawn, a2 white pawn, b2 white pawn, e2 white pawn, f2 white pawn, h2 white pawn, a1 white rook, b1 white knight, c1 white bishop, d1 white queen, e1 white king, f1 white bishop, g1 white knight, h1 white rook

White can immediately play g3.

Position: a8 black rook, b8 black knight, c8 black bishop, d8 black queen, e8 black king, f8 black bishop, h8 black rook, a7 black pawn, b7 black pawn, c7 black pawn, e7 black pawn, f7 black pawn, g7 black pawn, h7 black pawn, f6 black knight, d5 black pawn, d4 white pawn, f3 white knight, g3 white pawn, a2 white pawn, b2 white pawn, c2 white pawn, e2 white pawn, f2 white pawn, h2 white pawn, a1 white rook, b1 white knight, c1 white bishop, d1 white queen, e1 white king, f1 white bishop, h1 white rook

White can delay c4.

The Catalan can be achieved with multiple move orders. Against 1...Nf6 and 2...e6, 3.Nf3 gives Black the option to enter the Queen's Indian Defence or Bogo-Indian Defence. 3.g3 avoids these possibilities, but gives Black the option to play an improved Modern Benoni, as White's kingside fianchetto systems against the Benoni are not very critical for Black.

White can also delay c2–c4, which allows the Catalan setup to be reached more consistently. For example, against 1...d5, delaying c4 allows White to avoid the Queen's Gambit Accepted.

== Open Catalan: 4...dxc4 ==
Position: a8 black rook, b8 black knight, c8 black bishop, d8 black queen, e8 black king, f8 black bishop, h8 black rook, a7 black pawn, b7 black pawn, c7 black pawn, f7 black pawn, g7 black pawn, h7 black pawn, e6 black pawn, f6 black knight, c4 black pawn, d4 white pawn, g3 white pawn, a2 white pawn, b2 white pawn, e2 white pawn, f2 white pawn, g2 white bishop, h2 white pawn, a1 white rook, b1 white knight, c1 white bishop, d1 white queen, e1 white king, g1 white knight, h1 white rook

The Open Catalan: 1.d4 Nf6 2.c4 e6 3.g3 d5 4.Bg2 dxc4

With ...dxc4, Black has entered the Open Catalan. At the moment, Black has a pawn advantage. However, this capture has also freed the a8–h1 diagonal for the g2-bishop. Additionally, Black's pawn on c4 is weak and is usually returned to White in exchange for time to develop. In some systems, Black consolidates and keeps the extra pawn, but White receives compensation for the pawn, usually in the form of a weak Black queenside and a lead in development. White usually continues 5.Bg2, but 5.Qa4+, regaining the pawn immediately, is a notable sideline.

After 5.Bg2, Black's most common moves is 5...a6, aiming to prepare ...b5 and consolidate the pawn on c4. Alternatives include:

- 5...c5
- 5...c6
- 5...Nc6
- 5...Nbd7
- 5...Bd7
- 5...Bb4+

Also possible is 5...Be7, which reaches what is often called the Classical Line of the Catalan Opening, though it is more often reached via a move order with 4...Be7 to avoid giving White the option of 6.Qa4+.

== Open Catalan with 5...a6 ==
Position: a8 black rook, b8 black knight, c8 black bishop, d8 black queen, e8 black king, f8 black bishop, h8 black rook, b7 black pawn, c7 black pawn, f7 black pawn, g7 black pawn, h7 black pawn, a6 black pawn, e6 black pawn, f6 black knight, c4 black pawn, d4 white pawn, f3 white knight, g3 white pawn, a2 white pawn, b2 white pawn, e2 white pawn, f2 white pawn, g2 white bishop, h2 white pawn, a1 white rook, b1 white knight, c1 white bishop, d1 white queen, e1 white king, h1 white rook

Open Catalan, main line: 5...a6

Position: a8 black rook, d8 black queen, e8 black king, f8 black bishop, h8 black rook, c7 black pawn, d7 black bishop, f7 black pawn, g7 black pawn, h7 black pawn, a6 black pawn, c6 black knight, e6 black pawn, f6 black knight, b5 black pawn, c4 black pawn, d4 white pawn, e3 white pawn, f3 white knight, g3 white pawn, a2 white pawn, b2 white pawn, e2 white queen, f2 white pawn, g2 white bishop, h2 white pawn, a1 white rook, b1 white knight, c1 white bishop, f1 white rook, g1 white king

5...a6 Open Catalan, main line: 6.0-0 Nc6 7.e3 Bd7 8.Qe2 b5

With 5...a6, Black prepares the pawn advance ...b5. The main move for White is 6.0-0. 6.Ne5 is also seen and often met with 6...Bb4+ 7.Nc3 Nd5 or 6...c5. After 6.0-0, Black's usual move is 6...Nc6 (6...b5 is the main alternative), aiming to consolidate with ...Rb8, ...b5, ...Bd7. In many lines, Black keeps a pawn advantage long term. White most often replies 7.e3, followed by 7.Nc3 and 7.Bg5. 7.a4 and 7.Nbd2 have also been played.

=== Main line: 6.0-0 Nc6 7.e3 ===
7.e3 is White's most popular move, intending to play e4 only after preparing it with moves like Qe2, Rfd1, and Nc3. The immediate 7...b5? loses to 8.Ne5 (an example of a discovered attack); Black's two responses are instead 7...Rb8 and 7...Bd7.

7...Bd7 is Black's main choice against 7.e3. After the usual 8.Qe2, Black can respond with 8...Bd6, giving back the pawn to develop. However, the main move is 8...b5, consolidating the extra pawn. White can continue with 9.Nc3, 9.Rd1, or 9.e4, but the main move is 9.b3, letting Black keep the extra pawn permanently after 9...cxb3 10.axb3. To compensate, White has open lines for the rooks.

Against 7...Rb8, White's main move is 8.Nfd2, unblocking the bishop's diagonal, supporting e3–e4, and attacking c4. The main line continues 8...e5 9.Bxc6+ bxc6 10.dxe5 Ng4 11.Nxc4 Be6 12.Nbd2 Bb4 13.b3 h5 with a slight edge for White. 8.Qe2 b5 9.b3 cxb3 10.axb3 is a frequent alternative.

=== 6.0-0 Nc6 7.Nc3 ===
Position: b8 black rook, f8 black rook, g8 black king, b7 black bishop, f7 black pawn, h7 black pawn, a6 black pawn, f6 black pawn, b5 black pawn, c5 black pawn, b4 black knight, c4 black pawn, d4 black pawn, f4 white bishop, f3 white knight, g3 white pawn, a2 white pawn, b2 white pawn, f2 white pawn, g2 white bishop, h2 white pawn, a1 white rook, d1 white rook, g1 white king

Common line in the 7.Nc3 variation: 7...Rb8 8.e4 Be7 9.Qe2 b5 10.Rd1 0-0 11.d5 exd5 12.e5 d4 13.exf6 Bxf6 14.Qe4 Bb7 15.Nd5 Nb4 16.Nxf6+ Qxf6 17.Qf4 c5 18.Qxf6 gxf6 19.Bf4

Although less popular than 7.e3, 7.Nc3 is much more complex and leads to sharper positions. After 7.Nc3, play continues 7...Rb8 8. e4. After which, Black can consolidate their pawn with 8...b5 or focus on their development with 8...Be7 instead. Against 8...b5, play continues 9.d5 (9.Qe2 is an interesting alternative) Nb4 10.b3 cxb3 11.Qxb3 c5 12. dxc6 Nxc6 13. Bf4 Rb7, where White's lead in development and more activity is more valuable than Black's extra pawn. Against 8...Be7, play continues 9.Qe2, sacrificing a second pawn on d4. Black can accept White's gambit with 9...Nxd4, where play continues 10.Nxd4 Qxd4 11.Rd1 Qc5 12.e5 Nd7 13.Ne4 Qb5. White gains sufficient compensation for the two pawns due to piece activity and development. Black can also continue with the plan of consolidating their c4 pawn with 9...b5, and theory continues 10.Rd1 0-0 (10...Nb4 is also seen) 11.d5 exd5 12.e5 d4 13.exf6 Bxf6 14.Qe4 Bb7 15.Nd5 Nb4 16.Nxf6+ Qxf6 17.Qf4 c5 18.Qxf6 gxf6. This leads to a complex endgame where Black has three pawns for a piece.

=== 6.0-0 b5 ===
6...b5 immediately defends the pawn. This leads to a forcing line 7.Ne5 Nd5 8.a4 Bb7 9.c3, after which Black sometimes opts for 9...bxc3, which gives White an advantage due to a lead in development after 10.axb5 axb5 11.Rxa8 Bxa8 12.Qxb3, but Black's main option is 9...c3, leading to the forced line 10.axb5 axb5 11.Rxa8 Bxa8 12.e4 b4 13.exd5 Bxd5. White has a minor piece for two pawns, but the strength of Black's pawns on b4 and c3 give ample compensation.

== Open Catalan with 5...c5 ==
Position: a8 black rook, b8 black knight, c8 black bishop, d8 black queen, e8 black king, f8 black bishop, h8 black rook, a7 black pawn, b7 black pawn, f7 black pawn, g7 black pawn, h7 black pawn, e6 black pawn, f6 black knight, c5 black pawn, c4 black pawn, d4 white pawn, f3 white knight, g3 white pawn, a2 white pawn, b2 white pawn, e2 white pawn, f2 white pawn, g2 white bishop, h2 white pawn, a1 white rook, b1 white knight, c1 white bishop, d1 white queen, e1 white king, h1 white rook

Open Catalan with 5...c5

Position: a8 black rook, c8 black bishop, d8 black queen, e8 black king, f8 black bishop, h8 black rook, a7 black pawn, b7 black pawn, f7 black pawn, g7 black pawn, h7 black pawn, c6 black knight, e6 black pawn, f6 black knight, c5 black pawn, c4 black pawn, d4 white pawn, f3 white knight, g3 white pawn, a2 white pawn, b2 white pawn, e2 white pawn, f2 white pawn, g2 white bishop, h2 white pawn, a1 white rook, b1 white knight, c1 white bishop, d1 white queen, f1 white rook, g1 white king

Position after 5...c5 6.0-0 Nc6

With 5...c5, Black immediately strikes in the centre, aiming to trade the c-pawn for White's d-pawn, nullifying the extra centre pawn advantage that White enjoys in the Open Catalan. This variation has been popular and used with success by top grandmasters, such as Viswanathan Anand. White usually responds with 6.0-0 to gain a lead in development, but 6.Qa4+, immediately regaining the pawn, is a playable sideline.

After 6.0-0, Black usually responds with 6...Nc6 (6...cxd4 is an alternative). White's main replies are 7.Qa4 and 7.dxc5, followed by 7.Ne5 and 7.Na3. After 7.Qa4, intending to take back the pawn, Black's main move is 7...Bd7, but an alternative is 7...cxd4.

=== Main line: 6.0-0 Nc6 7.Qa4 Bd7 ===
Position: a8 black rook, d8 black queen, e8 black king, f8 black bishop, h8 black rook, a7 black pawn, d7 black bishop, f7 black pawn, g7 black pawn, h7 black pawn, c6 black knight, e6 black pawn, f6 black knight, b5 black pawn, c5 black pawn, c4 white queen, d4 white pawn, f3 white knight, g3 white pawn, a2 white pawn, b2 white pawn, e2 white pawn, f2 white pawn, g2 white bishop, h2 white pawn, a1 white rook, b1 white knight, c1 white bishop, f1 white rook, g1 white king

Position after 5...c5 6.0-0 Nc6 7.Qa4 Bd7 8.Qxc4 b5

Position: c8 black rook, d8 black queen, e8 black king, f8 black bishop, h8 black rook, a7 black pawn, d7 black bishop, f7 black pawn, g7 black pawn, h7 black pawn, c6 black knight, e6 black pawn, f6 black knight, b5 black pawn, c4 black pawn, d4 white pawn, e4 white pawn, f3 white knight, g3 white pawn, a2 white pawn, b2 white pawn, c2 white queen, f2 white pawn, g2 white bishop, h2 white pawn, a1 white rook, b1 white knight, c1 white bishop, f1 white rook, g1 white king

Position after 5...c5 6.0-0 Nc6 7.Qa4 Bd7 8.Qxc4 b5 9.Qd3 c4 10.Qc2 Rc8

The main move, 7...Bd7, unpins Black's knight and therefore genuinely threatens the d-pawn. In most cases, White responds with 8.Qxc4 (8.dxc5 is an alternative). Black's main move is 8...b5, with 8...cxd4 being the main alternative. 8...Rc8 and 8...Qb6 are sometimes seen.

After 8...cxd4, Black usually gambits a pawn after 9.Nxd4 Rc8 10.Nc3 Nxd4 (10...Qb6 and 10...Be7 are sidelines) 11.Qxd4 Bc5 12.Qh4 0-0 13.Bxb7 Rb8 14.Bf3 Rb4 15.Qg5 Bd4 16.Qd2 Qc7. Black is down a pawn, but enjoys a lead in development as compensation.

8...b5 is the main move, attacking White's queen. 9.Qxb5? loses the e2-pawn after 9...Nxd4 10.Qc4 Bb5. White therefore retreats with 9.Qd3. Black's options here are to attack the queen and gain space with 9...c4, or develop with 9...Rc8.

After 9...c4, White can choose between 10.Qc2 or 10.Qd1. Against 10.Qd1, Black responds with 10...Rc8, removing the rook from the h1-a8 diagonal. White then has several options: 11.Bf4, 11.Bg5, 11.Ne5, 11.Re1 and 11.b3. Against 10.Qc2, Black can similarly respond with 10...Rc8, but also has the alternative 10...Be7, followed by ...0-0 and ...Na5. In both cases, White will usually play 11.e4, though against 10...Rc8, 11.Nc3, 11.Bg5 and 11.a4 are also possible.

Against 9...Rc8, play continues with 10.dxc5 Bxc5 (not 10...Nb4?! 11.Qb3!) 11.Nc3. Here, Black usually replies with 11...Nb5 and 11...b4. Against 11...Nb5, White can choose between 12.Qd1, leading to a queenless middlegame after 12...Bc6 13.Qxd8+ Rxd8 14.Bg5 0-0, or 12.Qd2. Against 11...b4, White can choose between 12.Ne4 or 12.Nb5. 12.Ne4 continues with 12...Nxe4 13.Qxe3 and now 13...Ne7, preparing ...Bc6 and defending the c5 bishop with the c8 rook. 12.Nb5 continues 12...0-0 and now the key idea 13.Nd6! Against 13...Nd4, White gains an advantage after the forced sequence 14.Bf4 Nd5 15.Ng5! g6 16.Nge4 Nxf4 17.gxf4 Bb6 18.Nxc8 Bb5 19.Qd2 Qxc8 20.e3 Bxf1 21.Rxf1 f5 22.Qxb4. White is a pawn up while Black has insufficient compensation.

=== 6.0-0 Nc6 7.Qa4 cxd4 ===
Position: a8 black rook, e8 black king, f8 black bishop, h8 black rook, a7 black pawn, b7 black pawn, d7 black bishop, f7 black pawn, g7 black pawn, h7 black pawn, c6 white bishop, e6 black pawn, f6 black knight, a4 white queen, c4 black pawn, d4 black queen, g3 white pawn, a2 white pawn, b2 white pawn, e2 white pawn, f2 white pawn, h2 white pawn, a1 white rook, b1 white knight, c1 white bishop, d1 white rook, g1 white king

Position after 5...c5 6.0-0 Nc6 7.Qa4 cxd4 8.Nxd4 Qxd4 9.Bxc6 Bd7 10.Rd1

Position: e8 black king, f8 black bishop, h8 black rook, a7 black pawn, f7 black pawn, g7 black pawn, h7 black pawn, c6 black pawn, e6 black pawn, f6 black knight, c4 white rook, g3 white pawn, a2 white pawn, b2 white pawn, e2 white pawn, f2 white pawn, g2 white king, h2 white pawn, a1 white rook, b1 white knight, c1 white bishop, d1 black rook

Position after 5...c5 6.0-0 Nc6 7.Qa4 cxd4 8.Nxd4 Qxd4 9.Bxc6 Bd7 10.Rd1 Bxc6 11.Qxc6+ bxc6 12.Rxd4 Rd8 13.Rxc4 Rd1+ 14.Kg2

After 7...cxd4, it looks like Black has won another pawn. However, due to White's pressure on c6, White can play 8.Nxd4 anyway. The main line of the variation continues 8...Qxd4 9.Bxc6 Bd7, and then 10.Rd1 (10.Bxd7+?! is weaker; 10...Qxd7 11.Qxc4 Rc8 leads to a good position for Black), where Black can continue with either 10...Bxc6 or 10...Qxd1+, where after 11.Qxd1 Bxc6, Black has a rook, bishop, and pawn in exchange for White's queen, an uncommon material imbalance.

After 10...Bxc6, the main continuation is 11.Qxc6+ bxc6 12.Rxd4 Rd8 (12...c5 is an alternative) 13.Rxc4 Rd1+ 14.Kg2, which results in an endgame where only White has realistic winning chances due to the weakness of Black's queenside structure.

An alternative to 9...Bd7 is the exchange sacrifice 9...bxc6, which was mentioned by Mark Dvoretsky; after 10.Qxc6+ Qd7 11.Qxa8 Bc5. Black hopes to use the strength of the bishops as compensation, but 12.Be3!, trading off the bishop on c5 gives White an advantage.

=== 6.0-0 Nc6: White's 7th move alternatives ===
With 7.dxc5, an endgame is reached after 7...Qxd1 8. Rxd1 Bxc5 9.Nbd2 c3 (Black cannot feasibly defend the c4 pawn due to complications on the h1-a8 diagonal) 10.bxc3 0-0 11.Nb3 Be7.

7.Ne5 is a pawn sacrifice line; after 7...Bd7 8.Na3 cxd4 9.Naxc4 and after 9...Be7 or 9...Bc5, White continues with Qb3, Bf4 and Rac1, seeking compensation with play on the c-file.

7.Na3 is another gambit line after 7...cxd4 8.Nxc4 Bc5 9.c3 a5. White can play 10.Bf4 or go for a queenside fianchetto with 10.b3.

=== 6.0-0 cxd4 ===
After 6...cxd4 7.Nxd4, Black can respond with 7...Qb6, 7...a6 or 7...Bc5.

After 7...Qb6, play continues 8.Qa4+ Bd7 9.Qxc4 and now 9...Na6, intending to follow up with ...Rc8 and ...Nc5. However, after 10.Qb3, White gains the initiative. After 7...a6, play continues 8.Qa4+ Qd7 9.Qxc4 b5 10.Qb3 Bb7 11.Bxb7 Qxb7 12.a4. White can get play on the queenside while Black's king is still on e8. Against 7...Bc5, play continues 8.Qa4+ Qd7 9.Nb5 0-0 10.Qxc4 Qe7 and now the aggressive 11.a4! Bb6 12.a4

== Open Catalan, Classical Line: 5...Be7 ==
Position: a8 black rook, b8 black knight, c8 black bishop, d8 black queen, e8 black king, h8 black rook, a7 black pawn, b7 black pawn, c7 black pawn, e7 black bishop, f7 black pawn, g7 black pawn, h7 black pawn, e6 black pawn, f6 black knight, c4 black pawn, d4 white pawn, f3 white knight, g3 white pawn, a2 white pawn, b2 white pawn, e2 white pawn, f2 white pawn, g2 white bishop, h2 white pawn, a1 white rook, b1 white knight, c1 white bishop, d1 white queen, e1 white king, h1 white rook

Open Catalan, Classical Line: 5...Be7

The Open Catalan, Classical Line (ECO code E05) consists of the moves 1.d4 Nf6 2.c4 e6 3.g3 d5 4.Bg2 dxc4 5.Nf3 Be7. White sacrifices the pawn for a lead in development. Without a black pawn on d5, White's kingside bishop hinders Black's queenside development. The Open Catalan line has been a favourite of Anatoly Karpov and Efim Geller as Black and of Oleg Romanishin as White. Usually, White will recover the pawn with Qc2 and then a4, Ne5, or Qa4+. In order to hold the pawn, Black will have to seriously weaken the queenside with ...a6 and ...b5.

== Closed Catalan ==
- 4...c6
- 4...g6
- 4...Bd6
- 4...Nbd7

== Notable games ==
- Kramnik vs. Anand, Wijk aan Zee 2007
  1.d4 Nf6 2.c4 e6 3.g3 d5 4.Bg2 Be7 5.Nf3 0-0 6.0-0 dxc4 7.Qc2 a6 8.Qxc4 b5 9.Qc2 Bb7 10.Bd2 Ra7 11.Rc1 Be4 12.Qb3 Nc6 13.e3 Qa8 14.Qd1 Nb8 15.Ba5 Rc8 16.a3 Bd6 17.Nbd2 Bd5 18.Qf1 Nbd7 19.b4 e5 20.dxe5 Bxe5 21.Nxe5 Nxe5 22.f3 Nc4 23.Nxc4 Bxc4 24.Qf2 Re8 25.e4 c6 26.Rd1 Rd7 27.Rxd7 Nxd7 28.Rd1 Qb7 29.Rd6 f6 30.f4 Re6 31.Rd2 Re7 32.Qd4 Nf8 33.Qd8 Rd7 34.Rxd7 Qxd7 35.Qxd7 Nxd7 36.e5 fxe5 37.Bxc6 Nf6 38.Bb7 exf4 39.gxf4 Nd5 40.Kf2 Nxf4 41.Ke3 g5 42.Bxa6 Kf7 43.a4 Ke7 44.Bxb5 Bxb5 45.axb5 Kd7 46.Ke4 Ne2 47.Bb6 g4 48.Bf2 Nc3 49.Kf5 Nxb5 50.Kxg4 Ke6 51.Kg5 Kf7 52.Kf5 Ke7 53.Bc5 1–0
- Anand vs. Topalov, World Chess Championship 2010 game 4
  1.d4 Nf6 2.c4 e6 3.Nf3 d5 4.g3 dxc4 5.Bg2 Bb4+ 6.Bd2 a5 7.Qc2 Bxd2+ 8.Qxd2!? c6 9.a4 b5 10.Na3! Bd7 11.Ne5 Nd5 12.e4! Nb4 13.0-0 0-0 14.Rfd1 Be8 15.d5! Qd6 16.Ng4 Qc5 17.Ne3 N8a6?! 18.dxc6 bxa4 19.Naxc4 Bxc6 20.Rac1 h6?! 21.Nd6 Qa7? 22.Ng4! Rad8 23.Nxh6+!! gxh6 24.Qxh6 f6 25.e5! Bxg2 26.exf6! Rxd6 27.Rxd6 Be4 28.Rxe6 Nd3 29.Rc2! Qh7 30.f7+! Qxf7 31.Rxe4 Qf5 32.Re7 1–0

== ECO codes ==
The Encyclopaedia of Chess Openings classifies the Catalan Opening under codes E00 to E09 according to the below scheme.

- E00: 1.d4 Nf6 2.c4 e6
- E01: 1.d4 Nf6 2.c4 e6 3.g3 d5
- E02: 1.d4 Nf6 2.c4 e6 3.g3 d5 4.Bg2 dxc4
- E03: 1.d4 Nf6 2.c4 e6 3.g3 d5 4.Bg2 dxc4 5.Qa4+ Nbd7 6.Qxc4
- E04: 1.d4 Nf6 2.c4 e6 3.g3 d5 4.Bg2 dxc4 5.Nf3
- E05: 1.d4 Nf6 2.c4 e6 3.g3 d5 4.Bg2 dxc4 5.Nf3 Be7
- E06: 1.d4 Nf6 2.c4 e6 3.g3 d5 4.Bg2 Be7
- E07: 1.d4 Nf6 2.c4 e6 3.g3 d5 4.Bg2 Be7 5.Nf3 0-0 6.0-0 Nbd7
- E08: 1.d4 Nf6 2.c4 e6 3.g3 d5 4.Bg2 Be7 5.Nf3 0-0 6.0-0 Nbd7 7.Qc2
- E09: 1.d4 Nf6 2.c4 e6 3.g3 d5 4.Bg2 Be7 5.Nf3 0-0 6.0-0 Nbd7 7.Qc2 c6 8.Nbd2

== See also ==
- List of chess openings
- List of chess openings named after places
