= Transposition (chess) =

Reaching a chess position via an alternative sequence of moves

In chess, a transposition is a sequence of moves that results in a position that may also be reached by another, more common sequence of moves. Transpositions are particularly common in the opening, where a given position may be reached by different sequences of moves. Players sometimes use transpositions deliberately, to avoid variations they dislike, lure opponents into unfamiliar or uncomfortable territory or simply to worry opponents. To transpose is to play a move that results in a transposition.

Transposition tables are an essential part of a computer chess program.

Transpositions exist in other abstract strategy games such as shogi, Go, tic-tac-toe and Hex.

== Examples ==
=== Positions reached by different routes ===
Position: a8 black rook, b8 black knight, c8 black bishop, d8 black queen, e8 black king, f8 black bishop, h8 black rook, a7 black pawn, b7 black pawn, c7 black pawn, f7 black pawn, g7 black pawn, h7 black pawn, e6 black pawn, f6 black knight, d5 black pawn, c4 white pawn, d4 white pawn, c3 white knight, a2 white pawn, b2 white pawn, e2 white pawn, f2 white pawn, g2 white pawn, h2 white pawn, a1 white rook, c1 white bishop, d1 white queen, e1 white king, f1 white bishop, g1 white knight, h1 white rook

Position can arise from Queen's Gambit or English Opening.

For instance, the first position can be obtained from the Queen's Gambit:

1. d4 d5
2. c4 e6
3. Nc3 Nf6

But this position can also be reached from the English Opening:

1. c4 e6
2. Nc3 Nf6
3. d4 d5

so the English Opening has transposed into the Queen's Gambit.

Position: a8 black rook, b8 black knight, c8 black bishop, d8 black queen, e8 black king, f8 black bishop, h8 black rook, a7 black pawn, b7 black pawn, c7 black pawn, f7 black pawn, g7 black pawn, h7 black pawn, f6 black knight, d5 black pawn, d4 white pawn, f3 white knight, a2 white pawn, b2 white pawn, c2 white pawn, f2 white pawn, g2 white pawn, h2 white pawn, a1 white rook, b1 white knight, c1 white bishop, d1 white queen, e1 white king, f1 white bishop, h1 white rook

Position can arise from French Defense or Petrov Defense.

The second position shows another example. The position can arise from the French Defense:

1. e4 e6
2. d4 d5
3. exd5 exd5
4. Nf3 Nf6

The identical position can also be reached, with two extra moves played by each side, from the Petrov Defense:

1. e4 e5
2. Nf3 Nf6
3. Nxe5 d6
4. Nf3 Nxe4
5. d3 Nf6
6. d4 d5

Position: a8 black rook, b8 black knight, c8 black bishop, d8 black queen, e8 black king, h8 black rook, a7 black pawn, b7 black pawn, c7 black pawn, f7 black pawn, g7 black pawn, f6 black knight, h6 black pawn, d5 black pawn, g5 white bishop, b4 black bishop, d4 white pawn, c3 white knight, a2 white pawn, b2 white pawn, c2 white queen, e2 white pawn, f2 white pawn, g2 white pawn, h2 white pawn, a1 white rook, e1 white king, f1 white bishop, g1 white knight, h1 white rook

Position can arise from Queen's Gambit Declined or Nimzo-Indian Defense.

This third position shows another example. This position can be reached from the Exchange variation of the Queen's Gambit Declined:

1. d4 d5
2. c4 e6
3. Nc3 Nf6
4. cxd5 exd5
5. Bg5 Bb4
6. Qc2 h6

The identical position can also be reached from the Classical variation of the Nimzo-Indian Defense:

1. d4 Nf6
2. c4 e6
3. Nc3 Bb4
4. Qc2 d5
5. cxd5 exd5
6. Bg5 h6

=== Transposition possibilities of some openings ===
Some openings are noted for their wide range of possible transpositions, for example the Catalan Opening and Sicilian Defense.

For a simple example, the opening moves 1.d4 e6 (the Horwitz Defense) can transpose very quickly into a wide range of openings, including:

Position: a8 black rook, b8 black knight, c8 black bishop, d8 black queen, e8 black king, f8 black bishop, g8 black knight, h8 black rook, a7 black pawn, b7 black pawn, c7 black pawn, f7 black pawn, g7 black pawn, h7 black pawn, e6 black pawn, d5 black pawn, c4 white pawn, d4 white pawn, a2 white pawn, b2 white pawn, e2 white pawn, f2 white pawn, g2 white pawn, h2 white pawn, a1 white rook, b1 white knight, c1 white bishop, d1 white queen, e1 white king, f1 white bishop, g1 white knight, h1 white rook

Queen's Gambit Declined, after 2.c4 d5. The QGD itself offers a wide range of transpositional possibilities.

Position: a8 black rook, b8 black knight, c8 black bishop, d8 black queen, e8 black king, f8 black bishop, h8 black rook, a7 black pawn, b7 black pawn, c7 black pawn, d7 black pawn, f7 black pawn, g7 black pawn, h7 black pawn, e6 black pawn, f6 black knight, c4 white pawn, d4 white pawn, a2 white pawn, b2 white pawn, e2 white pawn, f2 white pawn, g2 white pawn, h2 white pawn, a1 white rook, b1 white knight, c1 white bishop, d1 white queen, e1 white king, f1 white bishop, g1 white knight, h1 white rook

After 2.c4 Nf6. This could develop in many ways, including: Queen's Gambit Declined, Nimzo-Indian Defense, Queen's Indian Defense or Modern Benoni Defense.

Position: a8 black rook, b8 black knight, c8 black bishop, d8 black queen, e8 black king, f8 black bishop, g8 black knight, h8 black rook, a7 black pawn, b7 black pawn, c7 black pawn, d7 black pawn, g7 black pawn, h7 black pawn, e6 black pawn, f5 black pawn, c4 white pawn, d4 white pawn, a2 white pawn, b2 white pawn, e2 white pawn, f2 white pawn, g2 white pawn, h2 white pawn, a1 white rook, b1 white knight, c1 white bishop, d1 white queen, e1 white king, f1 white bishop, g1 white knight, h1 white rook

Dutch Defense, after 2.c4 f5

Position: a8 black rook, b8 black knight, c8 black bishop, d8 black queen, e8 black king, f8 black bishop, g8 black knight, h8 black rook, a7 black pawn, c7 black pawn, d7 black pawn, f7 black pawn, g7 black pawn, h7 black pawn, b6 black pawn, e6 black pawn, c4 white pawn, d4 white pawn, a2 white pawn, b2 white pawn, e2 white pawn, f2 white pawn, g2 white pawn, h2 white pawn, a1 white rook, b1 white knight, c1 white bishop, d1 white queen, e1 white king, f1 white bishop, g1 white knight, h1 white rook

English Defense, after 2.c4 b6

Position: a8 black rook, b8 black knight, c8 black bishop, d8 black queen, e8 black king, f8 black bishop, g8 black knight, h8 black rook, a7 black pawn, b7 black pawn, c7 black pawn, f7 black pawn, g7 black pawn, h7 black pawn, e6 black pawn, d5 black pawn, d4 white pawn, e4 white pawn, a2 white pawn, b2 white pawn, c2 white pawn, f2 white pawn, g2 white pawn, h2 white pawn, a1 white rook, b1 white knight, c1 white bishop, d1 white queen, e1 white king, f1 white bishop, g1 white knight, h1 white rook

French Defense, after 2.e4 d5

Position: a8 black rook, b8 black knight, c8 black bishop, d8 black queen, e8 black king, f8 black bishop, g8 black knight, h8 black rook, a7 black pawn, b7 black pawn, d7 black pawn, f7 black pawn, g7 black pawn, h7 black pawn, e6 black pawn, c5 black pawn, d4 white pawn, e4 white pawn, a2 white pawn, b2 white pawn, c2 white pawn, f2 white pawn, g2 white pawn, h2 white pawn, a1 white rook, b1 white knight, c1 white bishop, d1 white queen, e1 white king, f1 white bishop, g1 white knight, h1 white rook

Franco-Benoni, after 2.e4 c5. This can transpose into various types of Benoni Defense after 3.d5, into the Alapin Variation of the Sicilian Defense after 3.c3, or into main lines of the Sicilian Defense after 3.Nf3 cxd4 4.Nxd4.
