= Sergey Urusov =

Sergey Urusov may refer to:

- Sergey Semyonovich Urusov (1827–1897), Russian chess player
- Sergey Dmitriyevich Urusov (1862–1937), Russian politician

== See also ==
- Urusov
