= Christian Seel =

German chess player

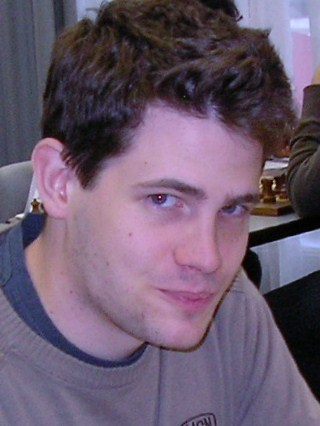
- Christian Seel, Bonn 2011

Personal information
- Born: 28 December 1983 (age 42) Troisdorf

Chess career
- Country: Germany
- Title: International Master (2004)
- FIDE rating: 2474 (July 2026)
- Peak rating: 2500 (April 2006)

Christian Seel (born 28 December 1983) in Troisdorf) is a German player of chess and shogi, and an academic specializing in economics and game theory.

== Academic career ==
Seel has a Ph.D. from the University of Bonn, and is a professor in the Department of Microeconomics and Public Economics at Maastricht University, where his research involves game theory and bounded rationality.

== Shogi ==
In shogi, Seel placed third in the 2012 German open championship, winning 2nd Dan.

== Chess ==
Seel has been an International Master (IM) in chess since 2004. In the Chess Bundesliga, he plays first board for the SK Aachen team.

He is the author of a chess opening book on the Antoshin variation of the Philidor Defence (1.e4 e5 2.Nf3 d6 3.d4 exd4 4.Nxd4 Nf6 5.Nc3 Be7). Originally in German, entitled Geheimwaffe Philidor (Chessgate, 2005), it has been translated into English as The Philidor: A Secret Weapon (Chessgate, 2007).
