= Jaenisch =

Jaenisch is a surname. Notable people with the surname include:

- Carl Jaenisch (1813–1872), Finnish and Russian chess player
- Rudolf Jaenisch (born 1942), German cell biologist
