= Russian defence =

Russian Defence may refer to:

- Ruy Lopez § Steinitz Defence Deferred
- Petrov's Defence (Russische Verteidigung)

== See also ==
- Ministry of Defence (Russia)
