= Sofya Urusova =

Russian lady-in-waiting and favourite of Nicholas I

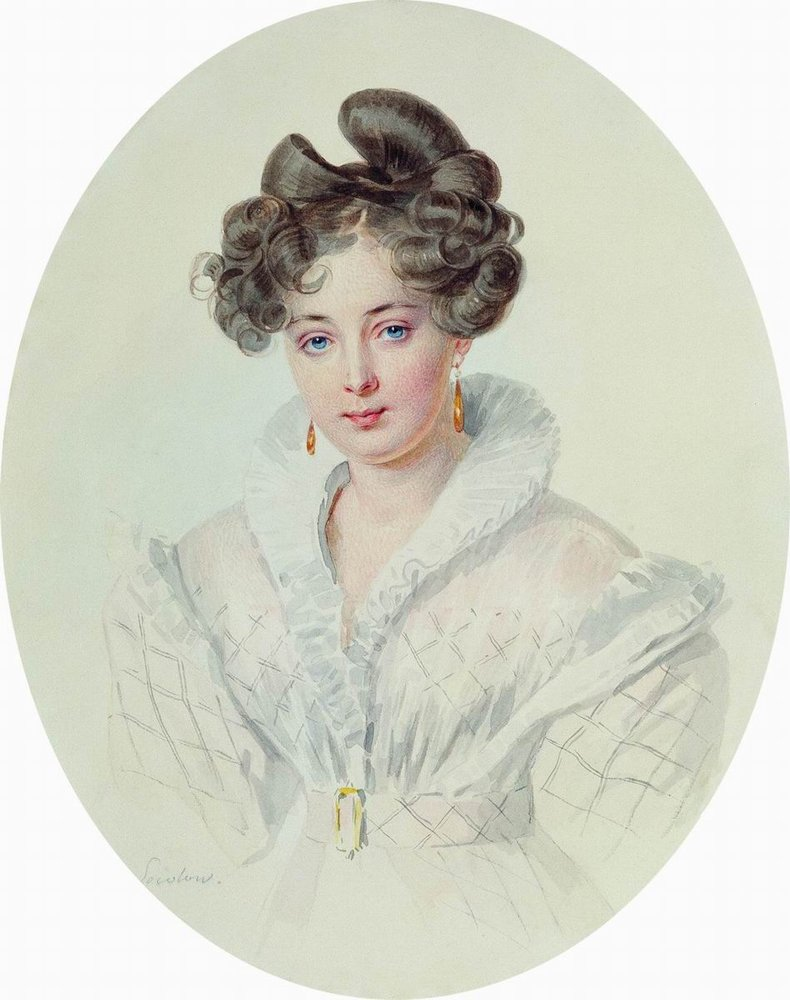
Sofya Urusova. Painting by Pyotr Sokolov, 1827.

Princess Sofya Aleksandrovna Urusova (Russian: Софья Александровна Урусова; April 6, 1804 – July 17, 1889) was a Russian lady-in-waiting and the favourite of Nicholas I.

== Biography ==
By birth a member of the house of Urusov, Sofya Alexandrovna was born in Moscow, as the daughter of Ober-Hofmeister Prince Alexander Mikhailovich Urusov (1766–1853) and his wife, Ekaterina Petrovna Tatishcheva (1775–1855), who was the sister of diplomat Dmitry Pavlovich Tatishchev.

She served as maid of honour to the empress between 1827 and 1833, and was the reputed lover of the emperor during that period.

In 1833 she married prince Leon Hieronim Radziwiłł.

At one point she became an acquaintance of Anne Lister.
