= Alexander Petrov (chess player) =

Russian chess player (1794–1867)

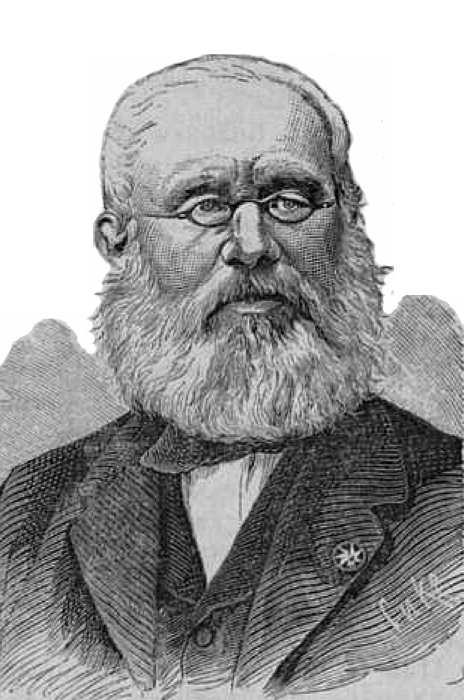
Portrait by Pyotr Borel, 1871

Alexander Dmitrievich Petrov (Russian: Алекса́ндр Дми́триевич Петро́в; February 12, 1794 – April 22, 1867) was a Russian chess player, chess composer, and chess writer.

== Biography ==
Petrov was born in Biserovo (now part of Opochka in Pskov Oblast) into a noble family and is usually remembered as the first great Russian chess master. From 1804, he lived in St. Petersburg. In 1809, he defeated Baranov, while in 1814 he defeated Kopev, likely St. Petersburg's two leading chess players, and became the best Russian player at the age of 15. For over half a century, Petrov was considered Russia's strongest player.

He is an author of the first chess handbook in Russian (Shakhmatnaya igra [...], St Petersburg, 1824). He also analysed with Carl Jaenisch the opening that later became known as the Petrov's Defense or Russian Game (ECO C42).

From 1840, he lived in Warsaw (then in the Russian Empire), where he successfully played against top Warsaw chess masters: Alexander Hoffman, Piotrowski, Szymański, Siewieluński, Hieronim Czarnowski, Szymon Winawer, and others.

Petrov won matches against D. A. Baranov (4–2) in 1809, Carl Jaenisch (2–1) at St. Petersburg in 1844; Prince Sergey Semenovich Urusov (3–1) at St. Petersburg in 1853 and (13½–7½) at Warsaw in 1859; and Ilya Shumov (4–2) at St. Petersburg in 1862.

During the January Uprising (1863–1864), he left Warsaw for Vienna and Paris. Among others, he played a match with Paul Journoud at Paris in 1863.

"The Retreat of Napoleon I from Moscow" (Petrov, 1824)

Position: d8 black knight, c7 black pawn, g7 black pawn, e6 black pawn, f6 black rook, g6 white bishop, a5 black knight, c5 white pawn, a4 black pawn, d4 white pawn, f4 black rook, g4 black pawn, e3 black bishop, b2 black pawn, c2 white pawn, e2 white knight, f2 black pawn, h2 white king, b1 black king, f1 white knight, h1 white queen

A few moves before checkmate (White to move)

He was an original chess thinker, not afraid to disagree with the ideas of Philidor, the dominant chess figure of his time. Petrov's most well-known problem is "The Retreat of Napoleon I from Moscow" (St. Petersburg, 1824).

Petrov died in Warsaw in 1867, and was buried in the Orthodox Cemetery in Warsaw.

== Notable games ==
- Alexander Hoffman vs. Alexander Petrov, Warsaw m 1844, Italian Game, Classical Variation, Center Attack (C53), 0–1 Petrov's Immortal
- Alexander Petrov vs. Carl Friedrich von Jaenisch, St Petersburg 1844, Russian Game, Modern Attack, Center Variation (C43), 1–0
- Alexander Petrov vs. Prince Dmitri Semenovich Urusov, Paris 1852, Italian Game, Classical Variation, Albin Gambit (C53), 1–0
- Alexander Petrov vs. Prince Sergey Semenovich Urusov, St Petersburg 1853, Italian Game, Classical Variation, Albin Gambit (C53), 1–0
- Alexander Petrov vs. Szymański, Warsaw 1853, French Defense, Exchange, Monte Carlo Variation (C01), 1–0
