= Bessarabia electoral district =

Constituency of the Russian Republic

Bessarabia
- Former Civilian constituency for the All-Russian Constituent Assembly
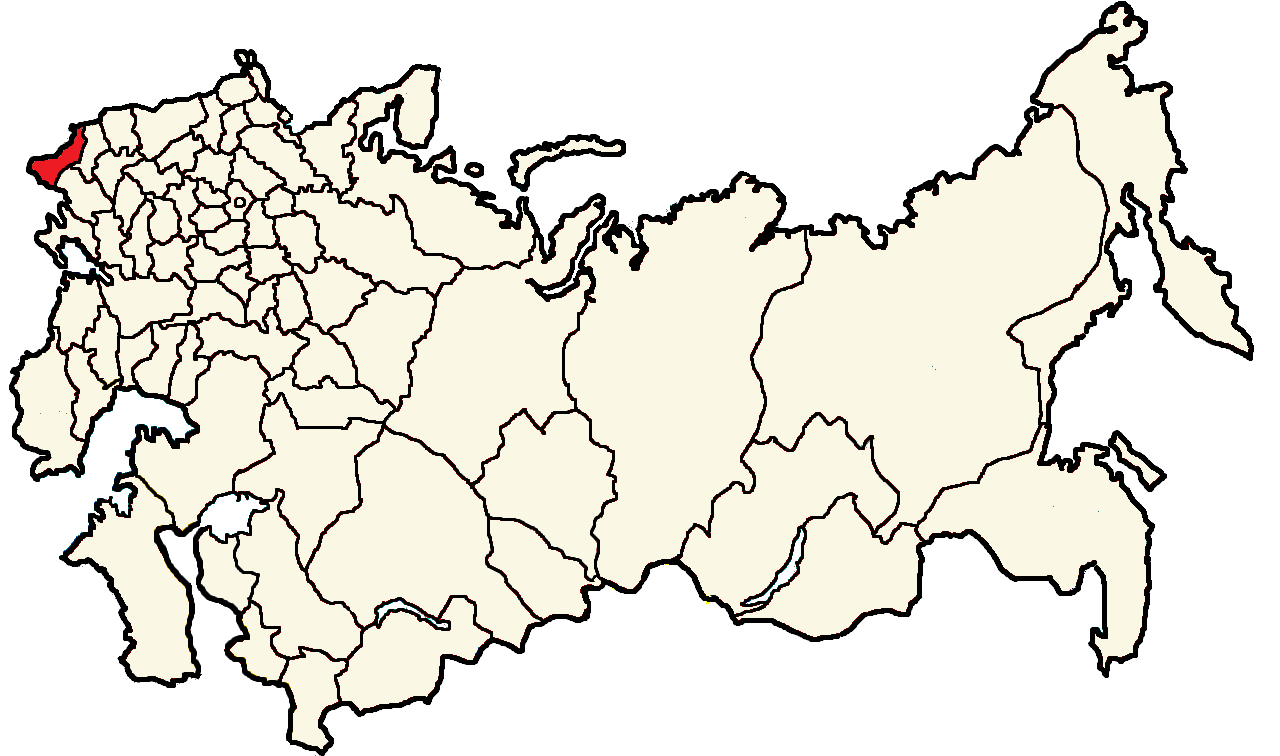

Former constituency
- Created: 1917
- Abolished: 1918
- Number of members: 13
- Number of Uyezd Electoral Commissions: 8
- Number of Urban Electoral Commissions: 2
- Number of Parishes: 225

The Bessarabia electoral district (Russian: Бессарабский избирательный округ) was a constituency created for the 1917 Russian Constituent Assembly election.

The electoral district covered the Bessarabia Governorate. Oliver Radkey's account is substantially incomplete. According to Radkey, only the results from Chișinău and 3 out of 8 uezds could be gathered by scholars. The 5 uezds left out of the count were more populous. Two other sets have been published: one by Moldovan historian Gheorghe Cojocaru, providing a detailed account of the civilian votes, covering almost two thirds of the ones cast in Bessarabia, and a reportedly complete set provided by Soviet author G. Ustinov. 17 lists were in the fray in Bessarabia. The demographics of the district were divided between Romanians (48%), Ukrainians (20%) and Russians (8%). Among the elected deputies, SR deputies were Jewish or Russian, while the peasant soviet deputies, who were in favor of Bessarabia's autonomy, were Romanian.

== Results ==
Bessarabia
Party	Vote (Radkey)	% (Radkey)	% (Rus)
List 2 - Socialist-Revolutionaries	85,349	33.63	31.6
List 1 - Soviet of Peasants' Deputies	69,085	27.22	35.3
List 9 - Jewish National Electoral Committee	28,785	11.34	10.2
List 8 - Bolsheviks- Menshevik-Internationalists	25,569	10.07	8.2
List 5 - Kadets	16,545	6.52	n/a
List 6 - Moldovan National Party and the Bessarabian Union of Credit and Savings Associations	6,643	2.62	2.1
List 3 - Union of Landowners	5,246	2.07	n/a
List 11- Ukrainian Socialist Organizations	4,241	1.67	4.1
List 4 - Bund-Mensheviks	1,438	0.57	n/a
List 10 - Bessarabian Popular Socialist Labour Party	376	0.15	n/a
List 7 - Socialist Party of the Workers of the South-East Railway	?		n/a
List 12 - Union of Citizens of German Nationality	?		n/a
List 13 - Cooperative Group	?		n/a
List 14 - 3rd section of the Telitsky volost of Bendery uezd	?		n/a
List 15 - Inhabitants of Telitsky volost	?		n/a
List 16 - 4th section of the Telitsky volost	?		n/a
List 17 - Poalei Zion	?		n/a
Unaccounted	10,536	4.15	n/a
Total:	253,813		n/a

Deputies Elected
Cojocari	Peasants Soviets
Erhan	Peasants Soviets
Inculet	Peasants Soviets
Katoros	Peasants Soviets
Rudev	Peasants Soviets
Aleksandrov	SR
Imas	SR
Slonim	SR
Sukhovikh	SR
Sukhovikh	SR
Avilov	Bolsheviks/Menshevik-Internationalists
Urusov	Kadet

According to Gheorghe Cojocaru, out of 401,230 votes, the Soviet of Peasants' Deputies obtained 147,200 votes (36.7%), the Socialist Revolutionaries 125,098 votes (31.2%), the Jewish National Electoral Committee 42,506 votes (10.6%), the Bolsheviks and Menshevik Internationalists 27,722 (6.9%), the Moldovan National Party and the Bessarabian Union of Credit and Savings Associations 8,816 votes (2.2%), the Ukrainian Socialist Organizations 16,210 (4%), the Kadets 18,073 votes (4.5% of the votes), the Union of Landowners 6,022 votes (1.5%), the Bund/Mensheviks 3,388 votes (0.8%), the Bessarabian Popular Socialist Labour Party 1,206 votes (0.3%), the Socialist Party of the Workers of the South-East Railway 488 votes (0.1%), the Union of Citizens of German Nationality votes 1670 (0.4%), the Cooperative Group 2,518 votes (0.6%), the 3rd section of the Telitsky volost of Bendery uezd 29 votes (0%), inhabitants of Telitsky volost 20 votes (0%), the 4th section of the Telitsky volost 30 votes (0.0%), and Poalei Zion 1,629 votes (0.4%).

As per Victor Serge, some 600,000 people took part in the vote, with the Peasant soviet obtaining some 200,000 votes, SRs 229,000 votes, Jewish national list 60,000, Kadets 40,000 and the Moldavian National Party 14,000.

In Chișinău city the Jewish National Electoral Committee got 9,054 votes (31.3%), SRs got 5,617 votes (19.4%), the Bolsheviks 5,449 votes (18.8%), the Kadets 3,024 votes (10.5%), the Union of Landowners 1,956 votes (6.8%), the Menshevik-Bund alliance 1,441 votes (5%), the Ukrainian list 1,088 votes (3.8%), the peasants list 472 votes (1.6%), the Moldovan National Party 407 votes (1.4%), the Popular Socialists 276 votes (0.9%), Poalei Zion 51 votes (0.2%), the German list 47 votes (0.2%), the Socialist Party of the Railway Workers 33 votes (0.1%), the cooperative list 11 votes and 16 votes for the remaining 3 lists. Some 12,000 votes were cast in the Chișinău garrison (60% voter turnout); The Internationalist list got 4,859 votes, the SRs 4,689 votes, 845 for the Ukrainian socialists and 704 for the Kadets.
