= Semi-Italian Opening =

Chess opening

Position: a8 black rook, c8 black bishop, d8 black queen, e8 black king, f8 black bishop, g8 black knight, h8 black rook, a7 black pawn, b7 black pawn, c7 black pawn, f7 black pawn, g7 black pawn, h7 black pawn, c6 black knight, d6 black pawn, e5 black pawn, c4 white bishop, e4 white pawn, f3 white knight, a2 white pawn, b2 white pawn, c2 white pawn, d2 white pawn, f2 white pawn, g2 white pawn, h2 white pawn, a1 white rook, b1 white knight, c1 white bishop, d1 white queen, e1 white king, h1 white rook
- Moves: 1.e4 e5 2.Nf3 Nc6 3.Bc4 d6
- ECO: C50
- Named after: Italian Game
- Parent: Italian Game
- Synonyms: Half Giuoco Piano; Lesser Giuoco Piano; Paris Defence

The Semi-Italian Opening (also known as Half Giuoco Piano, Lesser Giuoco Piano, and Paris Defence) is a chess opening characterised by the moves:

1. e4 e5
2. Nf3 Nc6
3. Bc4 d6

It is an uncommon response to the Italian Game (3.Bc4). Black's intent is to play a Hungarian Defence with an early ...Bg4, fighting for control of the d4-square. The line was tried by Alexander Alekhine early in his career. I. A. Horowitz called the defence "solid", also writing: "It does not seem quite sufficient for equality."

The Semi-Italian may also be reached via the Philidor Defence after 1.e4 e5 2.Nf3 d6 3.Bc4 Nc6. The Semi-Italian is included in the Encyclopaedia of Chess Openings code C50, which covers replies to 1.e4 e5 2.Nf3 Nc6 3.Bc4 other than 3...Bc5 and 3...Nf6.

== Lines ==
=== Main line: 4.c3 ===
- 4...Bg4 5.d4 (better than 5.Qb3 as in the Rodzynski–Alekhine game below) Qe7 6.Be3 Nf6 7.Qb3 Nd8 8.Nbd2 g6 9.dxe5 and White was slightly better in Grigory Levenfish–Alexander Tolush, Leningrad 1939.
- 4...Qe7 5.d4 g6 or 5.0-0 g6 is satisfactory for Black (Alekhine).
- 4...Be6 is preferred by Savielly Tartakower.

=== 4.d4 Bg4 ===
After 4...exd4 5.Nxd4 Nf6 6.Nc3 White has the freer game according to Paul Keres, and instead of 5...Nf6, Larry Evans has suggested 5...g6!? The move 4...Be7 transposes to the Hungarian Defence.

- 5.c3 and now:
  - 5...Qd7 and White has some space advantage after either 6.d5 or 6.Bb5 (Keres), or 6.Be3 (Evans).
  - 5...Nf6 6.Qb3 with a clear advantage for White (Keres).
  - 5...Qf6 6.Be3 Bxf3 7.Qxf3 with some advantage for White (Keres).
  - 5...Qe7 transposes to the main line.
- 5.h3! and White is slightly better, for example 5...Bxf3 6.Qxf3 and now:
  - 6...Nf6 7.d5 (Unzicker).
  - 6...Qf6 7.Qb3 Nd8 8.dxe5 dxe5 9.Be3 Bd6 10.Nc3 Ne7 11.Nb5 a6 12.Nxd6 Qxd6 13.0-0 Qc6 14.f4! and White had the attack in Viktor Gavrikov–Evgeny Vladimirov, USSR 1978 (Unzicker).

=== 4.h3 ===
White prevents Black's thematic ...Bg4. The move 4.h3 leads to lines similar to the Hungarian Defence, for example 4...Be7 5.d4 and now:

- 5...Nf6 6.d5 Nb8 7.Bd3 0-0 8.Be3 a5 9.g4!? (Keres preferred 9.c4) Na6 10.Qd2 c6 11.c4 Nd7 12.Nc3 Ndc5 leading to a sharp game with balanced chances in Viktor Kupreichik–Podgayets, USSR 1970.
- 5...Nxd4 6.Nxd4 exd4 7.Qh5 g6 8.Qd5 Be6 9.Qxb7 Nf6 10.Bxe6 fxe6 11.Qc6+ Kf7 12.Nd2 Qd7 13.Qc4 c5 14.0-0 d5 (Gyula Sax–Borislav Ivkov, Amsterdam 1976) with an even game (Unzicker).

=== 4.Nc3 ===
This transposes to the game Maslov–Anatoly Lutikov, USSR 1963, which continued 4...Bg4 5.h3 Bxf3 6.Qxf3 Nf6 7.Ne2 (or 7.d3) and White stands slightly better (Keres, Filip). For 5...Bh5?, see Légal Trap.

== Rodzinski vs. Alekhine, Paris 1913 ==
Position: a8 white queen, f8 black bishop, h8 black rook, a7 black pawn, c7 black pawn, d7 black king, g7 black pawn, h7 black pawn, c6 black knight, d6 black pawn, e5 black pawn, c4 black queen, e4 white pawn, g4 black bishop, c3 white pawn, f3 white pawn, a2 white pawn, b2 white pawn, d2 white pawn, g2 white pawn, h2 white pawn, a1 white rook, b1 white knight, c1 white bishop, e1 white king, h1 white rook

Position after 11.f3

1. e4 e5 2. Nf3 Nc6 3. Bc4 d6 4. c3 Bg4 5. Qb3 Qd7 6. Ng5

6.Bxf7+ Qxf7 7.Qxb7 Kd7 8.Qxa8 Bxf3 9.gxf3 Qxf3 10.Rg1 Qxe4+ 11.Kd1 Qf3+ 12.Ke1 Qe4+ with perpetual check (Alekhine).

6... Nh6 7. Nxf7 Nxf7 8. Bxf7+ Qxf7 9. Qxb7 Kd7 10. Qxa8 Qc4 11. f3 (diagram) Bxf3! 12. gxf3 Nd4 13. d3?

13.cxd4 Qxc1+ with clear advantage for Black.

13... Qxd3 14. cxd4 Be7 15. Qxh8 Bh4# 0–1

== See also ==
- List of chess openings
- List of chess openings named after places
