= Queen's Gambit Declined, Elephant Trap =

Chess opening trap

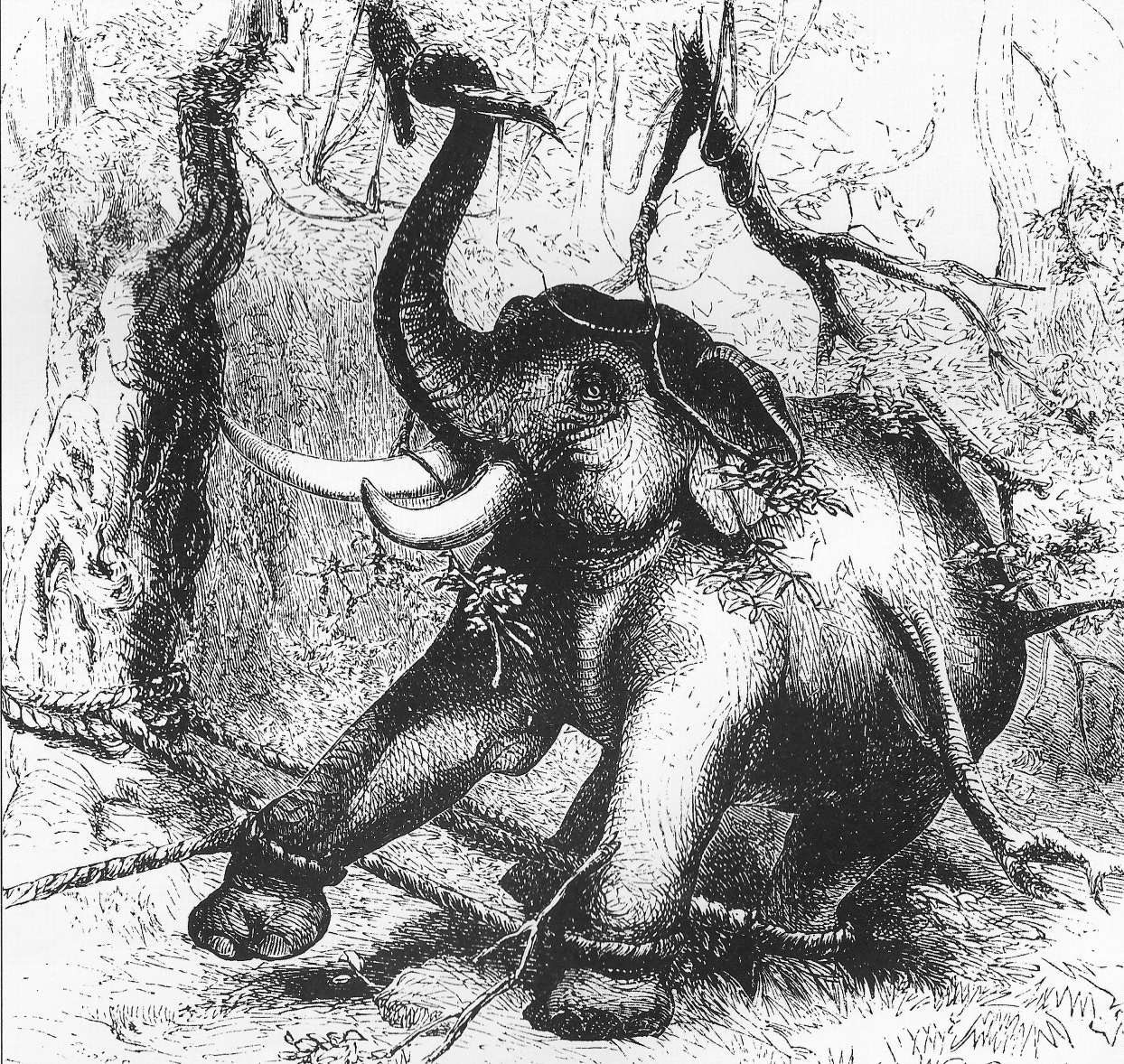

In chess, the Elephant Trap is a faulty attempt by White to win a pawn in a popular variation of the Queen's Gambit Declined.

The earliest recorded occurrence of the trap seems to be the game Karl Mayet–Daniel Harrwitz, Berlin 1848.

== The trap ==
1. d4 d5 2. c4 e6 3. Nc3 Nf6 4. Bg5 Nbd7

This opening sequence usually indicates that Black intends to play the Cambridge Springs Defense with 5.Nf3 c6 6.e3 Qa5, but it can also lead to the Orthodox Defense if Black plays ...Be7. (The Cambridge Springs had not yet been invented at the time of the Mayet–Harrwitz game.)
Black has set a trap; if White tries to win a pawn by ...

Position: a8 black rook, c8 black bishop, d8 black queen, e8 black king, f8 black bishop, h8 black rook, a7 black pawn, b7 black pawn, c7 black pawn, d7 black knight, f7 black pawn, g7 black pawn, h7 black pawn, f6 black knight, d5 white knight, g5 white bishop, d4 white pawn, a2 white pawn, b2 white pawn, e2 white pawn, f2 white pawn, g2 white pawn, h2 white pawn, a1 white rook, d1 white queen, e1 white king, f1 white bishop, g1 white knight, h1 white rook

Position after 6.Nxd5??

Position: a8 black rook, c8 black bishop, d8 white bishop, e8 black king, h8 black rook, a7 black pawn, b7 black pawn, c7 black pawn, d7 black knight, f7 black pawn, g7 black pawn, h7 black pawn, d5 black knight, b4 black bishop, d4 white pawn, a2 white pawn, b2 white pawn, e2 white pawn, f2 white pawn, g2 white pawn, h2 white pawn, a1 white rook, d1 white queen, e1 white king, f1 white bishop, g1 white knight, h1 white rook

Position after 7...Bb4+

5. cxd5 exd5 6. Nxd5?? (first diagram)

White thinks that, because the black knight on f6 is pinned to the queen, it cannot be moved.

6... Nxd5! 7. Bxd8 Bb4+ (second diagram)

Black regains the queen as White has only one legal move to get out of check.

8. Qd2 Bxd2+

Harrwitz played the equally good 8...Kxd8, intending 9...Bxd2+.

9. Kxd2 Kxd8

Black comes out a minor piece ahead.

== See also ==
- Légal Trap

== Bibliography ==
- Barden, Leonard (1987). Play Better Chess • Revised Edition. Treasure Press. p. 24. ISBN 978-1850512318.
