= Petrov's Defence =

Chess opening

Position: a8 black rook, b8 black knight, c8 black bishop, d8 black queen, e8 black king, f8 black bishop, h8 black rook, a7 black pawn, b7 black pawn, c7 black pawn, d7 black pawn, f7 black pawn, g7 black pawn, h7 black pawn, f6 black knight, e5 black pawn, e4 white pawn, f3 white knight, a2 white pawn, b2 white pawn, c2 white pawn, d2 white pawn, f2 white pawn, g2 white pawn, h2 white pawn, a1 white rook, b1 white knight, c1 white bishop, d1 white queen, e1 white king, f1 white bishop, h1 white rook
- Moves: 1.e4 e5 2.Nf3 Nf6
- ECO: C42–C43
- Named after: Alexander Petrov
- Parent: King's Knight Opening
- Synonyms: Petroff Defence; Petrov Defence; Petrov's Game; Russian Defence; Russian Game

Petrov's Defence is a chess opening characterised by the following moves:

1. e4 e5
2. Nf3 Nf6

Although this symmetrical counterattacking response to 2.Nf3 has a long history, it was first popularised by Alexander Petrov, a Russian chess player in the mid-19th century. In recognition of the early investigations by the Russian masters Petrov and Carl Jaenisch, this opening is also called the Russian Game, which is the predominant name in some countries.

The Petrov has a drawish reputation, though there are attacking opportunities for both sides, and a few lines are quite sharp. The Black counterattack in the centre also avoids the Ruy Lopez, Italian Game, and Scotch Game. White's most common response are 3.Nxe5 and 3.d4 (the Steinitz Variation).

The Petrov has been adopted by many of the world's leading players, including world champions Vasily Smyslov, Tigran Petrosian, Anatoly Karpov, and Vladimir Kramnik, along with grandmaster Fabiano Caruana and others.

== Main variations ==
White's two main choices are 3.Nxe5 and 3.d4. 3.Nxe5 is more popular but they often lead to similar positions and "there is no clear reason to prefer one move over the other".

3.Nc3 may transpose to the Four Knights Game. 3.Bc4 may lead to the Boden–Kieseritzky Gambit or transpose to the Two Knights Defence or Bishop's Opening. Occasionally seen is the quiet 3.d3.

== Classical Variation: 3.Nxe5 ==
Position: a8 black rook, b8 black knight, c8 black bishop, d8 black queen, e8 black king, f8 black bishop, h8 black rook, a7 black pawn, b7 black pawn, c7 black pawn, f7 black pawn, g7 black pawn, h7 black pawn, d6 black pawn, f6 black knight, e5 white knight, e4 white pawn, a2 white pawn, b2 white pawn, c2 white pawn, d2 white pawn, f2 white pawn, g2 white pawn, h2 white pawn, a1 white rook, b1 white knight, c1 white bishop, d1 white queen, e1 white king, f1 white bishop, h1 white rook

Position after 3.Nxe5 d6

After 3.Nxe5, the standard reply for Black is 3...d6 (3...Nxe4?! is usually considered an error). After 4.Nf3 Nxe4, White's main options are 5.d4, intending to undermine the knight on e4, and 5.Nc3, aiming for rapid development with queenside castling and a kingside attack. Other moves offer little hope for an advantage.

=== Main line: 3...d6 4.Nf3 Nxe4 5.d4 d5 6.Bd3 ===
This is the most common line, reaching a position that has occurred in thousands of top-level games. The position is similar to an Exchange French in which Black has played the extra move ...Nf6–e4, though this extra move is not necessarily to Black's advantage. White will try to drive Black's advanced knight from e4 with moves like c4 and Re1. In practice White is usually able to achieve this, but at some structural cost such as having to play c4, which balances out.

A variety of sixth moves are possible for Black: 6...Bd6, 6...Be7, and 6...Nc6 are the most common. 6...Be7 and 6...Nc6 often transpose to the same line via 6...Be7 7.0-0 Nc6 or 6...Nc6 7.0-0 Be7. The most common move for White is then 8.c4.

==== Jaenisch Variation: 6...Be7 7.0-0 Nc6 8.c4 ====
Position: a8 black rook, c8 black bishop, d8 black queen, e8 black king, h8 black rook, a7 black pawn, b7 black pawn, c7 black pawn, e7 black bishop, f7 black pawn, g7 black pawn, h7 black pawn, c6 black knight, d5 black pawn, c4 white pawn, d4 white pawn, e4 black knight, d3 white bishop, f3 white knight, a2 white pawn, b2 white pawn, f2 white pawn, g2 white pawn, h2 white pawn, a1 white rook, b1 white knight, c1 white bishop, d1 white queen, f1 white rook, g1 white king

Jaenisch Variation: 4.Nf3 Nxe4 5.d4 d5 6.Bd3 Be7 7.0-0 Nc6 8.c4

Position: c8 black rook, e8 black rook, g8 black king, a7 black pawn, b7 black pawn, c7 black pawn, e7 black bishop, f7 black pawn, g7 black pawn, h7 black pawn, c6 black knight, d5 black queen, f5 black bishop, d4 white pawn, f4 white bishop, a3 white pawn, c3 white pawn, f3 white knight, e2 white bishop, f2 white pawn, g2 white pawn, h2 white pawn, a1 white rook, d1 white queen, e1 white rook, g1 white king

Main line: 8...Nb4 9.Be2 0-0 10.Nc3 Bf5 11.a3 Nxc3 12.bxc3 Nc6 13.Re1 Re8 14.cxd5 Qxd5 15.Bf4 Rac8

This line has been credited to Carl Jaenisch and has been popular for over a century. Black's most common reply to 8.c4 is 8...Nb4. After this, White usually retreats the bishop with 9.Be2, a line popularised by Anatoly Karpov. The main line of the variation continues 9...0-0 10.Nc3 Bf5 (or 10...Be6; 11.Ne5 is White's main reply) 11.a3 Nxc3 12.bxc3 Nc6 13.Re1 Re8. This line appeared twice in the Classical World Chess Championship 2004, where Vladimir Kramnik (playing White) was able to defeat Peter Leko in both games.

Most common for White after 13.Re1 Re8 is 14.cxd5 Qxd5, a position that can also be reached via 10.a3 Nc6 11.cxd5 Qxd5 12.Nc3 Nxc3 13.bxc3 Bf5 14.Re1 Re8, or via 13.cxd5 Qxd5 14.Re1 Re8 in the main line. If White delays the pawn capture, most often with 14.Bf4, Black may play 14...dxc4, continuing 15.Bxc4 Bd6, an important sideline. 13...dxc4 is also possible, but seems to leave White with an edge. Otherwise, after 14.cxd5 Qxd5, play tends to continue with 15.Bf4 Rac8, followed by 16.Bd3 or 16.h3.

After 9.Be2, other possible moves for Black are 9...dxc4 (which gives White an isolated queen's pawn), 9...Bf5, and 9...Be6. Queen exchanges via 10.Qa4+ Qd7 11.Qxd7+ can occur. 9...Be6 10.c5 is another notable line. On the ninth move, White may also allow Black to capture the bishop in exchange for the knight via 9.cxd5 or 9.Re1, but this is less well regarded than retreating.

Less common eighth-move alternatives for Black include:

- Retreating the knight with 8...Nf6. The line typically continues 9.Nc3 0-0 10.h3 Nb4 11.Be2 dxc4 12.Bxc4, and then most often 12...c6 13.Re1 Nbd5. There are also other move orders used to reach the same position.
- Aggressively developing the bishop with 8...Bg4. White's best move is 9.Nc3.
- The oldest reply, 8...Be6. It is considered playable but weak to 9.cxd5 Bxd5 10.Nc3 or 9.Re1 Nf6 10.c5.

==== 8.Re1 ====
Position: a8 black rook, d8 black queen, e8 black king, h8 black rook, a7 black pawn, b7 black pawn, c7 black pawn, e7 black bishop, g7 black pawn, h7 black pawn, c6 black knight, d5 black pawn, f5 black pawn, d4 white pawn, e4 black knight, g4 black bishop, b3 white queen, c3 white pawn, d3 white bishop, f3 white knight, a2 white pawn, b2 white pawn, f2 white pawn, g2 white pawn, h2 white pawn, a1 white rook, b1 white knight, c1 white bishop, e1 white rook, g1 white king

7.0-0 Nc6 8.Re1 Bg4 9.c3 f5 10.Qb3

8.Re1 is a serious (but less frequent) alternative to 8.c4. It was played by Emanuel Lasker at the Saint Petersburg 1895–96 chess tournament in a game against Harry Pillsbury. Though 8...Bf5 is also seen, the main reply for Black is 8...Bg4. Play may continue with 9.c4 Nf6, which tends to end up resulting in a reduction in central tension, or 9.c3 f5, a very sharp system.

After 9.c4 Nf6, play may continue with either 10.Nc3 Bxf3 11.Qxf3 Nxd4, 10.cxd5 Nxd5, or 10.cxd5 Bxf3 11.Qxf3 Qxd5, often leading to an endgame after 12.Qxd5 Nxd5. Both of the latter two continuations leave White with an isolated queen's pawn.

9.c3 f5 is a sharper continuation. The main line thereof is 10.Qb3 0-0 11.Nbd2 (11.Qxb7? is a trap) Na5, harassing White's queen. A even sharper and difficult to assess alternative is 11...Kh8, removing the Black king from a pin by White's queen on Black's d-pawn, preparing for 12...Rf6 and 13...Rg6, with the idea of attacking White's king, while allowing 12.Qxb7, which is now sound. 10...Qd6 is also possible for Black, though inferior to 10...0-0.

==== Marshall Variation: 6...Bd6 ====
The main line of the Marshall Variation (6...Bd6) continues 7.0-0 0-0 8.c4 (8.Re1 is also possible). The most common move is then 8...c6, where White has the options of 9.Re1, 9.Nc3, 9.cxd5, and 9.Qc2, which was played against Howard Staunton in an 1851 game.

A common alternative to 8...c6 is 8...Bg4, played by Frank Marshall, the namesake of the variation. This line is also often reached via 7...Bg4 8.c4 0-0. Within this line, a famous trap is 9.cxd5 f5 10.Re1?! Bxh2+. After 11.Kxh2, Black can play 11.Nxf2, and White has nothing better than 12.Qe2 Nxd3 13.Qe6+ Kh8 14.Bg5, leaving Black up a pawn and with a safer king.

==== Other lines ====
- After 6...Be7 7.0-0 Nc6, 8.Nbd2 and 8.Nc3 are two modern tries for White that have emerged.
- After 6...Be7 7.0-0, 7...0-0 is an option for Black that avoids transposing to the frequently played 6...Nc6 lines.
- After 6...Nc6 7.0-0, 7...Bg4 is Black's only notable alternative to 7...Be7.
- 6...Bf5, typically combined with 7...Be7 (or in the move order 6...Be7 7.0-0 Bf5) is a lesser seen alternative line also tried by Karpov.

=== Nimzowitsch Attack: 5.Nc3 ===
Position: a8 black rook, b8 black knight, c8 black bishop, d8 black queen, e8 black king, f8 black bishop, h8 black rook, a7 black pawn, b7 black pawn, c7 black pawn, f7 black pawn, g7 black pawn, h7 black pawn, d6 black pawn, c3 white pawn, f3 white knight, a2 white pawn, b2 white pawn, c2 white pawn, f2 white pawn, g2 white pawn, h2 white pawn, a1 white rook, c1 white bishop, d1 white queen, e1 white king, f1 white bishop, h1 white rook

3...d6 4.Nf3 Nxe4 5.Nc3 Nxc3 6.dxc3

A completely different approach is to meet 4...Nxe4 with 5.Nc3 Nxc3 6.dxc3 with rapid development and queenside castling. For instance, White can plan a quick Be3, Qd2, and 0-0-0, and play for a kingside attack, trusting that the doubled c-pawns will help protect the king, and that a strong initiative and attacking potential will offset the longterm disadvantage of having doubled pawns. In the 5.Nc3 line, Black must avoid 5...Bf5?? 6.Qe2! which wins a piece due to the pin (if 6...Qe7 7.Nd5, forcing 7...Qd7 because of the threat to the c7-pawn; then 8.d3 wins the piece). Viswanathan Anand resigned after only six moves after falling for this against Alonso Zapata at Biel in 1988.

=== Alternatives to 5.d4 and 5.Nc3 ===
- 5.Qe2, the Lasker Variation, forces simplification and a likely draw after 5...Qe7 6.d3 Nf6.
- 5.d3 is a quieter line. Play may transpose into an Exchange French after 5...Nf6 6.d4 d5.
- 5.c4, the Kaufmann Attack, was also explored by Keres. The idea is to discourage ...d5 before undermining the Black knight on e4, however this plan is rather slow, and Black can instead choose to retreat the knight to g5, e.g. 5...Be7 6.d4 0-0 7.Bd3 Ng5 with equality. Alternatively, Black can counter White's plan with 5...Nc6, intending to answer 6.d4 with 6...d5!
- 5.Bd3 is the Millennium Attack.

=== Alternatives to 4.Nf3 ===
- 4.Nxf7 (Cochrane Gambit). This line was labelled "speculative but entertaining" by Nick de Firmian in Modern Chess Openings. He evaluates the position in Topalov–Kramnik, Linares 1999 as offering chances for both sides after 4...Kxf7 5.Nc3 c5!? 6.Bc4+ Be6 7.Bxe6+ Kxe6 8.d4 Kf7 9.dxc5 Nc6.
- 4.Nc4 (Paulsen Variation). This move was labelled "ineffective" by de Firmian, though it is occasionally seen at grandmaster level.
- 4.Nd3 (Karklins–Martinovsky Variation). US master Andrew Karklins has experimented with 4.Nd3!?, now called the Karklins–Martinovsky Variation. Janjgava assesses it as "poor", but it was played in the World Chess Championship 2018 between Magnus Carlsen and Fabiano Caruana.

=== Alternatives to 3...d6 ===
==== Damiano Variation: 3...Nxe4 ====
Position: a8 black rook, b8 black knight, c8 black bishop, d8 black queen, e8 black king, f8 black bishop, h8 black rook, a7 black pawn, b7 black pawn, c7 black pawn, d7 black pawn, f7 black pawn, g7 black pawn, h7 black pawn, e5 white knight, e4 black knight, a2 white pawn, b2 white pawn, c2 white pawn, d2 white pawn, e2 white queen, f2 white pawn, g2 white pawn, h2 white pawn, a1 white rook, b1 white knight, c1 white bishop, e1 white king, f1 white bishop, h1 white rook

3.Nxe5 Nxe4 4.Qe2

The Damiano Variation, 3...Nxe4, is usually regarded as an error, though it has occasionally been seen in recent grandmaster play. Black must play accurately to avoid an immediately losing position. After 4.Qe2 there are several moves that Black must avoid.

- 4...Nf6?? 5.Nc6+ wins the queen.
- 4...d5? 5.d3 Qe7 6.dxe4 Qxe5 7.exd5 and Black loses a pawn.
- 4...d6? 5.Nxf7! Kxf7 6.Qxe4 and Black has lost a pawn and the ability to castle.

Best is 4...Qe7 5.Qxe4 d6 6.d4 dxe5 7.dxe5 Nc6, and after 8.Nc3 Qxe5 9.Qxe5+ Nxe5 10.Nb5 (or 10.Bf4) White has a moderate advantage.

==== Stafford Gambit: 3...Nc6?! ====
Recently dubbed the Stafford Gambit, 3... Nc6?! is considered dubious, but it sets a number of traps. It was advocated by Eric Rosen in the early 2020s and became popular in online games. After 4.Nxc6 dxc6, White wins a pawn but must play carefully. After 5.e5 (5.d3 is better) Ne4 6.d3?? (White should play 6.Nc3, 6.d4, or 6.Qe2) 6...Bc5! and White resigned in Lowens–Stafford, US correspondence game 1950. Following 5.d3 Bc5, White must avoid the Légal Trap 6.Bg5?? Nxe4!, and if 7.Bxd8 (relatively best but still losing is 7.Be3) 7...Bxf2+ 8. Ke2 Bg4#. Instead, White should play 6.Be2 h5 7.h3 (7.c3 with 8.d4 to follow is also good) and after 7...Qd6 8.c3 Black has insufficient compensation for the pawn, though White must still play carefully.

==== 3...Qe7 ====
3...Qe7?! is inferior, as 4.d4 d6 5.Nf3 Qxe4+ 6.Be2 gives White a large lead in development.

== Steinitz Variation: 3.d4 ==
Position: a8 black rook, b8 black knight, c8 black bishop, d8 black queen, e8 black king, f8 black bishop, h8 black rook, a7 black pawn, b7 black pawn, c7 black pawn, d7 black pawn, f7 black pawn, g7 black pawn, h7 black pawn, f6 black knight, e5 black pawn, d4 white pawn, e4 white pawn, f3 white knight, a2 white pawn, b2 white pawn, c2 white pawn, f2 white pawn, g2 white pawn, h2 white pawn, a1 white rook, b1 white knight, c1 white bishop, d1 white queen, e1 white king, f1 white bishop, h1 white rook

Steinitz Variation: 3.d4

3.d4 was the preferred move of World Champion Wilhelm Steinitz, who recommended it in his The Modern Chess Instructor (1889) and played it three times against Harry Nelson Pillsbury in the Saint Petersburg 1895–96 tournament, winning two games and drawing one. It has become more popular in the 21st century, though still behind 3.Nxe5.

Black's most common reply is 3...Nxe4. After White's usual 4.Bd3, the main line continues 4...d5 5.Nxe5, followed 5...Nd7, a modern move that has become predominant, or the older symmetrical 5...Bd6.

The asymmetrical lines 4.dxe5 and 5.dxe5 are also not uncommon, particularly when White is determined to avoid a draw. 4.Nxe5 is also possible but uncommon as it gives Black the option to transpose to the Classical Variation with 4...d6. Otherwise, it usually reaches the 3.d4 Nxe4 4.Bd3 main line after 4...d5 5.Bd3.

=== Main line: 3...Nxe4 4.Bd3 d5 5.Nxe5 Nd7 ===
Position: a8 black rook, c8 black bishop, d8 black queen, e8 black king, f8 black bishop, h8 black rook, a7 black pawn, b7 black pawn, c7 black pawn, d7 black knight, f7 black pawn, g7 black pawn, h7 black pawn, d5 black pawn, e5 white knight, d4 white pawn, e4 black knight, d3 white bishop, a2 white pawn, b2 white pawn, c2 white pawn, f2 white pawn, g2 white pawn, h2 white pawn, a1 white rook, b1 white knight, c1 white bishop, d1 white queen, e1 white king, h1 white rook

Main line: 3.d4 Nxe4 4.Bd3 d5 5.Nxe5 Nd7

After 3...Nxe4 4.Bd3 d5 5.Nxe5, Black's best regarded move is 5...Nd7, which has been advocated by Vladimir Kramnik, Viswanathan Anand, and others. White typically plays 6.Nxd7, 6.Nc3, or 6.0-0 in response. This line was considered problematic for Black until 1980, when Danish GM Bent Larsen played a pawn sacrifice in a game against World Champion Anatoly Karpov and won as Black. This brought great attention to 5...Nd7, which had not been Black's main reply at the time, as White was considered to have easy development after the sharp 6.Qe2.

White's most common move is 6.Nxd7, which continues 6...Bxd7 7.0-0. Black then has a major choice; the main options are the quiet move 7...Be7, the aggressive queen move 7...Qh4, and 7...Bd6, the most popular move, which was considered a third-rate move in the 20th century.

==== 6.Nxd7 Bxd7 7.0-0 Bd6 ====
After 7...Bd6 White tends to respond with 8.c4, 8.Nc3, or 8.Qh5. After 8.c4, the main line is 8...c6 9.cxd5 cxd5 10.Nc3 Nxc3 11.bxc3 0-0 12.Qh5. Common deviations include 9.Nc3, which usually transposes to the same line, and an immediate 10.Qh5.

==== 6.Nxd7 Bxd7 7.0-0 Qh4 ====
After 7...Qh4, the main continuation is 8.c4 0-0-0 9.c5. Black then most often replies 9...g5, but 9...g6 is not uncommon. This line is considered the sharpest available to Black in the main line of the Steinitz Variation and its merits have been heavily debated, though statistics suggest White has an edge.

==== Other lines ====
- 6.0-0 and 6.Nc3 both tend to continue 6...Nxe5.
- 6.Qe2 is a sharp line. The line typically continues with the same pawn sacrifice seen in the game that Larsen won as Black: 6.Qe2 Nxe5! 7.Bxe4 dxe4 8.Qxe4 Be6 9.Qxe5 Qd7.
- 6.Nxf7 is a drawing line; after 6...Kxf7 7.Qh5+, White can force a draw by repetition (perpetual check) or force Black to accept an inferior position.

=== 5...Bd6 ===
Position: a8 black rook, b8 black knight, c8 black bishop, d8 black queen, f8 black rook, g8 black king, a7 black pawn, b7 black pawn, c7 black pawn, f7 black pawn, g7 black pawn, h7 black pawn, d6 black bishop, d5 black pawn, e5 white knight, d4 white pawn, e4 black knight, d3 white bishop, a2 white pawn, b2 white pawn, c2 white pawn, f2 white pawn, g2 white pawn, h2 white pawn, a1 white rook, b1 white knight, c1 white bishop, d1 white queen, f1 white rook, g1 white king

5.Nxe5 Bd6 6.0-0 0-0

Position: a8 black rook, d8 black rook, h8 black king, a7 black pawn, b7 black pawn, g7 black pawn, h7 black pawn, c6 black pawn, e5 white pawn, f5 black pawn, f4 white bishop, g4 black bishop, a2 white pawn, b2 white pawn, d2 white knight, f2 white pawn, g2 white bishop, h2 white pawn, a1 black knight, c1 white rook, g1 white king

Position after 19.Nd2

This line is significantly less common than 5...Nd7, though it was once the main move (alongside 5...Be7). It results in a perfectly symmetrical position after the fifth move. Play tends to continue with 6.0-0 0-0 7.c4 and then either 7...Bxe5, the Trifunović Variation, or the quieter 7...c6.

A long and complicated tactical sequence which has frequently been seen in master games is 6.0-0 0-0 7.c4 Bxe5 8.dxe5 Nc6 9.cxd5 Qxd5 10.Qc2 Nb4 11.Bxe4 Nxc2 12.Bxd5 Bf5 13.g4 Bxg4 14.Be4 Nxa1 15.Bf4 f5 16.Bd5+ Kh8 17.Rc1 c6 18.Bg2 Rfd8 19.Nd2 (diagram) and White has the slightly better endgame after either 19...Rxd2 20.Bxd2 Rd8 21.Bc3 Rd1+ 22.Rxd1 Bxd1 or 19...h6 20.h4.

=== Murey Variation: 4...Nc6 ===
Position: a8 black rook, c8 black bishop, d8 black queen, e8 black king, f8 black bishop, h8 black rook, a7 black pawn, b7 black pawn, c7 black pawn, d7 black pawn, f7 black pawn, g7 black pawn, h7 black pawn, c6 black knight, e5 black pawn, d4 white pawn, e4 black knight, d3 white bishop, f3 white knight, a2 white pawn, b2 white pawn, c2 white pawn, f2 white pawn, g2 white pawn, h2 white pawn, a1 white rook, b1 white knight, c1 white bishop, d1 white queen, e1 white king, h1 white rook

Murey Variation: 4.Bd3 Nc6

Position: a8 black rook, c8 black bishop, d8 black queen, e8 black king, f8 black bishop, h8 black rook, a7 black pawn, b7 black pawn, c7 black pawn, f7 black pawn, g7 black pawn, h7 black pawn, c6 black knight, f6 black knight, d5 black pawn, d4 white pawn, e4 black pawn, d3 white bishop, f3 white knight, a2 white pawn, b2 white pawn, c2 white pawn, f2 white pawn, g2 white pawn, h2 white pawn, a1 white rook, b1 white knight, c1 white bishop, d1 white queen, e1 white king, h1 white rook

Trap: 5.Bxe4?! d5! 6.Bd3 e4!

An alternative for Black to the main line with 4.Bd3 d5 is 4.Bd3 Nc6, the Murey Variation. Though Black's knight on e4 appears to hang, 5.Bxe4 can be met with 5...d5!, where White's bishop has no good retreat squares; if 6.Bd3, 6...e4! forks White's knight and bishop. Instead, more typical for White are 5.Nxe5 and 5.dxe5; 5.d5 and 5.0-0 are also seen.

=== 4.dxe5 ===
Position: a8 black rook, b8 black knight, c8 black bishop, d8 black queen, e8 black king, f8 black bishop, h8 black rook, a7 black pawn, b7 black pawn, c7 black pawn, d7 black pawn, f7 black pawn, g7 black pawn, h7 black pawn, e5 white pawn, e4 black knight, f3 white knight, a2 white pawn, b2 white pawn, c2 white pawn, f2 white pawn, g2 white pawn, h2 white pawn, a1 white rook, b1 white knight, c1 white bishop, d1 white queen, e1 white king, f1 white bishop, h1 white rook

3.d4 Nxe4 4.dxe5

This is a sharper line that induces an asymmetrical pawn structure comparatively early. It can continue 4...d5 or 4...Bc5. After 4...d5, 5.Nbd2 is the main move for White; Black's most common responses are 5...Nxd2, 5...Nc5, and 5...Qd7. After 4...Bc5, play tends to continue either 5.Bc4 Nxf2 or 5.Qd5 Bxf2, which has been played by Pentala Harikrishna.

=== Black's third-move alternatives ===
==== 3...exd4 ====
After 3...exd4, the usual continuation is 4.e5 Ne4 (4...Qe7?! 5.Be2 is better for White) 5.Qxd4 (5.Qe2 is also possible) d5 6.exd6 Nxd6, followed by 7.Nc3 Nc6 8.Qf4 or 7.Bd3 Nc6 8.Qf4. 4.Bc4 instead transposes into the Urusov Gambit, which is not considered wholly sound.

==== 3...d5 ====
3...d5 often ends up transposing to one of the earlier lines. The most important independent line begins with 4.exd5; a typical continuation is 4...exd4 5.Bb5+ c6 6.dxc6, followed by 6...bxc6 or 6...Qa5+.

==== 3...d6 ====
3...d6 transposes to Philidor's Defence.

== Italian Variation: 3.Bc4 ==
3.Bc4 is an occasionally seen alternative for White, often with the intention of playing 3...Nxe4 4.Nc3, the Boden–Kieseritzky Gambit. Black's main alternatives to 3...Nxe4 are 3...Nc6, transposing to the Two Knights Defence, and the aggressive 3...d5.

=== Boden–Kieseritzky Gambit: 3...Nxe4 4.Nc3 ===
Position: a8 black rook, b8 black knight, c8 black bishop, d8 black queen, e8 black king, f8 black bishop, h8 black rook, a7 black pawn, b7 black pawn, c7 black pawn, d7 black pawn, f7 black pawn, g7 black pawn, h7 black pawn, e5 black pawn, c4 white bishop, e4 black knight, c3 white knight, f3 white knight, a2 white pawn, b2 white pawn, c2 white pawn, d2 white pawn, f2 white pawn, g2 white pawn, h2 white pawn, a1 white rook, c1 white bishop, d1 white queen, e1 white king, h1 white rook

Boden–Kieseritzky Gambit: 3.Bc4 Nxe4 4.Nc3

The gambit is not considered wholly sound, since Black has several viable options. Black can accept the gambit with 4...Nxc3 5.dxc3 f6, but must play carefully after 6.0-0 (for example 6...Bc5?? 7.Nxe5! is disastrous; 6...d6 and 6...Nc6 are good).

Another more aggressive try is 6.Nh4, where White goes for a quick assault on Black's king, but Black can maintain a small advantage if he plays cautiously via 6...g6 7.f4 Qe7 8.f5 Qg7 9.Qg4 Kd8. Another possibility is returning the gambit pawn with 4...Nxc3 5.dxc3 c6 6.Nxe5 d5, which equalises.

A third possibility is transposing to the Italian Four Knights Game with 4...Nc6, and if 5.Nxe4, 5...d5. If 5.Bxf7+?, then 5...Kxf7 6.Nxe4 d5 gives Black the bishop pair and control of the centre. If 5.0-0, Black plays 5...Nxc3 6.dxc3 and now Black can play 6...Qe7!, after which Bobby Fischer wrote that "White has no compensation for the Pawn", or 6...f6 transposing to the main line of the Boden–Kieseritzky. Black also has lines beginning 6...Be7 and 6...h6.

=== Other lines ===
- 3.Bc4 Nxe4 4.d3 is an alternative to the Boden–Kieseritzky Gambit for White. Possible lines include 4...Nf6 5.Nxe5 d5 6.Bb3 Bd6 7.d4 0-0 8.0-0 c5, and 4...Nc5 5.Nxe5 d5 6.Bb3 Nxb3 (or 6...Bd6).
- 3.Bc4 Nxe4 4.Nxe5 typically leads to positions similar to the main line Petrov but with White down a tempo after 4...d5 5.Be2 (or other retreats).

== Three Knights Game: 3.Nc3 ==
This leads to the Three Knights Game of Petrov's Defence. It is often played by White in order to avoid lines unique to the Petrov, as 3...Nc6, which transposes to the Four Knights Game, is Black's most common and best-regarded response. It can also be reached via 2.Nc3 Nf6 (the Vienna Game) 3.Nf3. The main alternative is 3...Bb4, and after 4.Nxe5 0-0 5.Be2 Re8 6.Nd3 Bxc3 7.dxc3 Nxe4 8.Nf4 d6 9.0-0 White has a slight advantage due to the bishop pair.

== Closed Variation: 3.d3 ==
White declines to exchange any pieces and instead defends the pawn on e4. Black usually responds with 3...Nc6. White often intends either 4.Be2 or to fianchetto with 4.g3 and 5.Bg2. These lines are also sometimes reached by transposition, and are also the main lines of two rare third moves for White after 2.Nf3 Nc6, 3.g3 (the Konstantinopolsky Opening) and 3.Be2 (the Tayler Opening), which both most often continue 3...Nf6 4.d3.

The symmetrical 3...d6 and aggressive 3...d5, typically continuing with either 4.exd5 Qxd5 5.Nc3 Bb4 6.Bd2 Bxc3 7.Bxc3 Nc6 or with 4.Nbd2, which transposes to the 2.d3 line of Alekhine's Defence, are notable alternatives for Black.

== ECO ==
The Encyclopaedia of Chess Openings codes for Petrov's Defence are C43 (for 3.d4) and C42 (for all other lines).

== Variations compilation ==
The following are common variations:

- 3.Nxe5 (Classical Variation)
  - 3...d6
    - 4.Nf3 Nxe4
      - 5.d4 d5 6.Bd3 (main line)
        - 6...Nc6 7.0-0 Be7
          - 8.c4 (Jaenisch Variation)
          - 8.Re1
        - 6...Bd6 7.0-0 0-0
          - 8.c4 c6 (Staunton Variation)
          - 8.c4 Bg4 (Marshall Variation)
        - 6...Be7 7.0-0 0-0
        - 6...Nc6 7.0-0 Bg4
        - 6...Bf5
      - 5.Nc3 (Nimzowitsch Attack)
      - 5.Qe2 (Lasker Variation)
      - 5.d3
      - 5.c4 (Kaufmann Attack)
      - 5.Bd3 (Millennium Attack)
    - 4.Nc4 (Paulsen Attack)
    - 4.Nd3 (Karklins-Martinovsky Variation)
    - 4.Nxf7 (Cochrane Gambit)
  - 3...Nxe4 (Damiano Variation)
  - 3...Nc6 (Stafford Gambit)
- 3.d4 (Steinitz Variation)
  - 3...Nxe4
    - 4.Bd3
      - 4...d5 5.Nxe5 Nd7
      - 4...d5 5.Nxe5 Bd6
      - 4...Nc6 (Murey Variation)
    - 4.dxe5
    - 4.Nxe5 d5 5.Bd3 (4.Bd3 main line, by transposition)
    - 4.Nxe5 d6 5.Nf3 (3.Nxe5 main line, by transposition)
  - 3...exd4
    - 4.e5 Ne4 5.Qxd4 d5 6. exd6 Nxd6 (main line)
    - 4.Bc4 (Urusov Gambit)
  - 3...d5
  - 3...d6 (Philidor Defence, by transposition)
- 3.Bc4 (Italian Variation)
  - 3...Nxe4 4.Nc3 (Boden–Kieseritzky Gambit)
- 3.Nc3 (Three Knights Game)
  - 3...Nc6 (Four Knights Game, by transposition)
  - 3...Bb4
- 3.d3 (Closed Variation)

== See also ==
- List of chess openings
- List of chess openings named after people
