= Philidor Defence =

Chess opening

Position: a8 black rook, b8 black knight, c8 black bishop, d8 black queen, e8 black king, f8 black bishop, g8 black knight, h8 black rook, a7 black pawn, b7 black pawn, c7 black pawn, f7 black pawn, g7 black pawn, h7 black pawn, d6 black pawn, e5 black pawn, e4 white pawn, f3 white knight, a2 white pawn, b2 white pawn, c2 white pawn, d2 white pawn, f2 white pawn, g2 white pawn, h2 white pawn, a1 white rook, b1 white knight, c1 white bishop, d1 white queen, e1 white king, f1 white bishop, h1 white rook
- Moves: 1.e4 e5 2.Nf3 d6
- ECO: C41
- Named after: François-André Danican Philidor
- Parent: King's Knight Opening
- Synonym: Philidor's Defence

The Philidor Defence (or Philidor's Defence) is a chess opening characterised by the moves:

1. e4 e5
2. Nf3 d6

The solid move 2...d6 defends Black's pawn on e5. White's usual response is to immediately challenge Black in the centre with 3.d4. Black's most common reply is 3...exd4; 3...Nf6 and 3...Nd7 are the main alternatives. It is also frequently reached via other move orders, such as 1.e4 d6 2.d4 Nf6 3.Nc3 e5, where 4.Nf3 transposes. This order encourages White to play Nc3 early, but allows White to exchange queens early via 4.dxe5. 3...Nd7 and only then 4...e5 is another possibility avoiding the endgame but allowing White to avoid transposing in other ways.

The Philidor is named after the famous 18th-century player François-André Danican Philidor, who advocated it as an alternative to the common 2...Nc6. His original idea was to challenge White's centre by the pawn thrust ...f7–f5. Today, the Philidor is known as a solid but passive choice for Black, and is seldom seen in top-level play except as an alternative to the heavily analysed openings that can ensue after the normal 2...Nc6 (such as the Ruy Lopez).

== History ==
In his 1561 book, Ruy López, seeking to debunk Pedro Damiano, advocated 2...d6 as superior to 2...Nc6, on the grounds that 2...Nc6 allows the strong move 3.Bb5, now known as the Ruy Lopez or Spanish Opening. Philidor evidently concurred with this assessment, though he also considered 2.Nf3 inferior to 2.Bc4. Philidor advocated the risky continuation 3.d4 f5!? The Philidor Defence subsequently became a popular opening, though 2...Nc6 remained the most common reply.

The Philidor occurred in one of the most famous games ever played, "The Opera Game" played in 1858 between the American chess master Paul Morphy and two strong amateurs, the German noble Duke Karl of Brunswick and the French aristocrat Count Isouard. The game continued 3.d4 Bg4, a deviation from modern standard lines. The Philidor Defence declined in popularity as positional play became more developed, and it had almost completely vanished from top-tier chess by World War I.

As of 2017, there are no top players who employ the Philidor with regularity, although Étienne Bacrot and Liviu-Dieter Nisipeanu have occasionally experimented with it in classical play. Its popularity in master play has increased slightly, however, over the last 20 years. It has also become fairly popular in rapid, blitz, and bullet chess.

== 3.d4 exd4 ==
Position: a8 black rook, b8 black knight, c8 black bishop, d8 black queen, e8 black king, h8 black rook, a7 black pawn, b7 black pawn, c7 black pawn, e7 black bishop, f7 black pawn, g7 black pawn, h7 black pawn, d6 black pawn, f6 black knight, d4 white knight, e4 white pawn, c3 white knight, a2 white pawn, b2 white pawn, c2 white pawn, f2 white pawn, g2 white pawn, h2 white pawn, a1 white rook, c1 white bishop, d1 white queen, e1 white king, f1 white bishop, h1 white rook

Position after 3.d4 exd4 4.Nxd4 Nf6 5.Nc3 Be7

After 3.d4, the most common response from Black is 3...exd4, which relieves the central tension, although it gives up the centre. After 4.Nxd4 Nf6 5.Nc3, Black normally continues 5...Be7 and 6...0-0.

=== Main line: 4.Nxd4 Nf6 5.Nc3 Be7 ===
This line has been called the Antoshin Variation after Soviet player Vladimir Antoshin; Levon Aronian is an example of a modern proponent. Black achieves a strong defensive position after the intended 6...0-0.

White has several sixth move possibilities; 6.Bf4 (which has become more popular over time), 6.g3, 6.Be2, and 6.Bc4 are all common. The line 6.Bf4 0-0 continues 7.Qd2 Nc6 8.0-0-0 Nxd4 9.Qxd4 and then 9...Be6 10.f3, or 9...a6. 6.Bc4 is not as well regarded for White; after 6.0-0 7.0-0 c6, the position is almost equal.

=== 4.Nxd4 g6 ===
With 4...g6, Black intends to fianchetto the kingside bishop with 5...Bg7, with a typical continuation being 5.Nc3 Bg7 6.Be3 Nf6. Bent Larsen tried this move in a few games, including a draw against Mikhail Tal in 1969. The line can also be reached by transposition, such as via 4...Nf6 5.Nc3 g6 6.Be3 Nf6.

=== Other lines ===
After 4.Nxd4, a rarely seen alternative line for Black is 4...d5 5.exd5, the Paulsen Attack; the most common continuation is 5...Qxd5 6.Qe2+ Be7 7.Nb5 Na6 8.N1c3+/=. White can also play 4.Qxd4, as Paul Morphy favoured, intending 4...Nc6 5.Bb5 Bd7 6.Bxc6 Bxc6 7.Nc3 Nf6 8.Bg5 followed by 0-0-0. This line was played in many 19th-century games.

== Hanham Variation: 3.d4 Nd7 ==
Position: a8 black rook, c8 black bishop, d8 black queen, e8 black king, f8 black bishop, g8 black knight, h8 black rook, a7 black pawn, b7 black pawn, d7 black knight, f7 black pawn, g7 black pawn, h7 black pawn, c6 black pawn, d6 black pawn, e5 black pawn, c4 white bishop, d4 white pawn, e4 white pawn, f3 white knight, a2 white pawn, b2 white pawn, c2 white pawn, f2 white pawn, g2 white pawn, h2 white pawn, a1 white rook, b1 white knight, c1 white bishop, d1 white queen, e1 white king, h1 white rook

Position after 3.d4 Nd7 4.Bc4 c6

The other main option for Black is to maintain the central tension and adopt a setup with ...Nd7, ...Be7, and ...c6. This plan can be achieved via 3...Nd7 or 3...Nf6, each with their own drawbacks. American chess master James Moore Hanham, the namesake of the variation, favoured 3...Nd7; 3...Nf6 was favoured by Aron Nimzowitsch, aiming to avoid the variation 3...Nd7 4.Bc4.

White may reply by developing with either 4.Bc4 or 4.Nc3. Black's aim in the Hanham is a strongpoint defence of e5. Larry Kaufman notes that the Hanham Variation aims to maintain Black's pawn on e5, analogously to closed lines of the Ruy Lopez, and opines that "it would be quite popular and on a par with the major defences to 1.e4, except for the annoying detail that Black can't actually reach the Hanham position by force."

=== 4.Bc4 ===
4.Bc4 is awkward for Black to meet, since 4...Ngf6?! loses to 5.dxe5 Nxe5 (5...dxe5?? 6.Ng5! wins) 6.Nxe5 dxe5 7.Bxf7+ Kxf7 8.Qxd8 Bb4+ 9.Qd2 Bxd2+ 10.Nxd2 winning a pawn, and 4...Be7?, a common mistake, loses a pawn to 5.dxe5 Nxe5 (5...dxe5?? 6.Qd5! wins) 6.Nxe5 dxe5 7.Qh5!

Instead, 4...c6 is best for Black, but this leaves White with the advantage of the bishop pair after 5.0-0 Be7 6.dxe5 dxe5 (6...Nxe5 loses a pawn to 7.Nxe5 dxe5 8.Qh5) 7.Ng5! Bxg5 8.Qh5! Qe7 and now 9.Bxg5 or 9.Qxg5.

=== Improved Hanham Variation: 4.Nc3 Ngf6 ===
Position: a8 black rook, c8 black bishop, d8 black queen, f8 black rook, g8 black king, a7 black pawn, b7 black pawn, d7 black knight, e7 black bishop, f7 black pawn, g7 black pawn, h7 black pawn, c6 black pawn, d6 black pawn, f6 black knight, e5 black pawn, a4 white pawn, c4 white bishop, d4 white pawn, e4 white pawn, c3 white knight, f3 white knight, b2 white pawn, c2 white pawn, f2 white pawn, g2 white pawn, h2 white pawn, a1 white rook, c1 white bishop, d1 white queen, e1 white rook, g1 white king

Improved Hanham Variation, main line: 4.Nc3 Ngf6 5.Bc4 Be7 6.0-0 0-0 7.Re1 c6 8.a4

Tony Kosten dubbed the move order 3...Nf6 4.Nc3 Nbd7 an "improved" Hanham Variation. The original Hanham move order would be 3...Nd7 4.Nc3 Ngf6, but this allows White the option of 4.Bc4 as discussed above. The main line continues 5.Bc4 Be7 6.0-0 0-0, typically followed by 7.Re1 c6 8.a4 or 7.a4 c6 8.Re1, leading to the same position. However, 3...Nf6 permits White to avoid the Improved Hanham with 4.dxe5, a line discussed in § 3.d4 Nf6.

Instead of 6.0-0, 6.Ng5 is considered inferior. The point of the move is that after 6...0-0 7.Bxf7+ Rxf7 8.Ne6 Qe8 9.Nxc7 Qd8 10.Nxa8, White is up material, but Black develops a strong initiative after 10...b5!, e.g., 11.Nxb5 Qa5+ 12.Nc3 Nxe4.

==== Alternative move orders beginning with 1...d6 ====
In recent years, Black has experimented with move orders beginning with 1...d6 in an attempt to reach the improved Hanham while avoiding 3...Nf6 4.dxe5 and 3...Nd7 4.Bc4.

- One such line is 1.e4 d6 2.d4 Nf6 3.Nc3 Nbd7 intending 4.Nf3 e5. White can deviate, however, with 4.f4!? or even 4.g4!?
- Another try is 1.e4 d6 2.d4 Nf6 3.Nc3 e5 which transposes to the improved Hanham after 4.Nf3 Nbd7, but White can instead try to gain a small advantage with 4.dxe5 (Kaufman opines that 4.Nge2 is "also promising") 4...dxe5 5.Qxd8+ Kxd8 6.Bc4. After 4.dxe5, Bauer concludes that "White stands a trifle better", but that "provided he plays accurately, Black doesn't have much to fear following 6.Bc4, by choosing any of the three valid replies, 6...Ke8, 6...Bb4, or 6...Be6. Then 7.Bxe6 fxe6 his position remains a hard nut to crack."

== 3.d4 Nf6 ==
Position: a8 black rook, b8 black knight, c8 black bishop, d8 black queen, e8 black king, f8 black bishop, h8 black rook, a7 black pawn, b7 black pawn, c7 black pawn, f7 black pawn, g7 black pawn, h7 black pawn, d6 black pawn, d5 white queen, e5 white pawn, e4 black knight, f3 white knight, a2 white pawn, b2 white pawn, c2 white pawn, f2 white pawn, g2 white pawn, h2 white pawn, a1 white rook, b1 white knight, c1 white bishop, e1 white king, f1 white bishop, h1 white rook

After 3.d4 Nf6 4.dxe5 Nxe4 5.Qd5

Kosten attributes the move 3...Nf6 to Aron Nimzowitsch. It often transposes to the Hanham Variation after 4.Nc3 Nbd7, or, less often, the 3.d4 exd4 line after 4.Nc3 exd4. However, White is considered to have chances of an advantage with the move 4.dxe5, intending to meet 4...Nxe4 (4...dxe5 is a mistake due to 5.Qxd8 Kxd8 6.Nxe5) with 5.Qd5 Nc5 6.Bg5. At that point, Black typically plays 6...Qd7 or 6...Be7. Both moves frequently lead to the players exchanging queens. Two examples of such endgame lines are 6...Qd7 7.exd6 Bxd6 8.Nc3 Qe6+ 9.Be3 (or 9.Qxe6+) Qxd5 10.Nxd5 Nbd7 and 6...Be7 7.exd6 Qxd6 8.Nc3 Qxd5 9.Nxd5 Bd6. If Black desires to keep queens on the board, 6...Qd7 7.exd6 Bxd6 8.Nc3 0-0 9.0-0-0 Nc6 is an option.

== Philidor Countergambit: 3.d4 f5?! ==
Position: a8 black rook, b8 black knight, c8 black bishop, d8 black queen, e8 black king, f8 black bishop, g8 black knight, h8 black rook, a7 black pawn, b7 black pawn, c7 black pawn, g7 black pawn, h7 black pawn, d6 black pawn, e5 black pawn, f5 black pawn, d4 white pawn, e4 white pawn, f3 white knight, a2 white pawn, b2 white pawn, c2 white pawn, f2 white pawn, g2 white pawn, h2 white pawn, a1 white rook, b1 white knight, c1 white bishop, d1 white queen, e1 white king, f1 white bishop, h1 white rook

Philidor Countergambit: 3...f5?!

The most aggressive approach for Black after 3.d4 is 3...f5?! (diagram), Philidor's original intention and recommendation. In the 19th century, 3...f5 was also played several times in 1858 by Paul Morphy. The move can lead to more open positions than the other lines, but is often considered too risky and dubious despite having been played by David Bronstein, Jonathan Mestel, Tony Kosten, and Hikaru Nakamura. The line has been dismissed many times by leading chess authorities but has made several comebacks throughout chess history and remains tricky to deal with over the board. As Moll writes, "White is doing very well in most lines. Nevertheless (...) even titled players can easily stumble against well-prepared opposition."

After 3...f5, White has several promising ways to proceed: 4.Nc3, 4.Bc4, 4.dxe5, and 4.exf5 are all common. (4.Bd3 is less strong due to 4...fxe4 5.Bxe4 d5 winning a piece.)

=== 4.Bc4 ===
4.Bc4 is probably the most conclusive way for White to obtain a clear advantage.

- 4...exd4 5.Ng5 Nh6 6.0-0 (6.Nxh7, the Jaenisch Variation, leads to an unclear position after 6...Ng4! 7.Nxf8 Kxf8 8.Qxd4 Nc6) 6...Nc6 7.Re1 f4 (or 7...fxe4 8.Nxe4 Ne5 9.Bxh6 gxh6 10.f4 Nxc4 11.Nxd6+ +/−) 8.Bxf4 Qf6 9.Qd2 Ne5 10.Be2 Bg4 11.f3 Bd7 12.Bg3 0-0-0 13.f4+/−.
- 4...Nf6 5.Ng5 Qe7 (or 5...d5 6.dxe5 dxc4 7.Qxd8+ Kxd8 8.exf6+/−) 6.Bf7+ Kd8 7.Bb3 exd4 8.0-0+/− (Berger).
- 4...fxe4 5.Nxe5 d5 6.Qh5+ g6 7.Nxg6 Nf6 8.Qe5+ Be7 and continuing either 9.Qxe7+, 9.Nxh8 (Steinitz), or 9.Bb5+ (Keres).
- Black's best move is 4...Nc6, which was played by Morphy and already analysed in the Traitté de Lausanne (1698). White should proceed with the rare but strong 5.Ng5! Nh6 6.d5! obtaining a clear space advantage, although the position is relatively closed.

=== 4.Nc3 ===
4.Nc3 also leads to an advantage for White. It is sometimes called the Zukertort Variation.

- 4...fxe4 5.Nxe4 d5 (better is 5...Nf6 6.Nxf6 gxf6 7.dxe5 dxe5 when Black has a fighting chance of achieving equality) 6.Nxe5 dxe4 7.Qh5+ g6 8.Nxg6 Nf6 (if 8...hxg6 9.Qxh8 Be6 10.Qe5+/− Larsen) 9.Qe5+ Kf7 (if 9...Be7 10.Nxh8 Nc6 11.Bb5 Qd5 12.Bg5+/− Zukertort) 10.Bc4+ Kg7 11.Bh6+ Kxh6 12.Nxh8 Bb4+ 13.c3 Qxh8 14.cxb4+/− (Keres). White's best, however, is the strong 6.Neg5! exd4 7.Bb5+! c6 8.0-0! with a close to winning position.
- 4...exd4 5.Qxd4 fxe4 (if 5...Nf6 6.e5!) 6.Bg5 Nf6 7.Nxe4 Be7 8.Bc4 Nc6 9.Qe3+/− (Sozin) or 5.Nxd4! fxe4 6.Bc4! Nf6 7.0-0 with an overwhelming lead in development.
- 4...Nf6 5.dxe5 Nxe4 6.Nxe4 fxe4 7.Ng5 d5 8.e6 Bc5 9.Nxe4!+/− (Sozin, Sokolsky).

=== 4.dxe5 ===
4.dxe5 forces Black to complicate matters further after the main continuation 4...fxe4 5.Ng5 d5, leaving a very sharp position. The main move at that point is 6.e6, the del Rio Attack, which has been known since 1763, but White also has 6.Nc3!? (Steinitz) and 6.c4 when 6...Bb4+ 7.Nc3 d4 leads to very sharp play, ultimately good for White.

After 6.e6, White obtains the upper hand after Morphy's rook sacrifice 6...Bc5!? 7.Nxe4! (7.Nc3 is the Berger Variation, often leading to transpositions; less clear is 7.Nxf7 Qf6 8.Be3 Bxe3!) 7...Be7 8.Qg4!; or 6...Nh6 7.Nc3 (7.g3! was played by George Atwood in 1796 and is good for White) 7...c6 when White has the knight sacrifice 8.Ngxe4!? at their disposal. Black best replies 8...Nf5! when the situation is not clear.

Black can maintain lack of clarity with 6...Nf6!? 7.Nf7 Qe7 8.Nxh8 Bxe6, however, or 6...Bb4+ 7.c3 Bc5 8.Nf7 Qf6 9.Be3 Bxe6 10.Nxh8 Bxe3 11.fxe3 Qh4+ 12.g3 Qh6 13.Qd2 Nd7 14.c4 Ne5 15.Be2 dxc4 16.Nc3 Nd3+ 17.Bxd3 exd3 (Makarov). Also possible is 6...Nc6!? (Moll) 7.Nf7 Qf6 8.Nxh8 Bc5 9.Be3 Bxe3 10.fxe3 Bxe6 with compensation.

=== 4.exf5 ===
After the more positional 4.exf5, regarded as the best continuation by Steinitz, a typical continuation is 4...e4 5.Ng5 Bxf5 (5...Nf6 has been advocated by Jim West, and is best met by 6.f3!) 6.Nc3. White is regarded as having a slight advantage after 6...Nf6 7.f3 (Sozin), or 6...d5 7.f3 when Black must sacrifice a pawn to disrupt White's development with 7...e3!? (Kosten). Modern chess engines have shown that this ultimately leads to fine play for White as well.

== Black's third-move alternatives ==
Inferior is 3...Bg4?!, in light of 4.dxe5 Bxf3 (Black cannot recapture since 4...dxe5? 5.Qxd8+ Kxd8 6.Nxe5 wins a clean pawn; or, Black can gambit a pawn with 4...Nd7) 5.Qxf3 (or White can obtain an endgame advantage with 5.gxf3 dxe5 6.Qxd8+ Kxd8 7.f4+/− Maróczy) 5...dxe5 6.Bc4 giving White the advantage of the bishop pair in an open position as well as a large development advantage. Black cannot block the attack on the f7-pawn with the "natural" 6...Nf6? because White wins a pawn with 7.Qb3 (played in the famous "Opera Game", where Morphy as White refrained from taking the b7-pawn and retained a strong initiative after 7...Qe7 8.Nc3). Black does better with 6...Qf6 7.Qb3 Bc5 8.0-0 Bb6 9.a4 a5 10.Nc3 Ne7 11.Be3 Nd7 12.Rad1+/−, or 6...Qd7!? (Maróczy).

== White's third-move alternatives ==
An alternative approach for White is 3.Bc4, delaying d2–d4, or forgoing it entirely, playing d2–d3 instead. The move 3.Bc4 is also White's route to a possible Légal Trap. Some continuations:

- 3...Nc6 transposes to the Semi-Italian Opening.
- 3...f5 is the López Countergambit, which was already analysed in Gottingen Manuscript and played by Ruy Lopez in 1575.
  - 4.d4 transposes to the Philidor Countergambit.
  - Or unique positions can be obtained such as 4.d3 c6!?, possibly followed by ...f5–f4, ...b7–b5, ...a7–a5, and even ...g7–g5 and ...h7–h5, where all black pawns have moved before any piece. Black's best move is likely 4...Nc6 leading to unclear play.
- Or Black can try 3...Be7!? e.g. 4.0-0 (4.c3 is the Steinitz Variation) Nf6 5.Re1 0-0 6.d4 exd4 7.Nxd4 a6.

Against the alternative 3.c3, Black can try 3...f5 (3...Nc6 4.d4 Nf6 transposes to the Ponziani Opening) 4.exf5 Bxf5 5.Qb3 Nf6 6.Ng5 d5 7.Qxb7 Nbd7 8.Qc6 Bd6 with compensation and initiative.

== See also ==
- List of chess openings
- List of chess openings named after people
