= Sergey Urusov (chess player) =

Russian chess player (1827–1897)

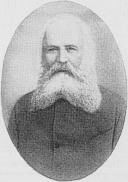
- Sergei Urusov

Personal information
- Born: Sergei Semyonovich Urusov; 3 September 1827
- Died: 20 November 1897 (aged 70)

Chess career
- Country: Russia

Prince Sergey Semyonovich Urusov (Russian: Сергей Семёнович Уру́сов; 3 August 1827 – 20 November 1897) was a Russian chess player. He was also a self-published amateur mathematician. His brother Dmitry Urusov (1829–1903) was also a strong player.

== Career ==
He was a member of the Urusov noble family, holding the title of prince (knyaz), and an officer in the Tsarist army. In 1853 he played a few games against Alexander Petrov who was visiting Saint Petersburg; the score is usually given as 3–1 in favour of Petrov (sources vary on this). The same year he won a match against Ilya Shumov by 4–3, and again in 1854 by a score of 12–9. Also in 1854, he drew a match against Carl Jaenisch by a score of 2-2.

He fought in the Crimean War in 1854–55, and was awarded the Order of Saint George for bravery during the Siege of Sevastopol. During the war he met Leo Tolstoy; the two became long term friends, exchanging frequent correspondence. They later fell out after Tolstoy left the Russian Orthodox Church.

Following the Crimean War, he left the army and devoted himself to chess. There were few organised tournaments at the time, so his chess activity consisted primarily of individual matches. He was considered the second strongest Russian player after Petrov, who beat him again in 1859 by a score of +13 −7 =1; the same year he won matches against Shumov and Viktor Mikhailov. He drew a match against the Austrian Ignatz Kolisch in 1862, who was one of the strongest players in the world at the time, and defeated the strong German player Philipp Hirschfeld in 1866.

In 1878 he retired from chess and bequeathed his valuable collection of chess books to Ilya Tolstoy.

The Urusov Gambit in the Bishop's Opening (1.e4 e5 2.Bc4 Nf6 3.d4 exd4 4.Nf3) is named after him.
