= Urusov =

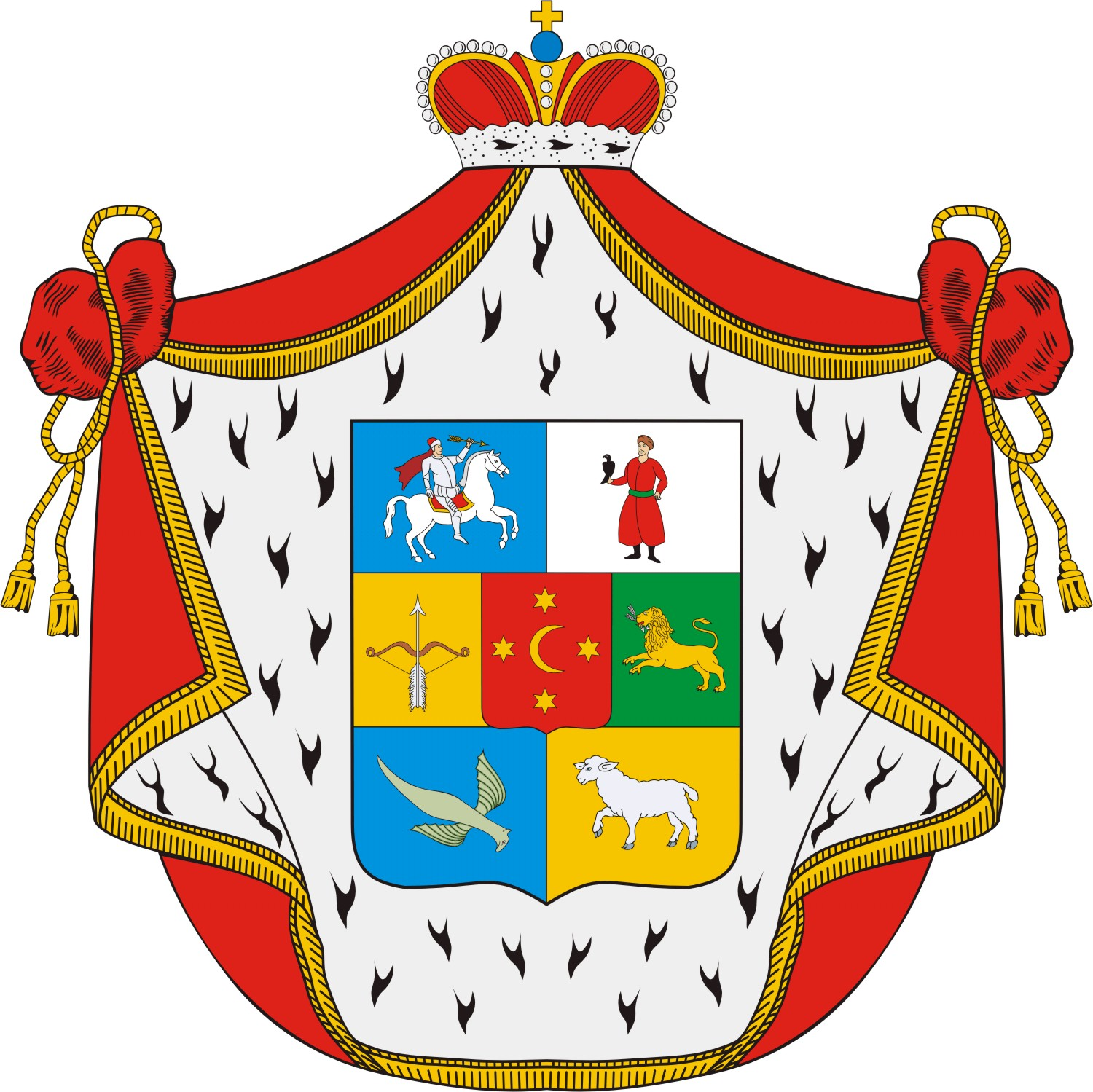
Coat of arms of the House of Ouroussoff

The House of Urusov is an ancient Russian princely family of Nogai origins (from the Turkic word urus, "russian"). Male members were addressed as Urusov/Ouroussoff (Russian: Урусов; masculine), while female members were Urusova/Ouroussoff (Russian: Урусова; feminine).

== Notable members ==
- Andrey Urusov (also known as Kasim-Murza, 1590–1647) — 17th century Novgorod military chief, the son of Satyi-Murza, founder of this branch of Tatar Princes' family
- Alexander Ivanovich Urusov (1843–1900) - Russian lawyer and literary critic
- Alexander Mikhaylovich Urusov (1766–1853) — Moscow Court Office's president, Alexander Ivanovich Urusov's grandfather
- Vasily Urusov (d. 1741) — Russian Rear admiral, the founder of the Russian Caspian flotilla
- Lev Vladimirovich Urusov (1877–1933) — Russian diplomat
- Sergey Nikolayevich Urusov (1816–1883) — Russian politician
- Sergey Semyonovich Urusov (1827–1897) — Russian chess player
- Sergey Dmitriyevich Urusov (1862–1937) — Russian politician
- Nicolai Vladimirovich Ouroussoff (born October 3, 1962) - Architecture critic for The New York Times from 2004 until June 2011.
- Sofya Urusova, Princess Sofya Aleksandrovna Urusova (1804–1889)
