= Vladimir Antoshin =

Soviet chess grandmaster (1929–1994)

Personal information
- Born: 14 May 1929 Moscow, Soviet Union
- Died: 13 May 1994 (aged 64)

Chess career
- Country: Soviet Union
- Title: Grandmaster (1964)
- Peak rating: 2515 (July 1973)
- Peak ranking: No. 63 (July 1971)

Vladimir Sergeyevich Antoshin (Владимир Сергеевич Антошин; 14 May 1929 in Moscow – 13 May 1994) was a Soviet chess Grandmaster, a theoretician and a national champion of correspondence chess.

== Student Olympiad performances ==
As a young man, he was a high achiever, principally as part of the USSR's highly successful Student Olympiad team of 1954–1956. The team won the silver medal at the first-ever Student Olympiad in Oslo 1954 and then took gold medals at Lyons 1955 and at Uppsala 1956. His best performance probably occurred at Lyons, as the strength of the competition was far greater than at Oslo. Playing below world-class grandmasters Mark Taimanov and Boris Spassky, but above Alexey Suetin, his endeavors also earned him an individual gold medal for best score on board three. In all, he accumulated three gold and one silver medal, for a total score of 16/19.

During this period of his career, FIDE awarded him the International Master title (1963) and the Grandmaster title (1964).

== Later career ==
Making a limited number of international tournament appearances, he was successful at Ulaanbaatar (1965) and Zinnowitz (1966). The latter was probably his finest moment, scoring +8−1=6, to take first place among reasonably strong opposition, including Victor Ciocaltea and Wolfgang Uhlmann.

Aside from Zinnowitz, Hartston notes that Antoshin's over-the-board results were never outstanding. His other results were nevertheless respectable; 2nd at Kienbaum (Berlin) 1959 (Uhlmann won), 5th at Moscow 1960 (ahead of Polugaevsky, Hort and Uhlmann), 4th at Sochi 1963, 4th at Moscow 1963 (ahead of Keres, Liberzon, Szabó and Hort), 6th= at Sochi 1964, 2nd at Venice 1966 (Ivkov won) and 4th at Havana 1968 (The Capablanca Memorial). He regularly played at Sochi, but finished lower on other occasions.

His tournament appearances were less frequent in the 1970s. He did, however, share 3rd place at Sarajevo in 1970 and placed runner-up at Frunze in 1979.

A major reason for his limited progress as a player was his continued amateur status. He became a tournament organiser and trainer to the USSR Olympiad team, maintained a second career as a technical designer, and according to Cafferty & Taimanov, was also supposed to have strong links with the KGB. On numerous instances, he travelled abroad with the Russian chess players as a coach but refused to attend to the coaching duties citing that he was there for missions other than the chess coaching.

At the Soviet Championship, he had moderate results, participating in 1955, 1956, 1957, 1967 and 1970. His highest placing was a share of sixth in 1967.

== Theory ==
Antoshin is the eponym of two opening lines, one occurring in the Philidor Defence and the other in the Dutch Defence.

=== Philidor Defence ===
Position: a8 black rook, b8 black knight, c8 black bishop, d8 black queen, e8 black king, h8 black rook, a7 black pawn, b7 black pawn, c7 black pawn, e7 black bishop, f7 black pawn, g7 black pawn, h7 black pawn, d6 black pawn, f6 black knight, d4 white knight, e4 white pawn, c3 white knight, a2 white pawn, b2 white pawn, c2 white pawn, f2 white pawn, g2 white pawn, h2 white pawn, a1 white rook, c1 white bishop, d1 white queen, e1 white king, f1 white bishop, h1 white rook

Antoshin Variation, Philidor Defence after 5...Be7

In the Antoshin Variation, Black chooses to exchange central pawns and head for simple, rapid development of the kingside. After ...0-0 and ...Re8, Black's cramped dark-square bishop is often reactivated by playing it to g7 via f8. Play commences,

1.e4 e5 2.Nf3 d6 3.d4 exd4 4.Nxd4 Nf6 5.Nc3 Be7 (diagram)

and White usually chooses to develop one of his bishops, for example:

6.Bf4 0-0 7.Qd2 c6 8.0-0-0 b5 9.f3 b4 10.Nb1! Qb6 11.g4 d5

with a small advantage to White (Emms) in Hyldkrog–Jensen, corr. 1984. The opening remains fully playable, however, with modern-day proponents including Lev Aronian, Étienne Bacrot and Liviu-Dieter Nisipeanu.

=== Dutch Defence ===
Position: a8 black rook, b8 black knight, c8 black bishop, e8 black king, f8 black bishop, h8 black rook, a7 black pawn, b7 black pawn, c7 black queen, e7 black pawn, g7 black pawn, h7 black pawn, c6 black pawn, d6 black pawn, f6 black knight, f5 black pawn, c4 white pawn, d4 white pawn, c3 white knight, g3 white pawn, a2 white pawn, b2 white pawn, e2 white pawn, f2 white pawn, g2 white bishop, h2 white pawn, a1 white rook, c1 white bishop, d1 white queen, e1 white king, g1 white knight, h1 white rook

Hort–Antoshin Variation, Dutch Defence after 5...Qc7

The Hort–Antoshin Variation was first discovered by Vlastimil Hort in 1960, when he was just 16; it was then further developed by Antoshin and consequently carries the names of both players. Black's idea is to omit the 'normal' ...e6 move and prepare a central break with ...e5 instead. The line may also be used with 'colours reversed' as a variant of Bird's Opening where White is a move up. Play starts,

1.d4 f5 2.g3 Nf6 3.Bg2 d6 4.c4

Burgess gives the more modern alternative 4.Nc3 c6 5.e4 fxe4 6.Nxe4 Nxe4 7.Bxe4 Bf5 8.Qf3 Bxe4 9.Qxe4 Qa5+ 10.c3 as favouring White in Khenkin–Vasiukov, Voskresensk 1990.

4... c6 5.Nc3 Qc7 (diagram)

whereupon, one possible continuation is the direct:

6.e4 e5 7.dxe5 dxe5 8.exf5 Bxf5 9.Nf3 Nbd7 10.0-0 0-0-0

which ended in an early draw in Minev–Hort, Moscow 1960.

== Notable games ==
- Yuri Gusev vs. Vladimir Antoshin, Moscow Championship, 1952, 0–1. Black hits his opponent with successive pawn and exchange sacrifices, in order to open lines towards the enemy king.
