= Ilya Shumov =

Russian chess player

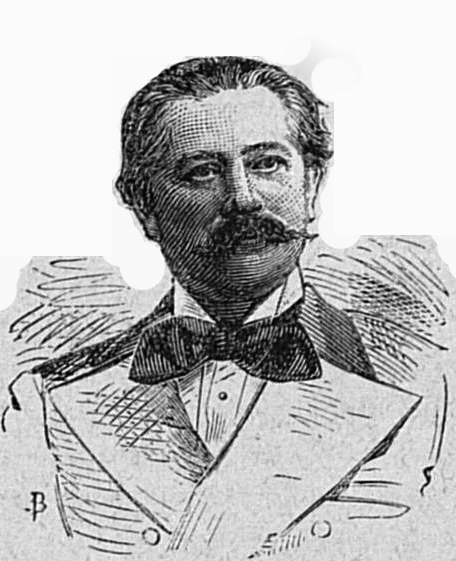
Ilya Shumov.

Ilya Stepanovich Shumov (Russian: Илья́ Степа́нович Шу́мов, 28 June 1819 in Arkhangelsk – July 1881 in Sevastopol) was a Russian chess master.

He served as an officer in the Russian Navy until 1847, then worked as a civil servant in Saint Petersburg. He was invited, along with two other Russian chess masters, Alexander Petrov and Carl Jaenisch, to participate in the London 1851 chess tournament but he did not arrive. He played several matches in Petersburg; lost to Dmitry Urusov (4–7) in 1853, lost and won against Jänisch (3–5 and 7–5) in 1854, lost to Ignatz von Kolisch (2–6) and Alexander Petrov (2–4) in 1862, and lost to Szymon Winawer (2–5) in 1875.
