= Sergey Dmitriyevich Urusov =

Russian aristocrat and politician (1862–1937)

Sergey Urusov
- Сергей Урусов
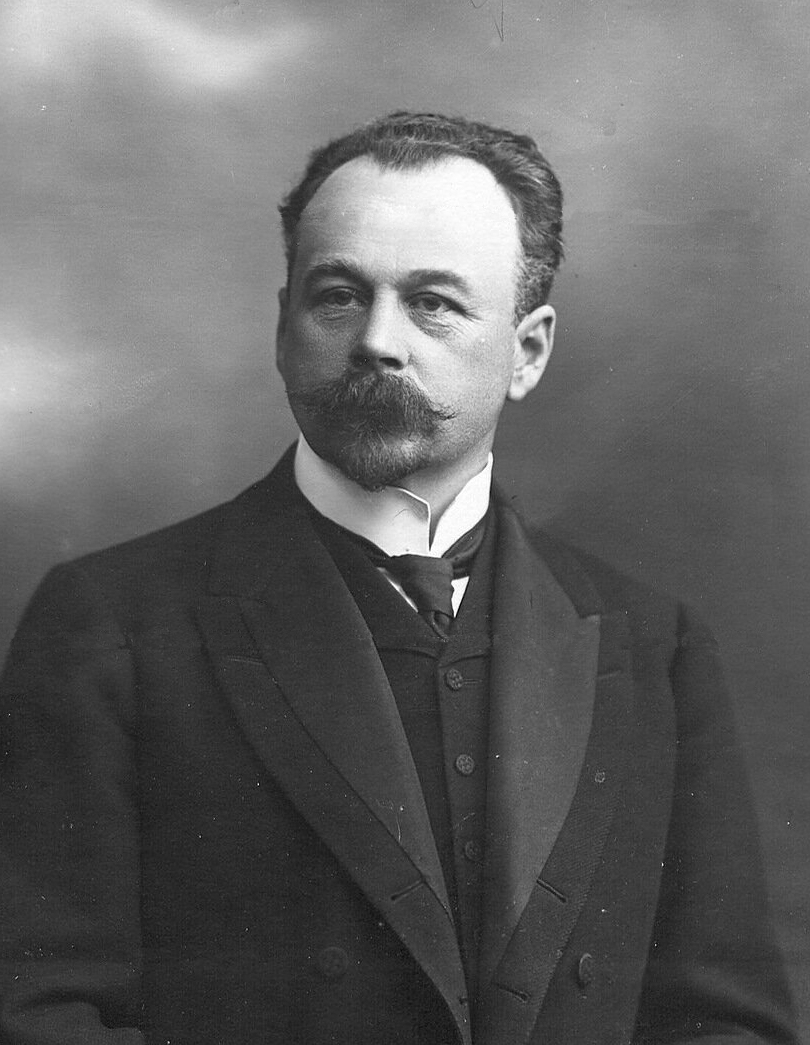
- Urusov in 1906

Governor of Tver
- In office 31 December 1904 – 10 June 1905
- Preceded by: Alexey Shirinsky-Shikhmatov
- Succeeded by: Pavel Sleptsov

Governor of Bessarabia
- In office 30 May 1903 – 31 October 1904
- Preceded by: Rudolf Raaben
- Succeeded by: Alexey Kharuzin

Vice Governor of Tambov
- In office 15 October 1902 – 13 June 1903
- Preceded by: Alexander Choglokov
- Succeeded by: Nikolay Sukovkin

Member of the Russian Constituent Assembly
- In office 25 November 1917 – 20 January 1918 (Note: The Constituent Assembly was declared dissolved by the Bolshevik-Left SR Soviet government, rendering the end the term served.)
- Preceded by: Constituency established
- Succeeded by: Constituency abolished
- Constituency: Bessarabia

Member of the Russian State Duma
- In office 10 May 1906 – 22 July 1906
- Preceded by: Constituency established
- Succeeded by: Multi-member district
- Constituency: Kaluga Governorate

Personal details
- Born: Sergey Dmitriyevich Urusov; 19 March 1862 Spasskoye, Russian Empire
- Died: 5 September 1937 (aged 75) Moscow, Russian SFSR, Soviet Union
- Party: Party of Democratic Reform; Constitutional Democratic
- Other political affiliations: Tactical Center
- Spouse: Sofya Lavrova
- Children: 3
- Parents: Dmitry Urusov (father); Varvara Batashyova (mother)
- Relatives: Dmitry Urusov (brother); Sergey Urusov (uncle)
- Education: Moscow State University
- Profession: Politician
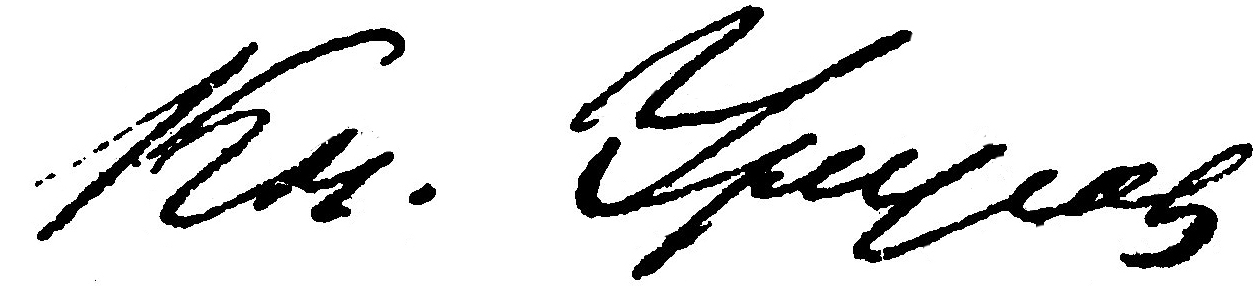
- Signature

Prince Sergey Dmitriyevich Urusov (Russian: Серге́й Дми́триевич Уру́сов; 19 March [O.S. 7 March] 1862 – 5 September 1937) was a Russian politician who was thrice-elected Marshal of the Kaluga Nobility. He was appointed Governor of Bessarabia in May 1903. He served in the government that was set up after the 1917 February Revolution and in the Soviet government. He has been described as "a sincere liberal" and "severe critic of autocracy" who believed in "the inviolability of human rights and freedoms" and "the rule of law."

== Biography ==
=== Early life ===
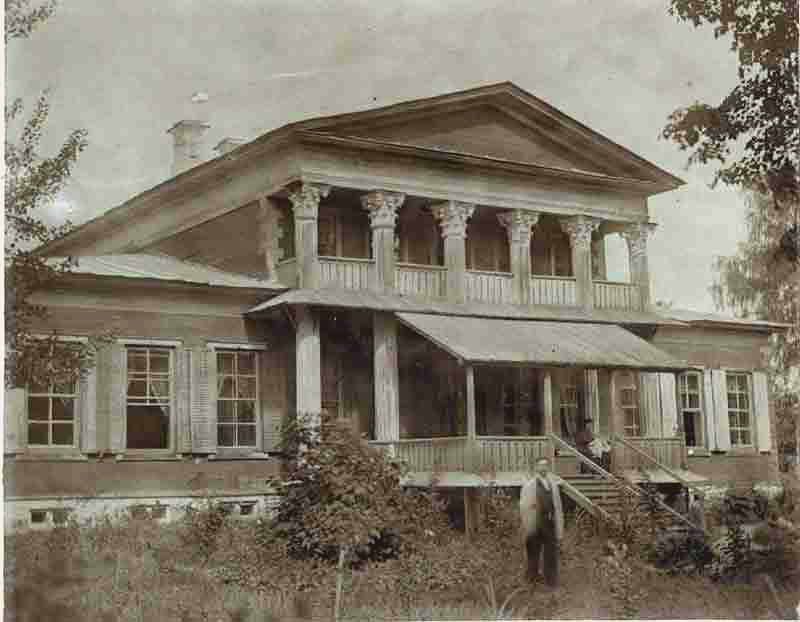
The Urusov estate, demolished in 2011

Born into a long line of aristocratic politicians and diplomats, he was the son of Dmitry Urusov (1829–1903), a retired colonel and chairman of the Yaroslavl provincial district council who was a famous chess player, and Barbara Silovna Batashova (died 1905), the daughter of a rich breeder. Dmitry Semenovich was also a friend of Tolstoy’s. He was the nephew of Sergey Urusov.

Sergey Dmitriyevich received his primary education at home. In 1871 the family moved to Yaroslavl; the next year he entered the Yaroslavl gymnasium, where he stayed until 1881. During these years the family became close friends with the family of Yevgeny Yakushkin, a legal scholar.

In the autumn of that year Sergey Dmitriyevich entered the Faculty of History and Philology of Moscow University. Urusov graduated from Moscow University in 1885, the same year that he married Sofia Vladimirovna Lavrova, daughter of the chairman of the Moscow District Court.

=== Career ===
After graduating from university and marrying, he moved with his wife to her native village of Rasva, Przemysl district, Kaluga province. He took up farming and also ran in elections in the Kaluga province and Moscow. In July 1885, by order of the Ministry of Finance, Urusov was appointed tax inspector of Kaluga and Peremyshl counties. From July 2, 1887 to April 8, 1896, he was the leader of the nobility of the Peremyshl district of the Kaluga province. Beginning in 1887, he held the title of honorary magistrate. From 1890 to 1892, he was Chairman of the Kaluga provincial district council. From 1893 to 1996, he was a member of the accounting committee of the State Bank in Kaluga.

After 1896, he spent a good deal of time abroad. In the autumn of 1897, Sergey Dmitrievich and his family moved to Moscow in connection so that his son Dmitry could attend the 7th Moscow gymnasium. In Moscow he worked in the Office of the Moscow Governor-General, the Grand Duke Sergei Alexandrovich, and served as an inspector for the supervisor of printing and book publishing.

He was also elected to the post of district police officer, and was then named an honorary magistrate. He stayed in Moscow until 1902.

=== Vice-Governor of Tambov ===
In 1902 he was named Vice Governor of Tambov. In Tambov, he was close to the philosopher Boris Chicherin and the local zemstvo (or council). Both in this position and in his subsequent roles as Governor of Bessarabia and Tver he is said to have been a very capable administrator.

=== Governor of Bessarabia ===
On June 6, 1903, after the Kishinev pogrom, he was appointed Governor of Bessarabia on the recommendation of V. K. Plehve. The government wanted him to restore order in a peaceful fashion, without repression or martial law, and he did so with apparent success. This period of his life is the most thoroughly documented owing to the book that he wrote about it.

After his appointment he immediately purchased a guidebook of the area; he would go on to confess that he knew virtually nothing of the area, saying he “knew as little of it [...] as I did of New Zealand, or even less.” Indeed he viewed his appointment to this position in a distant corner of the Empire as a form of exile. Nonetheless, after a short briefing with the Tsar in St. Petersburg, he set off by train, three weeks after his appointment, from Moscow to the Bessarabian capital of Kishinev. The journey took two nights and three days, which Sergey spent in his private compartment studying his guidebook to prepare himself for the meeting with the civic dignitaries, whom he expected to meet upon arrival. Despite writing to his Vice-Governor requesting that he keep the reception party mall, Urusov was met at Bendery, the first major Bessarabian town, in the traditional manner of the region: there was a crowd of people, an orchestra, a group of policemen cordoning off the Vice-Governor (who wore a complete dress uniform), and the city mayor (who carried a platter of bread and salt. One and a half hours later Urusov arrived at Kishinev, where he was driven round the city in an open carriage. The sidewalks were packed with bystanders who “bowed, waved their handkerchiefs,” with some even kneeling as he passed. A modest man, he admitted to being “struck'” by all this, as he was not familiar with such displays of reverence. After a blessing in the Kishinev cathedral he arrived at the Governor's Residence, a palace in neo-classical style in the city centre.

Impressed by the city centre's architecture, its large stone building, paved boulevard, and streets lined with white acacias and poplars, he noted that it would “have made no unfavourable impression” even in the Empire's capital, St. Petersburg. As a local celebrity, he was not permitted to travel except in a carriage with the Chief of Police and a mounted guard as escorts. The provincial society was alien to him and he was taken aback by the “godlike esteem” in which he was held, as well as by the local aristocratic etiquette, which did not even allow him to walk or go shopping.

=== Governor of Tver ===
He served as Governor of Tver from November 1904 to May 15, 1905.

=== After the 1905 revolution ===
In November 1905, he participated in negotiations between Prime Minister Sergei Witte and representatives of the liberal parties. Witte, in October had been given the task of assembling the first cabinet government, offered the liberals several important positions. Urusov was offered the important post of Minister of the Interior, but in the end he was rejected on the grounds that while he was “decent” and “fairly intelligent” he was “not a commanding personality”. The post went to Pyotr Durnovo, a lawyer and statesman with a somewhat scandalous past and poor record, who apparently had been promised the position.

On November 6, Urusov became a comrade (deputy) of the Minister of Internal Affairs in the Witte government.

=== Duma ===
In 1906 he was elected to the First State Duma from the Kaluga province and actively participated in the Duma’s work until its dissolution. Joining the Party of Democratic Reforms, he was a member of the Duma’s agrarian commission and also headed the commission for the development of laws on civil equality. He became famous after giving a speech in the Duma on June 8, 1906, in which he sharply criticized Russia’s domestic policies and in particular the involvement of the police in pogroms against the Jews. The Standard of London described his speech as “historic.” It has been called “one of the most striking and significant events in the history of I Duma.” It was repeatedly interrupted by applause and shouts of “bravo.” His remarks were greeted with long and thunderous applause. The Duma was dissolved by the Czar on July 9, 1906.

=== Prison ===
In 1908, because he had signed the Vyborg Manifesto, calling for civil disobedience in the wake of the dissolution of the Duma, he was sentenced to incarceration in Taganskaya prison in Moscow, where he remained behind bars from May 13 to August 11, 1908.

=== Farming ===
After his release from prison, he returned to farming and made a number of trips around Europe. He also contributed to the Bulletin of Europe and Russian Gazette. The first volume of his book Memoirs of a Russian Governor was published in St. Petersburg in 1907 and was later translated into six European languages. In it, he criticized at length the treatment of Jews by the Czarist government. For this, he was sentenced to four months in prison. From 1912 to 1914 he served as Chairman of the Committee for Livestock and Seed at the Moscow Society of Agriculture.

=== February revolution ===
He returned to public life only after the February Revolution in 1917. In March he was offered the position of Comrade (deputy) Interior Minister in the first Provisional Government. “Full of hope for the future,” he accepted this post, but “soon realized that the Provisional Government had no chance” and resigned two months later, returning to his estate. When the October Revolution occurred, he pronounced it "the greatest experiment in the world.”

=== Bolshevik era ===
In November 1917, his estate was confiscated, and he, as a former governor, was deprived of civil rights. In 1918 he was drafted into the Red Army, in which he served as an accountant for the front command of the naval forces. In 1918, he was incarcerated in Butyrskaya Prison for three and a half months for reasons unknown to him. The next year, on the night of August 29, 1919, he was imprisoned again in the same institution. There was a major campaign to win his release, and representatives of the Russian Jews spoke up for him as a champion of the Jewish people and a critic of the Czarist pogroms.

In 1920, Urusov was imprisoned for being a member of the counter-revolutionary "Tactical Center," but he was released as part of an amnesty on May 19 of that year after signing an agreement not to participate in any political organizations. Still eager to be of use to his country, he worked from November 1, 1921, to March 1, 1925, as a business manager (serving from October 1, 1924, as the head of the General Department) for the Special Commission at the Presidium of the Supreme Economic Council for the Study of Kursk Magnetic Anomaly. Beginning in 1921 he also worked in the Commissariat of Agriculture. Working at the Commissariat of Health from April 1, 1921, to January 25, 1924, he was first secretary, then manager, of the X-ray Electromedical and Photobiological section. During the same period, he was a member of the Moscow City Council’s commission to improve the life of scientists (KUBU). From July 1, 1921 to May 1, 1923, he was a research assistant at the Moscow branch of the commission on the study of the natural productive forces of Russia at the Academy of Sciences, and on June 25, 1925, he was hired as a senior inspector in the inspection department at the board of the State Bank of the RSFSR.

In 1930 he translated a cookbook from the French in collaboration with the chef of the Metropol Restaurant in Moscow. From 1931 to 1932, he worked as an economist in the financial department of the All-Union Trust of pedigree and dairy cattle breeding, and in 1933 he worked in the planning and financial sector of the “Sovkhozzapchast” Narkomsovhozov trust. In his latter years he worked in the library of the Writers' Union.

== Death ==
In his last years he lived in Moscow. At the end of his life, he suffered from asthma attacks and heart failure. He died in Moscow on the night of September 5, 1937, and was buried at the Danilovsky cemetery, although his grave was not preserved.

== Personal life ==
He had a son, Dmitry (1887 - 1937), an agronomist, and two daughters, Vera (1889−1922) and Sophia (1895-1973). Vera’s daughter Elena Alekseevna Fadeeva was a famous actress of the Moscow stage; her other daughter, Ekaterina Alekseevna Fadeeva, was a physician.

== Honors and awards ==
- Order of Saint Vladimir
- Order of the Crown (Romania)
- Order of the Red Banner of Labour

== Sources ==
=== Bibliography ===
- Figes, Orlando (2014). A People's Tragedy: The Russian Revolution 1891–1924. London: The Bodley Head. ISBN 9781847922915.
