= Legal Trap =

One of the methods of fast checkmate in chess game

The Legal Trap or Blackburne Trap (also known as Legal Mate) is a chess opening trap, characterized by a queen sacrifice followed by checkmate involving three minor pieces if Black accepts the sacrifice. The trap is named after the French player Sire de Legall. Joseph Henry Blackburne, a British master and one of the world's top five players in the latter part of the 19th century, set the trap on many occasions.

== Natural move sequence ==
There are a number of ways the trap can arise; the one below shows a natural move sequence from a simultaneous exhibition in Paris. André Cheron, one of France's leading players, won with the trap as White against Jeanlose:

1. e4 e5 2. Nf3 Nc6 3. Bc4 d6

The Semi-Italian Opening.

4. Nc3 Bg4?!

Black pins the knight in the fight over the center. Strategically this is a sound idea, but there is a tactical flaw with the move.

5. h3

In this position 5.Nxe5? would be unsound. While the white queen still cannot be taken (5...Bxd1??) without succumbing to a checkmate in two moves, 5...Nxe5 would win the white knight (for the pawn) and protect the bishop on g4. Instead, with 5.h3, White "puts the question" to the bishop which must either retreat on the c8–h3 diagonal, capture the knight, be captured, or as in this game, move to an insecure square.

Position: a8 black rook, d8 black queen, e8 black king, f8 black bishop, g8 black knight, h8 black rook, a7 black pawn, b7 black pawn, c7 black pawn, f7 black pawn, g7 black pawn, h7 black pawn, c6 black knight, d6 black pawn, e5 black pawn, h5 black bishop, c4 white bishop, e4 white pawn, c3 white knight, f3 white knight, h3 white pawn, a2 white pawn, b2 white pawn, c2 white pawn, d2 white pawn, f2 white pawn, g2 white pawn, a1 white rook, c1 white bishop, d1 white queen, e1 white king, h1 white rook

Position after 5...Bh5?

5... Bh5? (diagram)

Black apparently maintains the pin, but this is a tactical mistake which loses at least a pawn (see below). Relatively best is 5...Bxf3 (or 5...Bd7), surrendering the bishop pair and giving White a comfortable lead in development, but maintaining material equality. 5...Be6!? is also possible.

6. Nxe5!

The tactical refutation. White seemingly ignores the pin and surrenders the queen. Black's best course now is to play 6...Nxe5, where with 7.Qxh5 Nxc4 8.Qb5+ followed by 9.Qxc4, White remains a pawn ahead, but Black can at least play on. Instead, if Black takes the queen, White has checkmate in two moves:

6... Bxd1??

A blunder, winning the queen but losing the game. Black should have played 6...Nxe5 or 6...dxe5 as mentioned in the previous note.

7. Bxf7+ Ke7 8. Nd5#

The final position is a pure mate, meaning that for each of the eight squares around the black king, there is exactly one reason the king cannot move there, and exactly one reason why the king cannot remain on its current square.

Position: a8 black rook, d8 black queen, f8 black bishop, g8 black knight, h8 black rook, a7 black pawn, b7 black pawn, c7 black pawn, e7 black king, f7 white bishop, g7 black pawn, h7 black pawn, c6 black knight, d6 black pawn, d5 white knight, e5 white knight, e4 white pawn, h3 white pawn, a2 white pawn, b2 white pawn, c2 white pawn, d2 white pawn, f2 white pawn, g2 white pawn, a1 white rook, c1 white bishop, d1 black bishop, e1 white king, h1 white rook

Final position after 8.Nd5#

== Legal versus Saint Brie ==
The original game featured Legal playing at rook odds (without Ra1) against Saint Brie in Paris 1750:

1. e4 e5 2. Nf3 d6 3. Bc4 Bg4?! 4. Nc3 g6? 5. Nxe5 Bxd1?? 6. Bxf7+ Ke7 7. Nd5# 1–0

The above version is cited in most publications, sometimes with the move 4... h6 instead of 4... g6. However, research suggests that the move order of the game had been altered retrospectively in order to remove a flaw in the original game. Also the year 1750 is assumed to be wrong; it is more likely that the game was played in 1787, and that the original move order was:

1. e4 e5 2. Bc4 d6 3. Nf3 Nc6 4. Nc3 Bg4 5. Nxe5? Bxd1?? 6. Bxf7+ Ke7 7. Nd5# 1–0

Here the combination is flawed, as with 5... Nxe5 Black could have gained a piece. It is reported that Legal disguised his trap with a psychological trick: he first touched the knight on f3 and then retreated his hand as if realizing only now that the knight was pinned. Then, after his opponent reminded him of the touch-move rule, he played Nxe5, and the opponent grabbed the queen without thinking twice.

== Other variations ==
Black springs Legal's Trap on White

Position: a8 black rook, d8 white bishop, e8 black king, h8 black rook, a7 black pawn, b7 black pawn, c7 black pawn, f7 black pawn, g7 black pawn, h7 black pawn, c6 black pawn, e4 black knight, g4 black bishop, d3 white pawn, a2 white pawn, b2 white pawn, c2 white pawn, e2 white king, f2 black bishop, g2 white pawn, h2 white pawn, a1 white rook, b1 white knight, d1 white queen, f1 white bishop, h1 white rook

Sometimes the mate can be administered by a different piece. This game from Petrov's Defence is very old (The line after 3.. Nc6?! 4.Nxc6 is now commonly referred to as the Stafford Gambit):

1.e4 e5 2.Nf3 Nf6 3.Nxe5 Nc6?! 4.Nxc6 dxc6 5.d3 Bc5 6.Bg5? Nxe4 7.Bxd8?? Bxf2+ 8.Ke2 Bg4# 0–1

The Trap in a modern middlegame

Position: a8 black rook, f8 black king, h8 black rook, a7 black pawn, c7 black pawn, e7 black knight, f7 black pawn, g7 black pawn, h7 black pawn, b6 black bishop, d6 black pawn, f6 black queen, e5 black pawn, a4 white bishop, e4 white pawn, g4 black bishop, c3 white pawn, d3 white pawn, e3 white bishop, f3 white knight, b2 white pawn, f2 white pawn, g2 white pawn, h2 white pawn, a1 white rook, d1 white queen, e1 white king, h1 white rook

Position after 13...Ne7? after a Ruy Lopez Bird's Defence opening from the game Short–Kupreichik, Hastings 1981/82. White gained a pawn with 14.Nxe5!; 14...Bxd1? is met with 15. Nd7+!, winning the queen and bishop (15...Kg8 16. Nxf6+) and damaging Black's pawn structure (16...gxf6 creates an isolated h-pawn and doubled f-pawns), while taking the knight leaves the bishop hanging and allows White to activate their queen. Short went on to win the game.
The Sea-Cadet mate

Position: a8 black rook, d8 black queen, e8 black king, f8 black bishop, g8 black knight, h8 black rook, a7 black pawn, b7 black pawn, c7 black pawn, f7 black pawn, g7 black pawn, h7 black pawn, d6 black pawn, e5 black knight, c4 white bishop, e4 white pawn, g4 black bishop, c3 white knight, f3 white knight, a2 white pawn, b2 white pawn, f2 white pawn, g2 white pawn, h2 white pawn, a1 white rook, c1 white bishop, d1 white queen, f1 white rook, g1 white king

A version of Legal's Mate occurred after 7...Ne5 in a casual game won by Ernst Falkbeer at Vienna in 1847. The game was arranged as a display of living chess in Act II of Der Seekadet, an 1876 operetta by Genée and Zell:

1.e4 e5 2.Nf3 Nc6 3.d4 exd4 4.c3 (the Göring Gambit) dxc3 5.Nxc3 d6 6.Bc4 Bg4 7.0-0 Ne5 8.Nxe5 Bxd1 9.Bxf7+ Ke7 10.Nd5# 1–0

== Considerations ==
A mating pattern where a pinned knight moves, allowing the capture of the player's queen but leading to a checkmate with three minor pieces, occasionally occurs at lower levels of play, though masters would not normally fall for it. According to Bjerke (Spillet i mitt liv), the Legal Trap has ensnared countless unwary players. One author writes that "Blackburne sprang it several hundreds of times during his annual tours."

== See also ==
- Checkmate pattern
- Elephant Trap
