= Carl Jaenisch =

Finnish and Russian chess player and theorist (1813–1872)

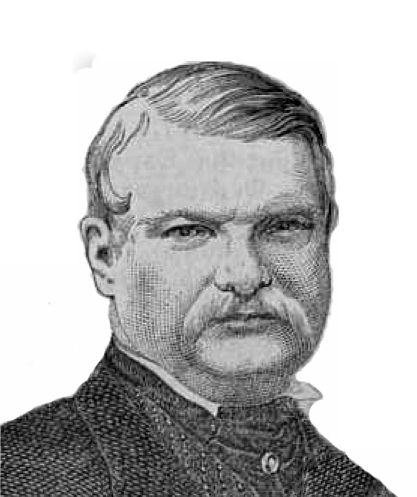
Carl Jaenisch, 1871 illustration

Carl Ferdinand von Jaenisch (Russian: Карл Андреевич Яниш, romanized: Karl Andreyevich Yanish; April 11, 1813 – March 7, 1872) was a Finnish and Russian chess player and theorist. In the 1840s, he was among the top players in the world.

== Life and career ==
Jaenisch was born in Vyborg in the Grand Duchy of Finland. He belonged to the Jaenisch family of civil servants and merchants of Russia German descent, which had moved from Moscow to Vyborg after the Treaty of Nystad in 1721. Jaenisch began a military career in Finland, but soon moved to Saint Petersburg to teach rational mechanics. He dedicated his life to mathematics and chess, two subjects which he considered closely related. He tried to show their connections in his work Découvertes sur le cavalier (aux échecs), published in Saint Petersburg in 1837.

In 1842–1843, he published a book on the openings in two volumes: Analyse Nouvelle des ouvertures. In 1862–63, he published his major work: Traité des applications de l'analyse mathématique au jeu des échecs, in three volumes.

He wanted to take part in the London 1851 chess tournament, but arrived late and instead played a match with Howard Staunton, which he lost +2–7=1. Three years later, he also lost to Ilya Shumov (+3–5=4).

== Legacy ==
Jaenisch is best remembered for having analysed and helped develop Petrov's Defence with Alexander Petrov, and for his work on the Schliemann–Jaenisch Gambit of the Ruy Lopez, which begins 1.e4 e5 2.Nf3 Nc6 3.Bb5 f5!?

The postmodern gambit 1.c4 b5!? is the Jaenisch Gambit, but while Jaenisch mentioned this move, he did not advocate it.

Staunton was most upset at his death in 1872, writing to Tassilo von Heydebrand und der Lasa in November of that year:

I was sorry to lose Lewis and St. Amant, my dear friends Bolton and Sir T. Madden, and others of whom we have been deprived, but for Jaenisch I entertained a particular affection, and his loss was proportionately painful to me. He was truly an amiable and an upright man.

After Jaenisch's death, a scholarship fund in his honor, which survives to this day, was established by his sister.
