= Semi-Open Game =

Type of chess opening

Position: a8 black rook, b8 black knight, c8 black bishop, d8 black queen, e8 black king, f8 black bishop, g8 black knight, h8 black rook, a7 black pawn, b7 black pawn, c7 black pawn, d7 black pawn, e7 black pawn, f7 black pawn, g7 black pawn, h7 black pawn, e4 white pawn, a2 white pawn, b2 white pawn, c2 white pawn, d2 white pawn, f2 white pawn, g2 white pawn, h2 white pawn, a1 white rook, b1 white knight, c1 white bishop, d1 white queen, e1 white king, f1 white bishop, g1 white knight, h1 white rook
- Moves: 1.e4, Black does not reply 1...e5
- ECO: B00–B99, C00–C19
- Synonyms: Half-Open Game; Single King's Pawn Opening

A Semi-Open Game (or Half-Open Game, or Single King's Pawn Opening) is a chess opening in which White plays 1.e4 and Black breaks symmetry immediately by replying with a move other than 1...e5. Semi-Open Games are also called "asymmetrical king's pawn openings".

The most extensively analyzed of the Semi-Open Games is the Sicilian Defense (1.e4 c5). Other popular examples include the French Defense (1.e4 e6) and the Caro–Kann Defense (1.e4 c6). They are the complement of the Open Games (or Double King's Pawn Openings), which begin 1.e4 e5.

== Overview ==
Position: a8 black rook, b8 black knight, c8 black bishop, d8 black queen, e8 black king, f8 black bishop, g8 black knight, h8 black rook, a7 black pawn, b7 black pawn, d7 black pawn, e7 black pawn, f7 black pawn, g7 black pawn, h7 black pawn, c5 black pawn, e4 white pawn, a2 white pawn, b2 white pawn, c2 white pawn, d2 white pawn, f2 white pawn, g2 white pawn, h2 white pawn, a1 white rook, b1 white knight, c1 white bishop, d1 white queen, e1 white king, f1 white bishop, g1 white knight, h1 white rook

The Sicilian Defense (1.e4 c5), the most popular of the Semi-Open Games

The most popular of the Semi-Open Games, and the most popular Black response to 1.e4 overall, is 1...c5, the Sicilian Defense. This is a combative and unbalancing move which often leads to dynamic and sharp positions, and is usually a signal that Black intends to play for a win. It is a heavily analyzed opening which requires thorough preparation and strong tactical ability. While 1...e5 remains popular at all levels, the Sicilian overtook it in popularity in tournament games some time in the mid-20th century.

The French Defense (1...e6) is regarded as a solid option for Black. After 2.d4 d5, Black usually intends to undermine White's center with ...c7–c5. A disadvantage off the French is that Black's light-squared bishop is difficult to develop in the early phase of the game.

The Caro–Kann Defense (1...c6) is similarly motivated, but the light-squared bishop is not restricted after 2.d4 d5, allowing Black to develop it to f5 or g4. A disadvantage compared to the French is that if Black wishes to hit at White's center with a later ...c6–c5, it will come at the cost of a tempo.

The Pirc Defense (1...d6) and the Modern Defense (1...g6) are hypermodern openings in which Black concedes the center to White in the early stages with the intention of attacking it later. These two openings can transpose into each other, the main line of the Pirc being 1.e4 d6 2.d4 Nf6 3.Nc3 g6. Usually the term "Modern Defense" is used to refer to lines in which Black delays ...Ng8–f6 or develops the night to e7 or h6 instead.

Alekhine's Defense (1...Nf6) and the Scandinavian Defense (1...d5) have made occasional appearances in World Chess Championship games. The Nimzowitsch Defense (1...Nc6) is playable but rare, as is Owen's Defense (1...b6).

The Borg Defense (1...g5?!), favored by British IM Michael Basman, and the St. George Defense (1...a6) are oddities, although Tony Miles once used St. George's Defense to defeat then World Champion Anatoly Karpov. Other replies are almost never seen in serious games and are rarely covered by standard opening references.

== List ==
- 1.e4 a5 (Corn Stalk Defense)
- 1.e4 a6 (St. George Defence)
- 1.e4 Na6 (Lemming Defense)
- 1.e4 b6 (Owen's Defence)
- 1.e4 c5 (Sicilian Defense)
- 1.e4 c6 (Caro-Kann Defense)
- 1.e4 Nc6 (Nimzowitch Defense)
- 1.e4 d5 (Scandinavian Defense)
- 1.e4 d6 2.d4 f5 (Balogh Defense)
- 1.e4 d6 2.d4 Nf6 3.Nc3 c6 (Czech Defense)
- 1.e4 d6 2.d4 Nf6 3.Nc3 g6 (Pirc Defense)
- 1.e4 e6 (French Defense)
- 1.e4 f5 (Fred Defense)
- 1.e4 f6 (Barnes Defence)
- 1.e4 Nf6 (Alehkine's Defense)
- 1.e4 g5 (Borg Opening)
- 1.e4 g6 (Modern Defense)
- 1.e4 h5 (Goldsmith Defense)
- 1.e4 h6 (Carr Defense)
- 1.e4 Nh6 (Adams Defense)

== See also ==
- Open Game (1.e4 e5)
- Closed Game (1.d4 d5)
- Semi-Closed Game (1.d4 other)
- Flank opening (1.c4, 1.Nf3, 1.f4, and others)
- Irregular chess opening
