= Robatsch =

Robatsch is an Austrian surname. Notable people with the surname include:

- Karl Robatsch (1929–2000), Austrian chess player and botanist
  - Robatsch defence, also known as the Modern Defense, hypermodern chess opening named after the player
- Jannik Robatsch (born 2004), Austrian footballer
