= Sokolsky Opening =

Chess opening

Position: a8 black rook, b8 black knight, c8 black bishop, d8 black queen, e8 black king, f8 black bishop, g8 black knight, h8 black rook, a7 black pawn, b7 black pawn, c7 black pawn, d7 black pawn, e7 black pawn, f7 black pawn, g7 black pawn, h7 black pawn, b4 white pawn, a2 white pawn, c2 white pawn, d2 white pawn, e2 white pawn, f2 white pawn, g2 white pawn, h2 white pawn, a1 white rook, b1 white knight, c1 white bishop, d1 white queen, e1 white king, f1 white bishop, g1 white knight, h1 white rook
- Moves: 1.b4
- ECO: A00
- Named after: Alexei Pavlovich Sokolsky
- Synonyms: Orangutan Opening; Polish Opening

The Sokolsky Opening, also known as the Orangutan Opening and the Polish Opening, is an uncommon chess opening that begins with the move:

1. b4

According to various databases, out of the twenty possible first moves for White, the move 1.b4 ranks ninth in popularity. It is considered an irregular opening, and along with several other uncommon first moves for White it is classified under the code A00 in the Encyclopaedia of Chess Openings.

== Origins ==
One of the earliest opening plays of b4 was by Bernhard Fleissig playing against Carl Schlechter in 1893, although Fleissig was handily defeated in just 18 moves. Nikolai Bugaev defeated former world champion Wilhelm Steinitz with it in a simul exhibition game, and later published an analysis of the opening in 1903 in a Russian magazine article. Savielly Tartakower defeated Richard Réti using b4 in a match in 1919 when both were top-level players, and Reti himself defeated Abraham Speijer in Scheveningen 1923 using the opening.

The most famous use came in a game between Tartakower and Géza Maróczy at the New York 1924 chess tournament on March 21, 1924. The name "Orangutan" originates from that game: the players visited the Bronx Zoo the previous day, where Tartakower consulted an orangutan named Susan. She somehow indicated, Tartakower insisted, that he should open with b4. Also, Tartakower was impressed with the climbing skills of the orangutan, and thought that the "climb" of the b-pawn was similar. In that particular game, Tartakower came out of the opening with a decent position, but the game was ultimately drawn.

The opening received sporadic play in the decades that followed. Tartakower had more success in 1926 when he used it against Edgard Colle for a victory. One of the most notable proponents was the Soviet player Alexei Pavlovich Sokolsky (1908–1969), who often used it in high-level play. Sokolsky wrote a monograph on the opening in 1963, Debyut 1 b2–b4, which would lead to the opening being called the "Sokolsky Opening". Sokolsky's work defended the viability of the opening even at the highest levels of professional play.

The final name, and the one used in contemporary books and chess websites such as Chess.com and Lichess, is the Polish Opening. This is by analogy to the Polish Defence (1.d4 b5), where Black's queen knight pawn is advanced two squares.

== Notable later usage ==
In general, the opening is not popular at the top level. Alexander Alekhine, who played in the same 1924 New York tournament as Tartakower, wrote that the problem is that it reveals White's intentions before White knows what Black's intentions are. That said, it still sees sporadic use among top-level grandmasters (GMs). Boris Spassky used it against Vasily Smyslov in a 1960 match, albeit having to settle for a draw. In May 2021, world champion Magnus Carlsen essayed the opening against GMs Hikaru Nakamura and Wesley So in the online FTX Crypto Cup rapid tournament.

== Analysis ==
Position: a8 black rook, b8 black knight, c8 black bishop, d8 black queen, e8 black king, g8 black knight, h8 black rook, a7 black pawn, b7 black pawn, c7 black pawn, d7 black pawn, f7 black pawn, g7 black pawn, h7 black pawn, e5 white bishop, b4 black bishop, a2 white pawn, c2 white pawn, d2 white pawn, e2 white pawn, f2 white pawn, g2 white pawn, h2 white pawn, a1 white rook, b1 white knight, d1 white queen, e1 white king, f1 white bishop, g1 white knight, h1 white rook

After 1.b4 e5 2.Bb2 Bxb4 3.Bxe5 (Exchange Variation)

The opening is largely based upon tactics on the queenside or the f6- and g7-squares. Black can respond in a variety of ways.

- 1...e5 makes a claim on the centre. White normally plays 2.Bb2, when 2...d6, 2...f6, and 2...Bxb4 are all playable. 2.a3, a reversed St. George Defence, is an alternative for White.
- 1...d5 also makes a claim to the centre, but without exposing the pawn to an attack from the bishop. After 2.Bb2, one possibility is 2...Qd6, attacking b4 and supporting ...e7–e5.
- 1...Nf6 could lead to a variety of setups, including a King's Indian style setup with ...g6 and ...d6, a Queen's Indian setup with ...e6 and ...b6, or a solid Queen's Gambit setup with ...e6 and ...d5.
- 1...e6 is similarly transpositional.
- 1...f5 announces Black's intention to play a Dutch Defence setup.
- 1...c6, called the Outflank Variation, is often played with the intention of ...Qb6 or ...a5.
- 1...a5, immediately challenging the b4-pawn, was suggested by Ludek Pachman; however, Sokolsky criticises it as a waste of time since White often wants to play b4–b5 in any case.
- 1...c5 is a sharp gambit normally used to avoid theory. After the capture Black will generally place pressure on the c5-square and will develop an attack against White's weak queenside structure.

== See also ==
- List of chess openings
- List of chess openings named after people

== Bibliography ==
- Dunnington, Angus (2000). Winning Unorthodox Openings. Everyman Chess. ISBN 978-1-85744-285-4.
- Hansen, Carsten (2021). Play the Orangutan 1.b4!. CarstenChess. ISBN 978-87-93812-64-2.
- Konikowski, Jerzy; Soszynski, Marek (2009). The Sokolsky Opening 1.b4 in Theory & Practice. Russell Enterprises. ISBN 978-1-888690-65-1.
- Lapshun, Yury; Conticello, Nick (2008). Play 1b4!: Shock your opponents with the Sokolsky. Everyman Chess. ISBN 978-1-85744-560-2.
- Schiller, Eric (2002). Unorthodox Chess Openings (Second ed.). Cardoza Publishing. pp. 354–57. ISBN 1-58042-072-9.
