= Owen's Defence =

Chess opening

Position: a8 black rook, b8 black knight, c8 black bishop, d8 black queen, e8 black king, f8 black bishop, g8 black knight, h8 black rook, a7 black pawn, c7 black pawn, d7 black pawn, e7 black pawn, f7 black pawn, g7 black pawn, h7 black pawn, b6 black pawn, e4 white pawn, a2 white pawn, b2 white pawn, c2 white pawn, d2 white pawn, f2 white pawn, g2 white pawn, h2 white pawn, a1 white rook, b1 white knight, c1 white bishop, d1 white queen, e1 white king, f1 white bishop, g1 white knight, h1 white rook
- Moves: 1.e4 b6
- ECO: B00
- Origin: 1619
- Named after: Rev. John Owen
- Parent: King's Pawn Opening
- Synonym: Queen's Fianchetto Defence

Owen's Defence (also known as the Queen's Fianchetto Defence) is an uncommon chess opening defined by the moves:

1. e4 b6

Named after John Owen, this opening is also frequently reached with the move order 1.d4 b6 2.e4. By playing 1...b6, Black prepares the fianchetto of the queen's bishop where it participates in the battle for the centre. The downside of this plan is that White can occupy the centre with pawns and gain a spatial advantage. Moreover, 1...b6 does not prepare kingside castling as 1...g6 does, and it is harder for Black to augment their pressure against the centre with ...f5, which weakens the kingside, than it is to play the corresponding move ...c5 after 1...g6. Owen's Defence accordingly has a dubious reputation.

Owen's Defence is classified as code B00 by the Encyclopaedia of Chess Openings.

== History ==
The 17th-century writings of Gioachino Greco contain three games featuring 1.e4 b6 2.d4 Bb7.

The first master-strength player to employ 1.e4 b6 on a regular basis was the 19th-century vicar and strong amateur chess player John Owen, the namesake of the opening. Owen seems to have used 1.e4 b6 as his main defence for the majority of his career, including in two games against Paul Morphy in 1858 (scoring one win and one loss).

In 1889, Owen's Defence was played seven times by Isidor Gunsberg at the US Chess Congress (scoring +4−1=2), but the opening was otherwise a very rare visitor in master level chess until the 1970s when it was adopted by freethinkers such as Bent Larsen and Michael Basman. In more recent times Owen's Defence has been played with some regularity by grandmasters (GMs) Pavel Blatny, Artashes Minasian, Nona Gaprindashvili, Tony Miles, Edvīns Ķeņģis and Normunds Miezis, and by International Masters (IMs) Bauer, Bricard and Filipovic. The opening remains rare but has enjoyed a certain amount of popularity in top-level online blitz tournaments, including in games by Alireza Firouzja, Magnus Carlsen, Hikaru Nakamura, Ian Nepomniachtchi and Teimour Radjabov.

== Theory ==
The theory of Owen's Defence is less developed than that of other openings. This makes it attractive to some players, because their opponents may often be ill-prepared for it and hence forced to think for themselves. GM Christian Bauer observes:

To be honest, I don't think Black can equalise as quickly with 1...b6 as he sometimes does in standard openings, and he may suffer against a well-prepared opponent. Then again, the well-prepared opponent is rare for such marginal variations as 1...b6, and in any case, with reasonable play I'm sure White can't get more than a slight advantage from the opening – a risk everyone is running as Black, aren't they?

Position: a8 black rook, b8 black knight, d8 black queen, e8 black king, f8 black bishop, g8 black knight, h8 black rook, a7 black pawn, b7 black bishop, d7 black pawn, f7 black pawn, g7 black pawn, h7 black pawn, b6 black pawn, e6 black pawn, c5 black pawn, d4 white pawn, e4 white pawn, c3 white pawn, d3 white bishop, f3 white knight, a2 white pawn, b2 white pawn, f2 white pawn, g2 white pawn, h2 white pawn, a1 white rook, b1 white knight, c1 white bishop, d1 white queen, e1 white king, h1 white rook

Position after 5.c3

After 1. e4 b6 2. d4 Bb7 the mainline has historically been 3. Bd3 e6 4. Nf3 (4.c4 would transpose to the English Defence) c5 5. c3 (diagram), after which MCO-15 gives clear advantage to White after either 5...Nf6 6.Nbd2 Nc6 7.a3! d5 8.e5 Nfd7 9.b4 Be7 10.0-0 0-0 11.Re1, or 5...cxd4 6.cxd4 Bb4+ 7.Nc3 Nf6 8.Qe2 d5 9.e5 Ne4 10.0-0!? Bxc3 11.bxc3 Nxc3 12.Qe3 Nc6 13.Bb2 Ne4 14.Ba3 Adams–Vanderwaeren, Moscow Olympiad 1994.

GM John Shaw has suggested that White may fare even better by opting for 5.Nc3 after which Black has little option but to play ...cxd4 (either immediately or in the next few moves) transposing into an unorthodox type of Open Sicilian where Black has played an early ...b6/...Bb7.

According to IM Lawrence Trent, 4...c5 has "generally been almost refuted by cloud engines". He therefore suggests that Black may be better off exploring the sideline 4...d5. Possibilities offered by Trent include 5.e5 Ba6, which gives an Advance French-type structure where Black can swiftly exchange off his bad bishop, and 5.exd5 Qxd5 6.Nc3 Qd8 where the structure might be taken to resemble either an unusual form of Qd8 Scandinavian or a rare type of Exchange French where Black had recaptured with the queen to keep the pawn structure asymmetrical (i.e. 1.e4 e6 2.d4 d5 3.exd5 Qxd5!?).

Position: a8 black rook, b8 black knight, d8 black queen, e8 black king, f8 black bishop, h8 black rook, a7 black pawn, b7 black bishop, d7 black knight, f7 black pawn, g7 black pawn, h7 black pawn, b6 black pawn, e6 black pawn, c5 black pawn, d5 black pawn, e5 white pawn, d4 white pawn, d3 white bishop, f3 white knight, a2 white pawn, b2 white pawn, c2 white pawn, e2 white queen, f2 white pawn, g2 white pawn, h2 white pawn, a1 white rook, b1 white knight, c1 white bishop, f1 white rook, g1 white king

Position after 7...c5, French-type handling of the opening

Position: a8 black rook, b8 black knight, e8 black king, h8 black rook, a7 black pawn, b7 black bishop, c7 black pawn, d7 black pawn, f7 black pawn, g7 black pawn, b6 black pawn, e6 black pawn, f6 black queen, h6 black pawn, d4 white pawn, e4 white pawn, c3 white pawn, d3 white bishop, f3 white knight, a2 white pawn, c2 white pawn, f2 white pawn, g2 white pawn, h2 white pawn, a1 white rook, d1 white queen, e1 white king, h1 white rook

Position after 8...Qxf6

German opening theoretician FM Klaus Gewehns considered much of the complex after 3.Bd3 e6 to be dangerous for Black and instead concentrated on 3... Nf6 (as often played by Owen's Defence specialist Pavel Blatny), the most frequently played continuation here is 4. Qe2 e6 5. Nf3 d5 6. e5 Nfd7 7. 0-0 c5 (see diagram), another French-type handling of the opening.

The main 3rd move alternative for White has been to defend the e4-pawn with 3. Nc3, after which a typical continuation would be 3... e6 4. Nf3 Bb4 5. Bd3 Nf6 6. Bg5 h6 7. Bxf6 Bxc3+ 8. bxc3 Qxf6 (diagram), MCO-15 now gives advantage to White following 9.0-0 d6 10.Nd2 e5 11.f4 Qe7 12.Qg4, as in David–Bauer, France 2005.

Instead of playing 3...e6, Black may also transpose into the Hippopotamus Defence by playing 3...g6 and 4...Bg7, attaining a double fianchetto formation. This approach was used by GM Boris Spassky in games 12 and 16 of his 1966 World Championship match against the then World Champion Tigran Petrosian; Spassky drew both games. It had been developed and played by the Slovak IM Maximilián Ujtelky a few years before this. If White plays 3.Bd3 g6 4.f4 Andrew Martin considers 4...f5! to be strong, citing the game Serpik–Blatny, U.S. Open 2003.

Greco vs. NN, 1619

Position: a8 black rook, b8 black knight, d8 black queen, e8 black king, f8 black bishop, g8 black knight, h8 black rook, a7 black pawn, c7 black pawn, d7 black pawn, e7 black pawn, h7 black pawn, b6 black pawn, g6 white pawn, h5 white queen, d4 white pawn, d3 white bishop, a2 white pawn, b2 white pawn, c2 white pawn, f2 white pawn, g2 black bishop, h2 white pawn, a1 white rook, b1 white knight, c1 white bishop, e1 white king, g1 white knight, h1 white rook

Position after 6.fxg6

After 1. e4 b6 2. d4 Bb7 3. Bd3, the direct 3... f5? is "simply suicidal" according to Bauer. In the 17th century Greco had already given the line 4. exf5! Bxg2 5. Qh5+ g6 6. fxg6 (diagram) Nf6?? 7.gxh7+ Nxh5 8.Bg6#. A better move for Black is 6... Bg7, but White is winning after 7.Qf5! Nf6 8.Bh6!!, or the "clearer" 7. gxh7+ Kf8 8. Nf3 (8.Nh3 is recommended by Jan Gustafsson and Vjekoslav Nemec in their Chessable course Gustafsson's Aggressive 1.e4 – Part 1. They analyse 8...Nf6 9.Qg6 Bxh1 [or 9...Bxh3 10.Rg1 Rxh7 11.Qg3] 10.Bh6 Rxh7 11.Ng5, and "Black is getting mated shortly.") Nf6 (8...Bxf3? 9.Qxf3+ Nf6 10.Qxa8; 8...Bxh1 9.Ne5 Bxe5 10.dxe5 Bd5 11.hxg8=Q+ Kxg8 12.Qg6+ Kf8 13.Bh6+) 9. Qg6 Bxf3 (9...Bxh1 10.Bh6 Rxh7 11.Ng5 Bxh6 12.Nxh7+ Nxh7 13.Qxh6+) 10. Rg1 Rxh7 11 .Qg3! Be4 12. Bxe4 Nxe4 13. Qf3+ Kg8 14. Qxe4 with an extra pawn and safer king for White.

== Guatemala Defence ==
Position: a8 black rook, b8 black knight, d8 black queen, e8 black king, f8 black bishop, g8 black knight, h8 black rook, a7 black pawn, c7 black pawn, d7 black pawn, e7 black pawn, f7 black pawn, g7 black pawn, h7 black pawn, a6 black bishop, b6 black pawn, d4 white pawn, e4 white pawn, a2 white pawn, b2 white pawn, c2 white pawn, f2 white pawn, g2 white pawn, h2 white pawn, a1 white rook, b1 white knight, c1 white bishop, d1 white queen, e1 white king, f1 white bishop, g1 white knight, h1 white rook

With 1.e4 b6 2.d4 Ba6, Black offers a trade of light-squared bishops.

After 1.e4 b6 2.d4, instead of 2...Bb7, the move 2...Ba6 is known as the Guatemala Defence. This opening was invented by a Guatemalan named Roberto Asturias, and further investigated by his compatriots including David Vela and Hans Cohn. Joel Benjamin and Eric Schiller see some logic in Black's concept to exchange White's light-squared bishop as soon as possible, as it often proves troublesome for Black in many openings. Andrew Soltis writes that it has "no other discernible benefit than to get out of 'book' as quickly as possible".

== Illustrative games ==
Speelman vs. Basman, 1984

Position: d8 black queen, g8 black king, a7 black rook, c7 black pawn, d7 black pawn, e7 black bishop, f7 black rook, h7 black pawn, a6 black pawn, b6 black pawn, c6 black knight, g6 black pawn, h6 white bishop, d5 white queen, f5 black pawn, h5 white knight, a4 white pawn, e3 white rook, b2 white pawn, c2 white pawn, f2 white pawn, g2 white pawn, h2 white pawn, e1 white rook, g1 white king

Final position after 20.Rge3

Speelman vs. Basman, British Championship 1984:
1. e4 e6 2. Nc3 b6 3. d4 Bb7 transposing to a position more commonly reached by 1.e4 b6 2.d4 Bb7 3.Nc3 e6. 4. Bd3 Nf6 5. Nge2 c5 6. d5! a6 6...exd5 7.exd5 Nxd5 8.Nxd5 Bxd5 9.Nf4 Bc6 (9...Be6? 10.Be4 wins; 9...Qe7+!?) 10.Bc4! "gives White strong pressure". 7. a4 exd5 8. exd5 Nxd5 9. Nxd5 Bxd5 10. Nf4 Be6 11. Be4 Ra7 12. 0-0 Be7 Watson and Schiller also give 12...g6 13.a5! as favouring White after 13...bxa5 14.Bd2 or 13...b5 14.Be3 d6 15.b4 Be7 16.Nxe6 fxe6 17.Qg4 Qc8 18.bxc5 dxc5 19.Bh6, intending Rad1, Rfe1, and h4–h5 "with great pressure for just a pawn". 13. Ra3 0-0 14. Rg3 f5 15. Bd5 Rf6? Better is 15...Bxd5!? 16.Qxd5+ Rf7 17.Nh5 with a strong attack. 16. Re1 Bxd5 17. Qxd5+ Rf7 18. Nh5 g6 19. Bh6 Nc6 20. Rge3 (diagram) 1–0. White threatens both 21.Rxe7! Nxe7 22.Nf6+ Kh8 23.Qxf7 and 21.Nf6+! Bxf6 (21...Kh8 22.Qxf7) 22.Re8+. On 20...gxh5, 21.Rg3+ wins; 20...Bf8 21.Re8 gxh5 23.Bxf8!; 20...Ra8 21.Rxe7! Nxe7 and now either 22.Rxe7 Qxe7 23.Qxa8+ or 22.Nf6+ Kh8 23.Qxf7 wins.

== Bibliography ==
- Bauer, Christian. Play 1...b6 (Everyman Chess, 2005).
- Coles, Nevil. Owen's Defence, chapter 19 (pp. 112–120) in the 1977 & 1978 impressions of Nimzowitsch/Larsen Attack by Keene, R. (Batsford, 1977). Absent from subsequent reprints.
- Gawehns, Klaus. Theorie und Praxis: Owen-Verteidigung (Part I in Kaissiber 30, pp. 20–42, Part II in Kaissiber 32, pp. 45–61, both 2008, ISBNs 4194305406103/80030 & 4194305406103/80032).
- Lakdawala, Cyrus. 1...b6: Move by Move (Everyman Chess, 2014).
- Odessky, Ilya. 'Winning quickly with 1.b3 and 1...b6 (New In Chess, 2020).
- Trent, Lawrence. 1...b6 Against Everything (Chessable.com, 2021).

== See also ==
- List of chess openings
- List of chess openings named after people
