= Polish Defense =

Chess openings

Position: a8 black rook, b8 black knight, c8 black bishop, d8 black queen, e8 black king, f8 black bishop, g8 black knight, h8 black rook, a7 black pawn, c7 black pawn, d7 black pawn, e7 black pawn, f7 black pawn, g7 black pawn, h7 black pawn, b5 black pawn, d4 white pawn, a2 white pawn, b2 white pawn, c2 white pawn, e2 white pawn, f2 white pawn, g2 white pawn, h2 white pawn, a1 white rook, b1 white knight, c1 white bishop, d1 white queen, e1 white king, f1 white bishop, g1 white knight, h1 white rook
- Moves: 1.d4 b5
- ECO: A40
- Origin: Kuhn vs. Wagner A., Swiss Corr. Ch. (1913)
- Named after: Polish Opening
- Parent: Queen's Pawn Game

The Polish Defense is the name commonly given to one of several sequences of chess opening moves characterized by an early ...b5 by Black. The name "Polish Defense" is given by analogy to the Polish Opening, 1.b4. The original line was

1. d4 b5

as played by Alexander Wagner, a Polish player and openings analyst, against Kuhn in the 1913 Swiss Correspondence Championship. Wagner published an analysis of the opening in Deutsches Wochenschach in 1914, when he was living in Stanislau, Galicia, Austria-Hungary (now Ivano-Frankivsk, Ukraine).

Later the name was also applied to

1. d4 Nf6
2. Nf3 b5

and other lines in which Black plays an early ...b7–b5, which are sometimes called the Polish Defense Deferred.

== Details ==
With ...b5, Black tries to take control of c4, but 1.d4 b5 is generally considered dubious after 2.e4, threatening 3.Bxb5. Modern Chess Openings (MCO-14, 1999) allots two columns to the Polish, commenting that the variants where Black waits and plays 2...b5 instead of 1...b5 are much safer. Earlier editions of MCO give only a single column of analysis and consider only the 2...b5 lines. MCO-9 (1957) states that the Polish "fails because it neglects the centre". That negative verdict was softened in the next edition, MCO-10 (1965), to say that the Polish "neglects the centre, but is not refuted". MCO-12 (1982) retains the "not refuted" assessment and notes that the Polish can result by transposition from the Réti system. Other judgments have been harsher. The 1...b5 Polish was deemed "entirely valueless" by I. A. Horowitz in 1964. The Polish is closely related to the St. George Defence (1.e4 a6, usually followed by 2.d4 b5) into which it often transposes. Boris Spassky played 1.d4 b5 against Tigran Petrosian in the decisive 22nd game of their world championship match in 1966. Spassky equalized, but rejected an opportunity to draw, as he was behind by a point in the match and with at most three games remaining, he was practically forced to play for a win. Petrosian won the game, thus ensuring retention of his title.

1...b5?! against the English Opening is known as the Halibut Gambit (or Jaenisch Gambit).

Position: a8 black rook, b8 black knight, c8 black bishop, d8 black queen, e8 black king, f8 black bishop, h8 black rook, a7 black pawn, c7 black pawn, d7 black pawn, e7 black pawn, f7 black pawn, g7 black pawn, h7 black pawn, f6 black knight, b5 black pawn, f3 white knight, g3 white pawn, a2 white pawn, b2 white pawn, c2 white pawn, d2 white pawn, e2 white pawn, f2 white pawn, h2 white pawn, a1 white rook, b1 white knight, c1 white bishop, d1 white queen, e1 white king, f1 white bishop, h1 white rook

After 1.Nf3 Nf6 2.g3 b5

=== ...b5 in response to Nf3 and g3 ===
The Polish can be used to combat certain variations of the Réti Opening or King's Indian Attack. In particular, 1.Nf3 Nf6 2.g3 b5, sometimes called the Spassky Variation after its use by Boris Spassky in the 1966 World Championship match against Tigran Petrosian, is a fully respectable opening that has been successfully played by several grandmasters including former world champions Mikhail Tal, Anatoly Karpov and Magnus Carlsen. It prepares to fianchetto Black's queen bishop and prevents White from playing the otherwise desirable c4. White's second move commits to fianchettoing the king bishop rather than developing it along the f1–a6 diagonal, due to the weakness that would result on the long diagonal.

A related line, into which this can transpose, is 1.d4 Nf6 2.Nf3 e6 3.g3 b5. In both of these lines Black reacts to White's Ng1–f3 and g2–g3 by contesting the fianchetto on the h1–a8 diagonal and gaining some space on the queen's side, taking the view that b7–b5 is superior to b7–b6.

After 1.Nf3 Nf6 2.g3 b5 play typically continues 3.Bg2 Bb7 4.0-0 e6 and White now has a choice of setups. 5.d4 transposes into the 1.d4 Nf6 2.Nf3 e6 3.g3 b5 line mentioned above, 5.d3 usually leads to a King's Indian Attack setup after the follow up e2–e4 (though c2–c4 and other setups are also possible), while 5.b3 is a more offbeat try. An alternative plan for White is to contest Black's queen's side expansion with an early a2–a4 or Nb1–a3.

== See also ==
- List of chess openings
- List of chess openings named after places
- "The Chess Moves 1 b4 and 1...b5" by Edward Winter
