= Brandon Clarke (chess player) =

English chess player (born 1995)

Personal information
- Born: 14 December 1995 (age 30) Leicester, England

Chess career
- Country: England
- Title: International Master (2019)
- FIDE rating: 2468 (July 2026)
- Peak rating: 2500 (May 2024)

Brandon George Isaac Clarke is an English chess player.

== Chess career ==
Clarke began playing chess at age 8, and has represented England in European & World Chess Championships.

Clarke has won the 2006 and 2007 London U12 championships. In 2012, he won the UK Chess Challenge.

In January 2019, Clarke won the 126th New Zealand Open ahead of Timur Gareyev and Darryl Johansen. He then won the 2019 FIDE Open.

In April 2022, Clarke had the best result for England in the Reykjavik Open.

In August 2023, Clarke participated in the Major Open tournament of the British Chess Championship, where he found a cross-pin move against Kajus Mikalajunas.

== Personal life ==
Clarke studied at Wellington College, Berkshire and BPP Holdings and has been a chess coach in Orange County, California, United States and Sydney, Australia. He has travelled to and won tournaments in Australia and New Zealand.
