= Chessington Computer Centre =

Administration services organization based in Chessington, UK

Chessington Computer Centre was an organisation based in Chessington that provided administration services to the UK Government. Originally part of central government, it became an executive agency and trading fund of the Cabinet Office on 1 April 1993. In July 1996 it was sold to a management and employee buy-out team for £12.5 million. It was acquired by Automatic Data Processing in September 1998, but was later closed in June 2005.

The chess player Michael Basman worked at the Chessington Computer Centre as a computer programmer.
