= Alexander Wagner =

Polish chess correspondence master and theoretician (1868-1942)

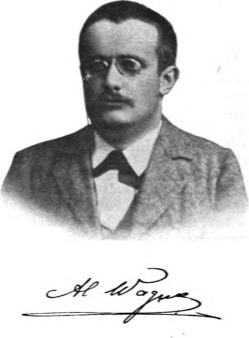
Alexander Wagner

Alexander (Aleksander) Wagner (7 August 1868 – 1942) was a Polish chess correspondence master and theoretician.

He studied law in Lemberg (Lwów, Lviv), playing chess in the Lviv Chess Club. He took 4th at Lviv 1895 and 6th at Lviv 1896, both won by Ignatz von Popiel, tied for 6-7th at Berlin 1897 (Arpad Bauer won), tied for 7-8th at Berlin 1903 (Horatio Caro won), and tied for 5-8th at Berlin 1905 (Erich Cohn won). In that time, he published an article Das Schachspiel in Polen in the Österreichische Lesehalle. After study, he worked in railway administration in Lvow. Then he moved to Khodoriv, and next settled in Stanislau, Galicia (then Austria-Hungary, next Poland, now Ukraine). He played in local and international correspondence chess tournaments, and published many theoretical analysis in chess magazines.

In February 1912, he published an article A New Gambit. The Swiss Gambit. (1.f4 f5 2.e4 fxe4, 3.Nc3 Nf6, 4.g4) in the Schweizerische Schachzeitung. He introduced in practice, along with Swiss Gambit (1.f4 f5 2.e4), Polish Defense (1.d4 b5) and Lemberg Gambit, also known as Tennison Gambit or Abonyi Gambit, (1.Nf3 d5 2.e4).
