= Hippopotamus Defence =

Chess opening

Position: a8 black rook, d8 black queen, e8 black king, h8 black rook, b7 black bishop, c7 black pawn, d7 black knight, e7 black knight, f7 black pawn, g7 black bishop, a6 black pawn, b6 black pawn, d6 black pawn, e6 black pawn, g6 black pawn, h6 black pawn, a2 white pawn, b2 white pawn, c2 white pawn, d2 white pawn, e2 white pawn, f2 white pawn, g2 white pawn, h2 white pawn, a1 white rook, b1 white knight, c1 white bishop, d1 white queen, e1 white king, f1 white bishop, g1 white knight, h1 white rook
Basic Hippopotamus structure for Black

The Hippopotamus Defence is a chess opening system employed by Black, consisting of a double fianchetto structure (bishops on b7 and g7) and a small pawn centre (pawns on d6 and e6). The knights are typically developed to e7 and d7 and the rook's pawns to a6 and h6. This structure can be obtained by a wide variety of move orders but it occurs most frequently via the Modern Defence (1.e4 g6) or Owen's Defence (1.e4 b6). The Hippopotamus can also be played against queen's pawn openings or flank openings and is thus a genuinely universal system. The same structure is also occasionally used by White.

== History ==
The first master strength player to experiment with Hippopotamus-type structures appears to have been the Slovak International Master Maximilián Ujtelky. The opening first came to public prominence, however, after being adopted twice by Boris Spassky in his 1966 World Championship match against Tigran Petrosian (after which the setup was dubbed the "Hippopotamus" by commentators). Spassky would appear to have been influenced by his 1964 game against Ujtelky, where he faced the same setup that he would later employ against Petrosian.

Prominent players to have adopted the Hippopotamus on an occasional basis in more recent years include Vlastimil Hort, Igor Glek, Mihai Șubă, Tony Miles, Gata Kamsky, Pavel Blatny and Luke McShane. Meanwhile, Kiril Georgiev and Hikaru Nakamura have used the system as an anti-computer line. Other players to have adopted the Hippopotamus include Aron Nimzowitsch, Garry Kasparov and Magnus Carlsen.

== Analysis ==
Typical position in the Hippopotamus

Position: a8 black rook, d8 black queen, e8 black king, h8 black rook, b7 black bishop, c7 black pawn, d7 black knight, e7 black knight, f7 black pawn, g7 black bishop, a6 black pawn, b6 black pawn, d6 black pawn, e6 black pawn, g6 black pawn, h6 black pawn, c4 white bishop, d4 white pawn, e4 white pawn, f4 white bishop, c3 white knight, f3 white knight, a2 white pawn, b2 white pawn, c2 white pawn, e2 white queen, f2 white pawn, g2 white pawn, h2 white pawn, d1 white rook, e1 white rook, g1 white king

White to move

While Black sets up the Hippopotamus structure White is able to develop freely. If White proceeds in accordance with classical principles a position will arise similar to that shown in the diagram. Black has adopted the complete Hippopotamus setup with pawns on a6, b6, d6, e6, g6 and h6, fianchettoed bishops on b7 and g7, and knights on d7 and e7. White, meanwhile, has occupied the centre with pawns, developed the minor pieces to central positions, castled and centralised rooks. Despite having achieved an ideal classical development White now faces a dilemma in terms of how to proceed, as Black has pawn control of every square on the fifth rank (a5–h5). White can thus only make headway by advancing a pawn into Black’s side of the board.

=== Pawn structure types ===
Position: c7 black pawn, f7 black pawn, a6 black pawn, b6 black pawn, e6 black pawn, g6 black pawn, h6 black pawn, d5 black pawn, e5 white pawn, d4 white pawn, a2 white pawn, b2 white pawn, c2 white pawn, f2 white pawn, g2 white pawn, h2 white pawn

French-type (with ...c5 to follow)

Position: c7 black pawn, f7 black pawn, a6 black pawn, b6 black pawn, d6 black pawn, g6 black pawn, h6 black pawn, d5 white pawn, e5 black pawn, e4 white pawn, a2 white pawn, b2 white pawn, c2 white pawn, f2 white pawn, g2 white pawn, h2 white pawn

King's Indian-type (with ...f5 to follow)

If White should advance e4–e5, Black will typically lock the central pawns with ...d6–d5. This gives rise to a central pawn structure similar to that seen in many lines of the French Defence. Black will then proceed with the typical French pawn break ...c7–c5 and thematic queenside play.

Returning to the diagram position, if White should instead advance d4–d5, Black will again respond by locking the central pawns, this time with ...e6–e5. The structure then resembles that seen in many lines of the King's Indian Defence. Black will likely proceed with either (a) the thematic King’s Indian pawn break ...f7–f5 (usually following ...0-0), or (b) the typical Hippo idea of ...g6–g5 and ...Ne7–g6–f4, either of which plans may result in a kingside attack. Note that in positions where White intends to play d4–d5 the White queen would usually be deployed to d2 rather than e2 (thus avoiding the possibility of Black doubling White's pawns by responding to d4–d5 with ...Bg7xNc3).

Position: f7 black pawn, a6 black pawn, b6 black pawn, d6 black pawn, e6 black pawn, g6 black pawn, h6 black pawn, e4 white pawn, a2 white pawn, b2 white pawn, c2 white pawn, f2 white pawn, g2 white pawn, h2 white pawn

Sicilian-type

Position: f7 black pawn, a6 black pawn, b6 black pawn, d6 black pawn, e6 black pawn, g6 black pawn, h6 black pawn, c5 black pawn, d5 white pawn, e4 white pawn, a2 white pawn, b2 white pawn, c2 white pawn, f2 white pawn, g2 white pawn, h2 white pawn

Benoni-type (with ...e6xd5 or ...e5 to follow)

If White opts against playing either e4–e5 or d4–d5, Black may begin to advance against the castled White king with moves such as ...g6–g5, ...Ng6, etc. (or, if White had castled queenside, ...b6–b5, ...Nb6, etc.). Alternatively Black might play the pawn break ...c7–c5, after which the structure may transform to resemble a Sicilian (following a later ...c5xd4 or d4xc5) or a Benoni (following a later d4–d5).

To allow the various options given above, Black’s main objective in the early stages will be to remain flexible, including by delaying any decision about castling until after the central pawn structure has been defined.

The Hippopotamus can be considered an anti-theory opening, with Black’s play tending to rely on a thematic understanding of the major chess openings mentioned above rather than on specific opening variations or move orders.

The positions arising from the Hippopotamus differ from standard positions in the French Defence, King's Indian Defence, etc., as various pawns and pieces will be displaced compared to their usual positions in those openings. For example, in the King's Indian, Black would not have fianchettoed the queen's bishop, and White would prefer to have the c-pawn on c4 rather than c2. Hippopotamus middlegames are often defined by how the players navigate these differences and attempt to turn them to their own advantage or their opponent's disadvantage.

While White can be expected to obtain a space advantage in most variations of the Hippopotamus Defence, Black will often have a practical advantage due to greater familiarity with the various transpositional possibilities in this rare opening complex. White must also be wary of playing in too aggressive a fashion or of overextending, after which the dynamism of Black's seemingly passive structure may quickly become apparent (see, for example, Barczay vs. Ivkov, below).

== Illustrative games ==
- Boris Spassky vs. Maximilian Ujtelky, Sochi 1964
  1.e4 g6 2.d4 Bg7 3.Nc3 a6 4.Nf3 d6 5.Bc4 e6 6.Bg5 Ne7 7.a4 h6 8.Be3 b6 9.0-0 Nd7 10.Re1 0-0 11.Qd2 Kh7 12.Rad1 Bb7 13.Qe2 Qc8 14.Bf4 Rd8 15.h4 Nf8 16.Bb3 f6 17.Nb1 e5 18.Bc1 Ne6 19.c3 Rf8 20.Na3 f5? 21.dxe5 dxe5 22.Nxe5! Bxe5 23.exf5 Rxf5 24.Bc2 Rh5?? 25.Qxh5 1–0
- Tigran Petrosian vs. Boris Spassky, World Championship 1966, game 12
  1.Nf3 g6 2.c4 Bg7 3.d4 d6 4.Nc3 Nd7 5.e4 e6 6.Be2 b6 7.0-0 Bb7 8.Be3 Ne7 9.Qc2 h6 10.Rad1 0-0 11.d5 e5 12.Qc1 Kh7 13.g3 f5 14.exf5 Nxf5 15.Bd3 Bc8 16.Kg2 Nf6 17.Ne4 Nh5 18.Bd2 Bd7 19.Kh1 Ne7 20.Nh4 Bh3 21.Rg1 Bd7 22.Be3 Qe8 23.Rde1 Qf7 24.Qc2 Kh8 25.Nd2 Nf5 26.Nxf5 gxf5 27.g4 e4 28.gxh5 f4 29.Rxg7 Qxg7 30.Rg1 Qe5 31.Nf3 exd3 32.Nxe5 dxc2 33.Bd4 dxe5 34.Bxe5+ Kh7 35.Rg7+ Kh8 36.Rg6+ Kh7 37.Rg7+ Kh8 38.Rg6+ Kh7 39.Rg7+ ½–½
Petrosian–Spassky, 1966, game 16

Position: a8 black rook, d8 black queen, f8 black rook, g8 black king, b7 black bishop, c7 black pawn, d7 black knight, e7 black knight, f7 black pawn, g7 black bishop, h7 black pawn, a6 black pawn, b6 black pawn, d6 black pawn, e6 black pawn, g6 black pawn, a4 white pawn, d4 white pawn, e4 white pawn, c3 white pawn, d3 white bishop, f3 white knight, b2 white pawn, d2 white knight, f2 white pawn, g2 white pawn, h2 white pawn, a1 white rook, c1 white bishop, d1 white queen, e1 white rook, g1 white king

Position after 10...0-0
- Tigran Petrosian vs. Boris Spassky, World Championship 1966, game 16
  1.d4 g6 2.e4 Bg7 3.Nf3 d6 4.Be2 e6 5.c3 Nd7 6.0-0 Ne7 7.Nbd2 b6 8.a4 a6 9.Re1 Bb7 10.Bd3 0-0 11.Nc4 Qe8 12.Bd2 f6 13.Qe2 Kh8 14.Kh1 Qf7 15.Ng1 e5 16.dxe5 fxe5 17.f3 Nc5 18.Ne3 Qe8 19.Bc2 a5 20.Nh3 Bc8 21.Nf2 Be6 22.Qd1 Qf7 23.Ra3 Bd7 24.Nd3 Nxd3 25.Bxd3 Bh6 26.Bc4 Qg7 27.Re2 Ng8 28.Bxg8 Rxg8 29.Nd5 Bxd2 30.Rxd2 Be6 31.b4 Qf7 32.Qe2 Ra7 33.Ra1 Rf8 34.b5 Raa8 35.Qe3 Rab8 36.Rf1 Qg7 37.Qd3 Rf7 38.Kg1 Rbf8 39.Ne3 g5 40.Rdf2 h5 41.c4 Qg6 42.Nd5 Rg8 43.Qe3 Kh7 44.Qd2 Rgg7 45.Qe3 Kg8 46.Rd2 Kh7 47.Rdf2 Rf8 48.Qd2 Rgf7 49.Qe3 ½–½
- Laszlo Barczay vs. Borislav Ivkov, Sousse Interzonal 1967
  1. e4 g6 2. d4 Bg7 3. Nf3 d6 4. Bc4 a6 5. 0-0 e6 6. Bg5? Ne7 7. Qd2 h6 8. Be3 Nd7 9. Nc3 b6 10. Rfe1 Bb7 11. a4 Nf6 12. e5? Nfd5 13. Bf4 Nxc3 14. Qxc3? (14.bxc3) 0-0 15. exd6 cxd6 16. Qa3 Nf5 17. c3? (17.Rad1) Bxf3 18. gxf3 e5! 19. Bg3 h5 20. dxe5 dxe5 21. Kh1 Qg5 0–1
- Alex Baburin vs. Tony Miles, 4NCL, England 2000
  1. d4 e6 2. c4 b6 An English Defence, but it soon transposes to a Hippopotamus. 3. a3 g6 4. Nc3 Bg7 5. e4 Ne7 6. Nf3 Bb7 7. Bd3 d6 8. 0-0 Nd7 9. Re1 h6 10. h3 a6 11. Be3 g5 12. Rc1 c5 13. d5 Ng6 14. Bc2 Qe7 15. Qd2 0-0 16. Rcd1 Nde5 17. Nxe5 Bxe5 18. Bd3 Qf6 19. Na4 Rab8 20. Nxb6 Bc8 21. Na4 If 21.Nxc8 Rxb2! 22 Qa5 Rxc8 23 Qxa6 Rcb8 followed by ...Nf4 and ...Bd4. 21... Bd7 22. Nc3 Rb3 23. Rb1 Rfb8 24. Nd1 exd5 25. cxd5 Nf4 26. Bxf4 gxf4 27. Bc2 Rxh3! 28. gxh3 Kh8 29. f3 Rg8+ 30. Kh1 Qh4 0–1 (Notes by John B. Henderson). This was one of Miles's last games, and posthumously won him the "Game of the Season" award.

== See also ==
- Hedgehog Defence
- List of chess openings
