= UK Chess Challenge =

The UK Chess Challenge is an annual four-stage chess competition for school-age children from the United Kingdom. Michael Basman created the competition in 1996. The director of the tournament is Sarah Longson (née Hegarty) supported by her husband Alex Longson. Sarah is former British Ladies Chess Champion and represents England at Olympiads. Over 40,000 children play in the competition at the school stage and the eventual winner wins £2,000 and is crowned as UK Schools' Chess Challenge Champion. The competition is sponsored by Delancey.

== Stages ==
=== School ===
The first stage involves school chess clubs holding a qualifying competition to determine the strongest player for each gender-year combination, e.g. U-11 boys, U-9 girls. Each such player qualifies to enter the county Megafinal competition. For schools without chess clubs, there are alternative competitions called Last Chance Saloons that will also enable qualification to the Megafinal.

=== Megafinal ===
A one-day Megafinal is held within most UK counties to determine the strongest player from the county or local area within each gender and year combination. Each such player is titled Supremo (boys) or Suprema (girls). The top player plus all those scoring 3.5/6 or better qualify for the Gigafinal.

=== Gigafinal ===
There are usually 3 one-day Gigafinals—one for Northern counties; one for Southern counties and one for the Midlands . As with the Megafinal, each Gigafinal is held to determine the strongest player for the qualifying region within each gender / year combination. Each such player is titled Ultimo (boys) or Ultima (girls). The Ultimo / Ultima players from each Gigafinal qualify to enter the Terafinal Champions competition. Until 2002, the two runners-up in each category qualified to enter the Terafinal Challengers competition. Currently ( in 2019 ) anyone scoring 4 or above qualified for the challengers .

=== Terafinal ===
There is 1 final Terafinal competition—The Ultimo's and Ultima's in each age group (including those who were tied on the same score in first place) play in one of the 5 sections depending on age. A contestant can move up to an older age group on request. The sections are: U8, U10, U12, U14 and U18. There are trophies, medals and money given out as prizes depending on the age group.

=== Challengers ===
At the moment this event has 5 age groups the same as the Terafinal. The top two players (no matter what gender) that have not already qualified will go to the Terafinals. Any players tied on the same score which is the highest will go to the tiebreaks.

== List of winners for the oldest age group ==
Year	Winner
1997	Richard Cleveland
1998	Adam Hunt
1999	Thomas Rendle
2000	Lorin D'Costa
2001	Lorin D'Costa
2002	Lorin D'Costa
2003	Lorin D'Costa
2004	Ben Purton
2005	Stephen Gordon
2006	James Hanley
2007	Peter Poobalasingam
2008	Peter Poobalasingam
2009	Félix Ynojosa
2010	Félix Ynojosa
2011	Yang-Fan Zhou
2012	Brandon Clarke
2013	Marcus Harvey
2014	Marcus Harvey
2015	Matthew Wadsworth
2016	Joseph McPhillips
2017	Harry Grieve
2018	Koby Kalavannan
2019	Koby Kalavannan
2022	Yichen Han
2023	Artem Lutsko
2024	Artem Lutsko
2025	Stanley Badacsonyi
