= Modern Defense =

Chess opening

Position: a8 black rook, b8 black knight, c8 black bishop, d8 black queen, e8 black king, f8 black bishop, g8 black knight, h8 black rook, a7 black pawn, b7 black pawn, c7 black pawn, d7 black pawn, e7 black pawn, f7 black pawn, h7 black pawn, g6 black pawn, e4 white pawn, a2 white pawn, b2 white pawn, c2 white pawn, d2 white pawn, f2 white pawn, g2 white pawn, h2 white pawn, a1 white rook, b1 white knight, c1 white bishop, d1 white queen, e1 white king, f1 white bishop, g1 white knight, h1 white rook
- Moves: 1.e4 g6
- ECO: B06
- Parent: King's Pawn Game
- Synonym: Robatsch Defense

The Modern Defense (also known as the Robatsch Defense) is a hypermodern chess opening which usually starts with the opening moves:

1. e4 g6

Black allows White to occupy the center with pawns on d4 and e4, then proceeds to attack and undermine this "ideal" center without attempting to occupy it. The Modern Defense is closely related to the Pirc Defense, the primary difference being that in the Modern, Black delays developing the knight to f6. This delay of attacking White's pawn on e4 gives White the option of blunting the g7-bishop with c2–c3. There are numerous transpositional possibilities between the two openings.

The Encyclopaedia of Chess Openings (ECO) classifies the Modern Defense as code B06, while codes B07 to B09 are assigned to the Pirc. The tenth edition of Modern Chess Openings (1965) grouped the Pirc and Robatsch together as the "Pirc–Robatsch Defense". The opening has been most notably used by British grandmasters Nigel Davies and Colin McNab.

== 2.d4 ==
=== Main line: 2.d4 Bg7 ===
White's strongest response to the Modern Defense is 2.d4, to which Black typically responds 2...Bg7. The main continuations are:

- 3. Nc3 d6 4. f4 c6 5. Nf3 Bg4 (the standard line, ECO B06)
- 3. c4 (ECO A40) d6 4. Nc3 Nc6 5. Be3 e5 6. d5 Nce7 (7.g4 will be answered by 7...f5 8.gxf5 gxf5 9.Qh5+ Ng6 10.exf5 Qh4 11.Qxh4 Nxh4 12.Nb5 Kd8)

Other possibilities include:

- 3.Bc4 (Bishop Attack)
- 3.Bd2 (Westermann Gambit)
- 3.Bd3 (Wind Gambit)
- 3.f4 (Three Pawns Attack)
- 3.g3
- 3.Nf3

=== Fischer's 3.h4!? ===
Bobby Fischer suggested the move 3.h4!? as an unorthodox try against 1...g6 2.d4 Bg7, in his annotation to a game against Pal Benko. (Fischer played 3.Nc3 in the actual game.) The idea is to pry open Black's kingside by h4–h5 followed by hxg6, as ...gxh5 would greatly weaken the cover to Black's king. This idea has even been tried on move 2.

=== Averbakh System ===
Position: a8 black rook, b8 black knight, c8 black bishop, d8 black queen, e8 black king, g8 black knight, h8 black rook, a7 black pawn, b7 black pawn, c7 black pawn, e7 black pawn, f7 black pawn, g7 black bishop, h7 black pawn, d6 black pawn, g6 black pawn, c4 white pawn, d4 white pawn, e4 white pawn, c3 white knight, a2 white pawn, b2 white pawn, f2 white pawn, g2 white pawn, h2 white pawn, a1 white rook, c1 white bishop, d1 white queen, e1 white king, f1 white bishop, g1 white knight, h1 white rook

Averbakh System

The Modern Defense, Averbakh System (ECO A42) can be reached by the lines:

- 1.e4 g6 2.d4 Bg7 3.c4 d6 4.Nc3 (diagram)
- 1.d4 g6 2.c4 Bg7 3.Nc3 d6 4.e4 (diagram)

Possible moves for Black at this point include 4...Nf6, 4...Nc6, 4...e5, and 4...Nd7. The move 4...Nf6 leads to a position of the King's Indian Defense, where White has options 5.Nf3, 5.f3, 5.Be2, 5.f4, and so on.

== Unusual responses ==
The flexibility and toughness of the Modern Defense have provoked some very aggressive responses by White, including the crudely named Monkey's Bum, a typical sequence being 1.e4 g6 2.Bc4 Bg7 3.Qf3. (A more refined version is the Monkey's Bum Deferred, where White plays Bc4 and Qf3 only after developing the queen's knight.)

Regarding Black responses, other unusual openings can be reached after 1.e4 g6. The Hippopotamus Defense is one such system. Another is the Norwegian Defense (also known as the North Sea Defense) which begins 1.e4 g6 2.d4 Nf6 3.e5 Nh5. (If White plays 4.g4, Black retreats the knight with 4...Ng7. On 4.Be2, Black can retreat the knight or gambit a pawn with 4...d6!? If White plays 3.Nc3 instead of 3.e5, Black can transpose to the Pirc Defense with 3...d6 or continue in unconventional fashion with 3...d5!?)

== Transpositions ==
Transpositions are possible after 2.c4, for example a Maróczy Bind results after 2...c5 3.Nf3 Bg7 (or Nc6) 4.d4 cxd4 5.Nxd4 and the Averbakh system is reached after 2...Bg7 3.d4 d6 4.Nc3. After 2.Nf3, Black can play 2...c5, transposing to the Sicilian Defense, or 2...Bg7. Following 2.Nc3, Black can transpose to a closed Sicilian with 2...c5 or play 2...Bg7.

== Kavalek vs. Suttles ==
In the following game played at the Nice Olympiad in 1974, Canadian GM Duncan Suttles, one of the Modern's leading exponents, defeats Czech-American GM Lubomir Kavalek:

1. e4 g6 2. d4 d6 3. Nf3 Bg7 4. Be2 Nf6 5. Nc3 (Pirc Defense by transposition) 5... a6 6. a4 0-0 7. 0-0 b6 8. Re1 Bb7 9. Bc4 e6 10. Bf4 Nbd7 11. Qd2 b5! (initiating a deep combination; Suttles later remarked that Kavalek has occupied the center and developed his pieces in the manner advocated by Fred Reinfeld, yet now stands worse) 12. axb5 axb5 13. Rxa8 Qxa8 14. Bxb5 Bxe4 15. Nxe4 Nxe4 16. Rxe4 Qxe4 17. Bxd7 Ra8 18. h4 Qb7! (despite his material advantage, White is in trouble; note that his bishop on d7 is nearly trapped) [it is true that the bishop is trapped, however according to Stockfish, White has nothing to fear at this point; for instance after 19.b4 c6 20.Bxe6 fxe6 21.Bxd6, white is at least slightly better] 19. d5 e5 20. Bh6 Qxb2 21. h5 Ra1+ 22. Kh2 Qb1 23. Bxg7 Qh1+ 24. Kg3 Kxg7 25. Bh3 Qc1 26. h6+ Kf6 27. c4? (27.Kh4 or 27.Qxc1 should lead to a draw) Qxd2 28. Nxd2 Kg5 29. Ne4+ Kxh6 30. Bd7 f5 31. Nf6 Ra7 32. Bb5 g5 33. Ng8+ Kg7 34. Ne7 Kf6 35. Nc6 Ra3+ 36. Kh2 h5 37. Nb8 h4 38. Na6 g4 39. Nxc7 Ra2 40. Kg1 g3 41. fxg3 hxg3 42. Kf1 e4 0–1

== Variations ==
=== Monkey's Bum ===
Position: a8 black rook, b8 black knight, c8 black bishop, d8 black queen, e8 black king, g8 black knight, h8 black rook, a7 black pawn, b7 black pawn, c7 black pawn, d7 black pawn, f7 black pawn, g7 black bishop, h7 black pawn, e6 black pawn, g6 black pawn, c4 white bishop, e4 white pawn, c3 white knight, f3 white queen, a2 white pawn, b2 white pawn, c2 white pawn, e2 white knight, f2 white pawn, g2 white pawn, h2 white pawn, a1 white rook, c1 white bishop, e1 white king, h1 white rook

Position after 1.e4 g6 2.Bc4 Bg7 3.Qf3 e6 4.d4 Bxd4 5.Ne2 Bg7 6.Nbc3

The Monkey's Bum is a variation of the Modern Defense. Although it may also be loosely defined as any approach against the Modern Defense involving an early Bc4 and Qf3, threatening "Scholar's mate", it is strictly defined by the sequence of moves:

1.e4 g6 2.Bc4 Bg7 3.Qf3 e6 4.d4 Bxd4 5.Ne2 Bg7 6.Nbc3 (diagram)

It was discovered and championed by IM Nigel Povah in the 1970s during a wave of popularity of the Modern Defense. In 1972, after Keene and Botterill published their book The Modern Defence, Povah began looking for a response to the opening. He happened across the game Ljubojević–Keene, Palma de Mallorca 1971, which started 1.e4 g6 2.d4 d6 3.Bc4 Bg7 4.f4 Nf6 and eventually ended in a draw. Intrigued by Ljubojević's early Bc4, Povah began investigating a rapid assault on f7 with 3.Qf3. When he showed the first few moves to Ken Coates, a friend at Leeds, Coates declared, "If that works then I'm a monkey's bum!" The name stuck. The Monkey's Bum first appeared in print five years later in the British Chess Magazine. Povah wrote an article on the theory of the Monkey's Bum, in which he stated that although he had never yet lost with the variation, it was still "in its infancy".

In playing the Monkey's Bum, White's idea is to gain active piece play by a sacrifice of the d4-pawn, much like the Smith–Morra Gambit. In practice, however, such compensation proves tenuous in the Monkey's Bum proper, as evidenced by the following game:

Nigel Povah vs. Shimon Kagan, Birmingham 1977
1.e4 g6 2.Bc4 Bg7 3.Qf3 e6 4.d4 Bxd4 5.Ne2 Bg7 6.Nbc3 Nc6 7.Bf4 Ne5 8.Bxe5 Bxe5 9.Qe3 d6 10.0–0–0 Bd7 11.f4 Bg7 12.g4 a6 13.h4 b5 14.Bb3 a5 15.a4 bxa4 16.Nxa4 h5 17.e5 Nh6 18.exd6 Nxg4 19.Qc5 c6 20.Nd4 Bxd4 21.Rxd4 0–0 22.Nb6 Rb8 23.Nxd7 Qxd7 24.Ba4 Qb7 25.b3 Qb6 26.Qxb6 Rxb6 27.Rc4 Rd8 28.Bxc6 Rxd6 29.Bf3 Ne3 30.Ra4 Rb4 31.Rxa5 Rxf4 32.Bb7 Rb6 33.Ba8 Nf5 34.Kb2 Nxh4 35.Ka3 Nf5 36.c4 Nd4 37.Rb1 Nc2+ 38.Ka2 Nb4+ 39.Kb2 Rb8 40.c5 Nd3+ 0–1

=== Monkey's Bum Deferred ===
Position: a8 black rook, b8 black knight, c8 black bishop, d8 black queen, e8 black king, g8 black knight, h8 black rook, a7 black pawn, b7 black pawn, e7 black pawn, f7 black pawn, g7 black bishop, h7 black pawn, c6 black pawn, d6 black pawn, g6 black pawn, c4 white bishop, d4 white pawn, e4 white pawn, c3 white knight, f3 white queen, a2 white pawn, b2 white pawn, c2 white pawn, f2 white pawn, g2 white pawn, h2 white pawn, a1 white rook, c1 white bishop, e1 white king, g1 white knight, h1 white rook

Position after 1.e4 g6 2.d4 Bg7 3.Nc3 c6 4.Bc4 d6 5.Qf3

A much more popular and respected approach against the Modern Defense is the Monkey's Bum Deferred. It has been employed by such notable grandmasters as John Nunn, Sergei Rublevsky and Judit Polgár. It is distinct from the Monkey's Bum proper in that the attempt to create the "Scholar's mate" threat with Bc4 and Qf3 only occurs after White has developed their queen's knight. A typical sequence of the Monkey's Bum Deferred is:

1.e4 g6 2.d4 Bg7 3.Nc3 c6 4.Bc4 d6 5.Qf3 (diagram)

Usually White will castle kingside and undertake an attack by means of the pawn thrust f2–f4.

This game is an example of a time when the Monkey's Bum Deferred worked. Games like this caused the opening to reach a wider audience of chess players:

Judit Polgár vs. Alexei Shirov, Donner Memorial, Amsterdam, 1995
1.e4 g6 2.d4 Bg7 3.Nc3 c6 4.Bc4 d6 5.Qf3 e6 6.Nge2 b5 7.Bb3 a5 8.a3 Ba6 9.d5 cxd5 10.exd5 e5 11.Ne4 Qc7 12.c4 bxc4 13.Ba4+ Nd7 14.N2c3 Ke7 15.Nxd6 Qxd6 16.Ne4 Qxd5 17.Bg5+ Ndf6 18.Rd1 Qb7 19.Rd7+ Qxd7 20.Bxd7 h6 21.Qd1 1–0

=== Norwegian Defense ===
Position: a8 black rook, b8 black knight, c8 black bishop, d8 black queen, e8 black king, f8 black bishop, h8 black rook, a7 black pawn, b7 black pawn, c7 black pawn, d7 black pawn, e7 black pawn, f7 black pawn, h7 black pawn, f6 black knight, g6 black pawn, d4 white pawn, e4 white pawn, a2 white pawn, b2 white pawn, c2 white pawn, f2 white pawn, g2 white pawn, h2 white pawn, a1 white rook, b1 white knight, c1 white bishop, d1 white queen, e1 white king, f1 white bishop, g1 white knight, h1 white rook

North Sea Variation: 1.e4 g6 2.d4 Nf6

The North Sea Variation or Norwegian Defense is a line in the Modern Defense complex that occurs after moves: 1.e4 g6 2.d4 Nf6 (diagram). A variant in the Norwegian Defense occurs after moves:

1.e4 g6 2.d4 Nf6 3.e5 Nh5

Magnus Carlsen calls this variant the "Norwegian Rat".

According to Jim Bickford, one of the characteristics of this defense is the "cork-screw" maneuver the knight makes by traveling to the second rank via f6 and h5. In the introduction to his monograph, Bickford quotes the late Tony Miles as saying "The black knights are better on the second rank – a shame it takes two moves for them to get there." This joke is a reference to the fact that black knights on the second rank would likely occupy the squares d7 or e7; however, in the uncommon openings favored by Miles they tend to wind up on less characteristic squares along that rank, such as f7, g7, c7 and b7.

The Norwegian Defense, Norwegian Gambit (1.e4 g6 2.d4 Nf6 3.e5 Nh5 4.Be2 d6?!) was most famously played by Magnus Carlsen against Michael Adams at the 2010 Khanty-Mansiysk Olympiad.
