= Maximilián Ujtelky =

Slovak chess player

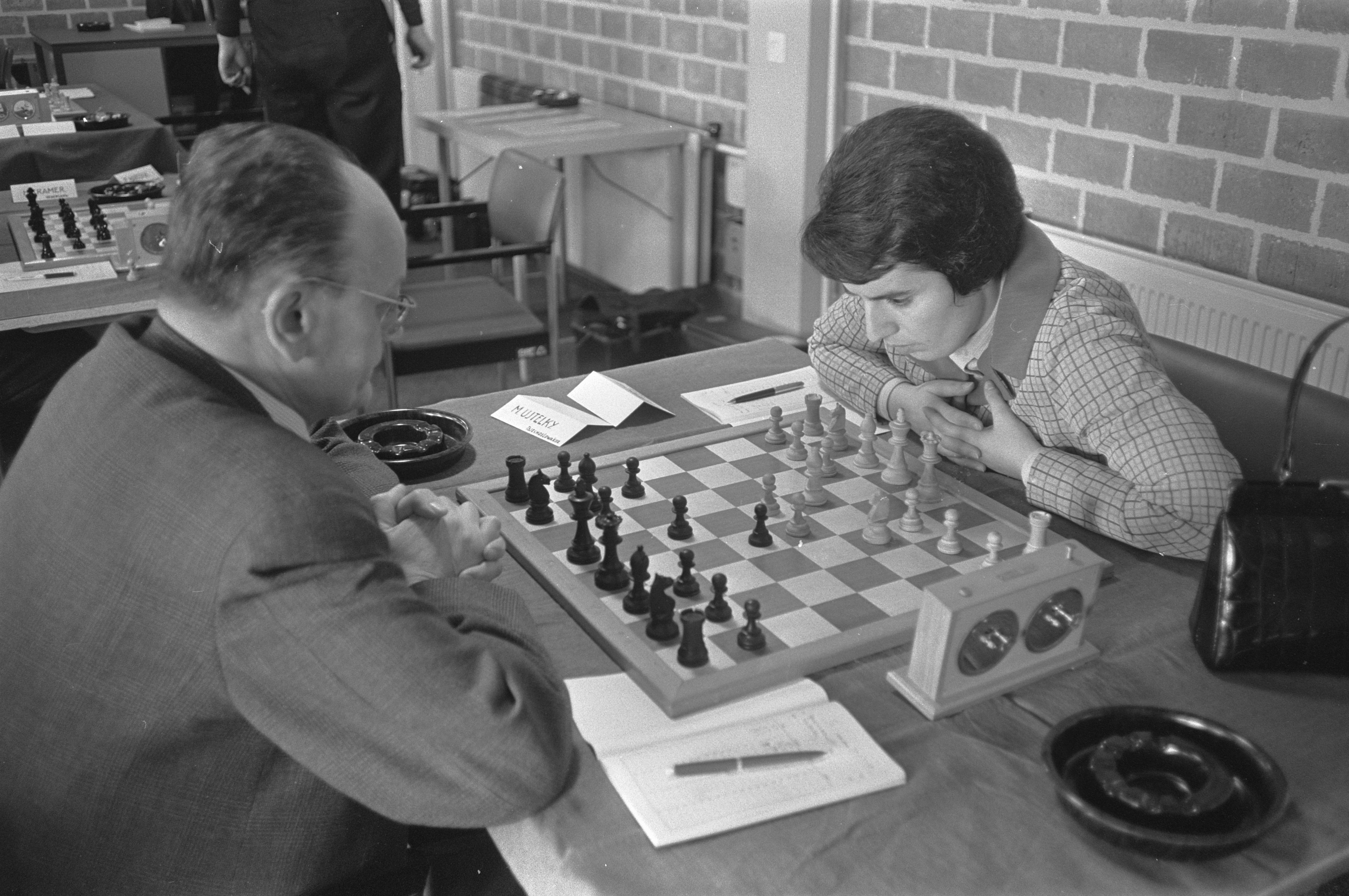
Ujtelky vs. Nona Gaprindashvili (1969)

Maximilián Samuel Rudolf Ujtelky (20 April 1915 – 12 December 1979) was a Slovak chess master and theoretician of Hungarian origin.

== Life and career ==
Ujtelky was born on 20 April 1915 in Spišská Nová Ves. He was a direct descendant of famous Hungarian composer Franz Liszt, and his original last name was Ujteleky.

He shared 1st with Jiří Fichtl in the Czechoslovak Chess Championship at Ostrava 1960, but lost to him in a playoff match for the title. He took 9th at Budapest 1960 (zonal).

He thrice represented Czechoslovakia at the Chess Olympiads in Amsterdam 1954, Leipzig 1960, and Havana 1966; twice in the European Men's Team Chess Championship at Vienna 1957 (won team bronze medal), Oberhausen 1961 (won individual bronze medal), and several times in friendly matches.

He was awarded the International Master title in 1961.

His name is attached to the Ujtelky System (b6, Bb7, g6, Bg7, d6, e6, Nd7, Ne7), an opening similar to the Hippopotamus Defence. He was nicknamed Hero of the Hippo.
