= Nigel Povah =

British chess player (born 1952)

Personal information
- Full name: Nigel Edward Povah
- Born: 17 July 1952 (age 73) Clapham, London, England

Chess career
- Country: England
- Title: International Master (1983), International Correspondence Chess Grandmaster (1989)
- FIDE rating: 2245 (December 2021)
- Peak rating: 2385 (January 1980)
- ICCF rating: 2564 (July 1996)
- ICCF peak rating: 2605 (July 1991)

Nigel Edward Povah (born 17 July 1952 in Clapham, London) is a British chess player. He is an International Master at over-the-board chess and a Grandmaster at correspondence chess. Povah is the author of Chess Training, English: Four Knights, How to play the English and co-author of the Sicilian: Lasker-Pelikan. He is reckoned to be the UK's strongest correspondence chess player since Jonathan Penrose. Having trained as an Occupational Psychologist he started his own consulting business, Assessment & Development Consultants, which he ran for nearly 30 years before selling the business and retiring in June 2017. He also co-authored or co-edited several books relating to his field of work, namely Assessment and Development Centres, Succeeding at Assessment Centres for Dummies and Assessment Centres and Global Talent Management. He is married and lives in Guildford, Surrey.
