= Karl Robatsch =

Austrian chess grandmaster (1929–2000)

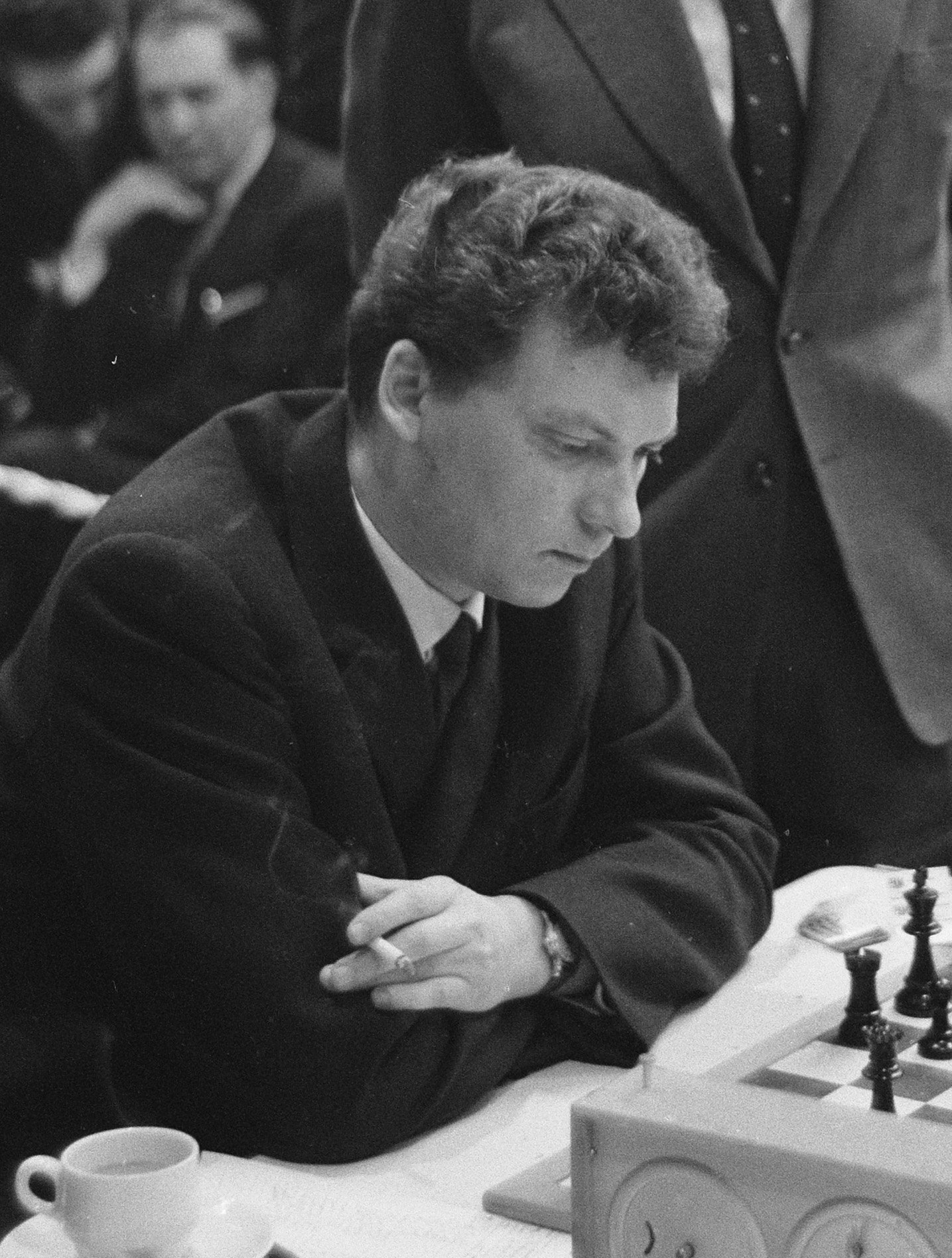
- Robatsch in 1961

Personal information
- Born: October 14, 1929 (Note: Early FIDE records had 1928 as Robatsch's birth year until it was corrected after January 1993 (as seen in the FIDE ratings lists). Sources such as Sunnucks 1970 and Gaige 1987 also give the incorrect year.) Klagenfurt, Austria
- Died: September 19, 2000 (aged 70)

Chess career
- Country: Austria
- Title: Grandmaster (1961)
- Peak rating: 2460 (July 1971)

Karl Robatsch (October 14, 1929 in Klagenfurt – September 19, 2000) was a leading Austrian chess player and a noted botanist.

He moved to Graz at the age of 17 to become a student and often frequented the Mountainside Café, a popular meeting place for chess players. As he already had a recognisable chess talent, he joined a local club 'SK Gemeinde' (Municipal chess club) and quickly advanced to master standard.

== A team player ==
Becoming an International Master (IM) in 1957 and a Grandmaster (GM) in 1961, Robatsch dedicated much of his life to serving Austrian chess, representing the nation at eleven Chess Olympiads and one European Team Chess Championship. Up until his last Olympiad in 1994, he played first board on every occasion and returned some impressive results. At the 1960 Leipzig Olympiad, he astounded the chess world by scoring 84.4% and taking the board 1 gold medal, while still only an IM. This was also the year that he became Austrian champion.

== Tournament record ==
While Robatsch played competitively over five decades, the high points of his international tournament career mostly occurred in the late 1950s and early 1960s. He was a winner at Madrid in 1961 (with Borislav Milić) and achieved outright or shared second place at Kapfenberg 1955, Varna 1957, Utrecht 1961 and Beverwijk 1962. At Halle in 1963, a zonal qualifying tournament for the world championship, he finished with a creditable tie for third (after Lajos Portisch and Bent Larsen, level with Borislav Ivkov).

Later, he took a share of second place at Venice 1969, and placed third at Olot 1972, Costa Brava 1973 and Vienna 1979. He continued to play to a good standard into the late 1990s.

== Style and contributions to opening theory ==
Position: a8 black rook, b8 black knight, c8 black bishop, d8 black queen, e8 black king, g8 black knight, h8 black rook, a7 black pawn, b7 black pawn, c7 black pawn, d7 black pawn, e7 black pawn, f7 black pawn, g7 black bishop, h7 black pawn, g6 black pawn, d4 white pawn, e4 white pawn, a2 white pawn, b2 white pawn, c2 white pawn, f2 white pawn, g2 white pawn, h2 white pawn, a1 white rook, b1 white knight, c1 white bishop, d1 white queen, e1 white king, f1 white bishop, g1 white knight, h1 white rook

Robatsch or Modern Defence

Robatsch displayed a highly combinative playing style in his younger days and adopted a more positional approach later in life. His opening play was often punctuated with experimental moves and this led to some lively and historically important games. The system of opening moves commencing 1. e4 g6 2. d4 Bg7 (see diagram), first seen in the 16th century, became a playground that Robatsch returned to time and time again when he had the black pieces.

Following preparatory moves such as Nc6 or d6, Black characteristically delays the development of the kingside knight in favour of an early challenge in the centre with e5. An alternative configuration, with which he drew with ex-world champion Max Euwe, involved playing an early c5 and d5. Other strategies employed by Black are likely to transpose to lines of the Pirc Defence, King's Indian Defence or Modern Benoni. Robatsch duly revived, developed and popularised the system and it became widely known as the 'Robatsch Defence' throughout the 1960s, 70s and even into the 1980s. The tenth edition of Modern Chess Openings (1965) grouped the Pirc and Robatsch together as the "Pirc–Robatsch Defense". Although some opening books still reference it this way, a more common designation is the Modern Defence.

He was also known for his offbeat version of the Centre Counter, or Scandinavian Defence as it is now best known.

== Parallel career ==
Robatsch may have hindered his further development as a chess player by sharing his love of chess with a parallel career in botany. As an esteemed orchidologist, he was awarded the title of 'Professor' for his outstanding research work in the classification of different species and sub-species of orchid.

Karl Robatsch died in 2000, following a long fight with throat and stomach cancer.

== Notable games ==
- M Euwe vs K Robatsch, Varna 1962, Modern Defense: Queen Pawn Fianchetto (B06), ½–½
- J Durao vs K Robatsch, Olympiad 1960, Modern Defense: Averbakh Variation (A42), 0–1
