= St. George Defence =

Chess opening

Position: a8 black rook, b8 black knight, c8 black bishop, d8 black queen, e8 black king, f8 black bishop, g8 black knight, h8 black rook, b7 black pawn, c7 black pawn, d7 black pawn, e7 black pawn, f7 black pawn, g7 black pawn, h7 black pawn, a6 black pawn, e4 white pawn, a2 white pawn, b2 white pawn, c2 white pawn, d2 white pawn, f2 white pawn, g2 white pawn, h2 white pawn, a1 white rook, b1 white knight, c1 white bishop, d1 white queen, e1 white king, f1 white bishop, g1 white knight, h1 white rook
- Moves: 1.e4 a6
- ECO: B00
- Named after: English patron St. George
- Parent: King's Pawn Game
- Synonyms: Baker's Defence; Birmingham Defence; Basman Counterattack

The St. George Defence (also known as the Baker's Defence, Birmingham Defence, or Basman Counterattack) is an unorthodox chess opening for Black. The opening begins with the moves:

1. e4 a6

The St. George Defence is given ECO code B00 as a King's Pawn Opening.

== History ==
The first known chess game involving the St. George was a simultaneous game between an English amateur, J. Baker, and the first official World Chess Champion, Wilhelm Steinitz, on 11 December 1868. The game was won by Baker. The advocates of the opening are generally players willing to sacrifice the centre in order to attack from the flank, and to avoid theory. Michael Basman was known to play the St. George, as did Tony Miles.

In perhaps its most famous appearance, Miles defeated reigning World Champion Anatoly Karpov in the 1980 European Team Chess Championship in Skara, Sweden. The opening also acquired the name of "Birmingham Defence" at this time, after Miles's hometown.

Boris Spassky also played the St. George Defence, albeit by transposition, in the 22nd game of his 1966 world championship match against World Champion Tigran Petrosian. That game began 1.d4 b5 (the Polish Defence) 2.e4 Bb7 3.f3 a6 (transposing to the St. George). This was an inauspicious outing for the defence, however: Petrosian won, giving him the 12 points needed to retain his title.

== Theory ==
Position: a8 black rook, b8 black knight, d8 black queen, e8 black king, f8 black bishop, h8 black rook, b7 black bishop, c7 black pawn, d7 black pawn, f7 black pawn, g7 black pawn, h7 black pawn, a6 black pawn, e6 black pawn, f6 black knight, b5 black pawn, d4 white pawn, e4 white pawn, d3 white bishop, f3 white knight, a2 white pawn, b2 white pawn, c2 white pawn, f2 white pawn, g2 white pawn, h2 white pawn, a1 white rook, b1 white knight, c1 white bishop, d1 white queen, f1 white rook, g1 white king

Main line continuation after 3. Nf3.

The major lines in the opening start with 1.e4 a6 2.d4 b5 and then branch. The main line continues 3.Nf3 Bb7 4.Bd3 e6 5.0-0 Nf6. Another important line is the Three Pawns Attack, sometimes called the St. George Gambit, which continues 3.c4 e6!? 4.cxb5 axb5 5.Bxb5 Bb7 (Black can also play 3...Bb7 and offer the b-pawn for the more valuable White e-pawn).

The Neo-Spanish Variation is in imitation of the Spanish Game. The main line runs 1. e4 a6 2. d4 b5 3. Nf3 Bb7 4. Bd3 d6 5. O-O Nf6 6. Nbd2 Nbd7 7. Re1 e5, with play potentially continuing 8. c3 c5 9. Bc2 Be7 10. h3 O-O where the opening has simply become the Breyer Defense of the Spanish Game. This variation is referred to by Eric Schiller in Unorthodox Chess Openings.

The St. George is also sometimes used to prevent a White bishop from occupying b5 before continuing as in French Defence, with lines such as 2...e6 3.Nf3 d5 transposing into a hybrid of the St. George Defence and the French Defence, with sharp play and quick queenside attack opportunities in the corresponding Advance (4.e5 c5 5.c3 Nc6 6.Bd3 Bd7 7.0-0 cxd4 8.cxd4 Qb6 9.Be2 Nge7 10.Nc3 Nf5 and Black is up space but isn't castled, and the Black Queen is vulnerable to the attack 11.Na4), Exchange (4.exd5 exd5 5.Bd3 Bd6 6.0-0 Ne7 [6...Nf6? 7.Re1+±] 7.Re1 0-0), and Two Knights Variations (4.Nc3 Nf6 5.e5 Nfd7 6.Ne2 c5 7.c3 Nc6 8.a3 Be7 or 8...Qb6 and do not castle, as that runs right into White's kingside attack) that result. Play can also transpose to the French Defense: Tarrasch, Modern System, 4.Ngf3, and then to the Open Tarrasch, Euwe-Keres Line, 4...a6, after playing the theoretical move, 4...c5.

Much of the theoretical work on the defence was done by the English IM Michael Basman.

== Notable games ==
Anatoly Karpov vs. Tony Miles, European Team Chess Championship, Skara 1980:
1.e4 a6 2.d4 b5 3.Nf3 Bb7 4.Bd3 Nf6 5.Qe2 e6 6.a4 c5 7.dxc5 Bxc5 8.Nbd2 b4 9.e5 Nd5 10.Ne4 Be7 11.0-0 Nc6 12.Bd2 Qc7 13.c4 bxc3 14.Nxc3 Nxc3 15.Bxc3 Nb4 16.Bxb4 Bxb4 17.Rac1 Qb6 18.Be4 0-0!? 19.Ng5 (19.Bxh7+!? is a dangerous sacrifice) h6 20.Bh7+ Kh8 21.Bb1 Be7 22.Ne4 Rac8 23.Qd3 Rxc1 24.Rxc1 Qxb2 25.Re1 Qxe5 26.Qxd7 Bb4 27.Re3 Qd5 28.Qxd5 Bxd5 29.Nc3 Rc8 30.Ne2 g5 31.h4 Kg7 32.hxg5 hxg5 33.Bd3 a5 34.Rg3 Kf6 35.Rg4 Bd6 36.Kf1 Be5 37.Ke1 Rh8 38.f4 gxf4 39.Nxf4 Bc6 40.Ne2 Rh1+ 41.Kd2 Rh2 42.g3 Bf3 43.Rg8 Rg2 44.Ke1 Bxe2 45.Bxe2 Rxg3 46.Ra8 Bc7 0–1

== See also ==
- Hypermodernism (chess)
