= Michael Basman =

English chess player (1946–2022)

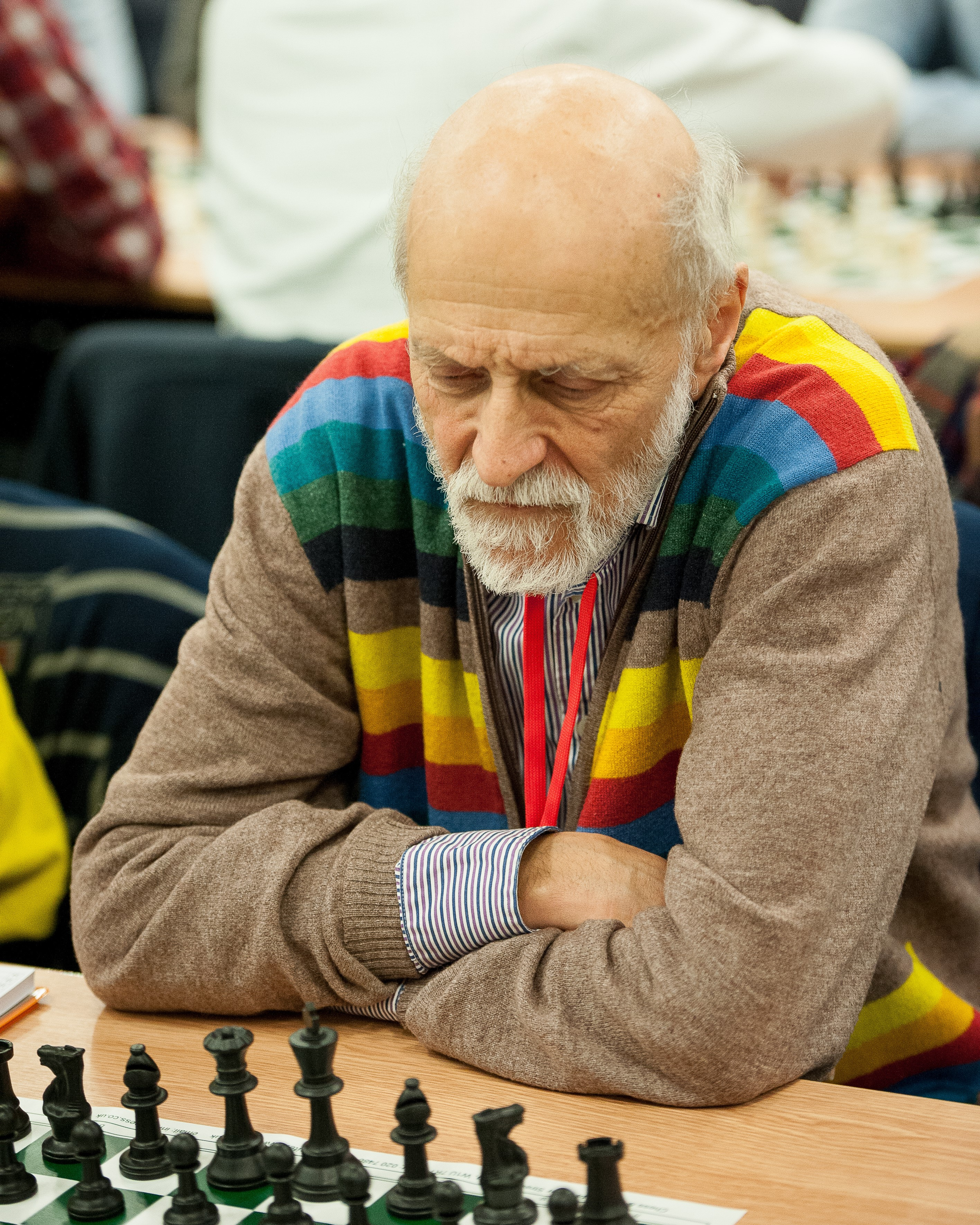
- Basman in 2016

Personal information
- Born: Michael John Basman; 16 March 1946 St Pancras, London, England
- Died: 26 October 2022 (aged 76) Carshalton, England
- Spouse: Berdjouhi Kuiumdjian (div. 1986)
- Children: 1

Chess career
- Country: England
- Title: International Master (1980)
- Peak rating: 2410 (July 1971)

Michael John Basman (16 March 1946 – 26 October 2022) was an English chess player and author. He was awarded the title of International Master in 1980.

== Chess career ==
Once described by Murray Chandler as "the most bizarre player in the universe", Basman was well known for employing unorthodox openings. Among these were the following:

- The Grob (for White), which begins with g4. Basman wrote The Killer Grob (1989) about this opening.
- The Creepy Crawly (for White), which begins with h3, followed by a3 and c4.
- The Borg Defence (for Black), which employs g5 as a response to e4. As the name suggests, this is essentially the mirror image of the Grob. ("Borg" is "Grob" spelt backwards.)
- The St. George Defence (for Black), which employs a6 as a response to e4. Basman wrote Play the St. George (1983) and The New St. George (1993) about this opening.

Basman used the Grob to defeat John Nunn in 1978 and the Borg Defence to defeat Jon Speelman in 1980.

Possibly his greatest tournament success was when he tied for first place in the British Chess Championship of 1973, although he lost the play-off match with William Hartston.

- Andersson vs. Basman
- (Hastings, 1974–75)

Position: g1 white king, f1 white rook, c1 white rook, h2 white pawn, g2 white bishop, f2 white pawn, e2 white pawn, b2 white pawn, a2 white pawn, g3 white pawn, c3 white knight, b3 white queen, f4 white bishop, d4 white pawn, e5 white knight, d5 black pawn, h6 black pawn, f6 black knight, b6 black pawn, a6 black pawn, g7 black pawn, f7 black pawn, e7 black bishop, c7 black pawn, b7 black bishop, a7 black rook, g8 black king, f8 black rook, d8 black queen, b8 black knight

Position after 12.Qb3

Position: g1 white rook, h2 white king, g2 white bishop, d2 white rook, b2 white pawn, h3 white pawn, e3 white pawn, c3 white knight, b3 white queen, a3 white pawn, g4 white pawn, f4 white bishop, d4 white pawn, f5 white pawn, e5 white knight, d5 black pawn, h6 black pawn, f6 black knight, b6 black pawn, a6 black pawn, g7 black pawn, f7 black pawn, e7 black bishop, c7 black pawn, b7 black bishop, a7 black rook, g8 black king, f8 black rook, d8 black queen, b8 black knight

Position after 24.Rg1 – Basman's position has not changed in the last 12 moves

During the 1974–75 Hastings tournament, Basman (playing Black) defeated the Swedish grandmaster Ulf Andersson in a match that became known as the "Immortal Waiting Game". After the twelfth move, Basman shuffled his bishop, king, and queen back and forth for twelve moves, not changing his position at all. Andersson overextended himself, and Basman won.

In 1975, England contested a match over ten boards against France in Luton. Basman played board one, ahead of John Nunn and Jon Speelman.

In 1996, Basman created the UK Chess Challenge, a tournament for juniors of all standards and ages progressing over four stages, now advertised as the biggest chess tournament in the world. Raymond Keene once wrote, referring to Basman's promotion of youth chess, "Michael Basman is in many ways the most important person in British chess."

== Personal life ==
Basman was born in St Pancras, London, on 16 March 1946, the third of four children of John Onik Basman, an Armenian immigrant, and his English wife, Bridgette Bettina Basman, née Marks. John Basman had shortened the family name from Basmadjian after arriving in England. The family knew the singer Cleo Laine, who worked as a babysitter for the young Michael.

After graduating with a degree in history from the University of Leeds, Basman received a scholarship to study medicine in Yerevan in the Armenian SSR. However, an aversion to blood and operations caused him to abandon his studies. Whilst living in Yerevan, he learnt Armenian, won the local chess championship, and met a fellow student named Berdjouhi Kuiumdjian, whom he married. They had one child together (a son named Antranig Basman), but divorced in 1986.

After returning to England, Basman worked as a computer programmer at the Chessington Computer Centre.

His creation of the UK Chess Challenge in 1996 led to a dispute with the Inland Revenue, which claimed he ought to be collecting VAT on entry fees. In 2016, he was found to be personally liable for the back taxes due, and was ordered to pay £300,000. He was declared bankrupt the following year and lost control of the UK Chess Challenge.

He stood as an independent candidate in the constituency of Kingston and Surbiton in the 2017 general election. His manifesto was described by Raymond Keene as "a curious blend of selective support for Jeremy Corbyn-style intervention combined with extreme libertarianism". He finished last of seven candidates, with 100 votes (0.2%).

He died in Carshalton on 26 October 2022, at the age of 76, from pancreatic cancer.

== Publications ==
- Play the St. George, 1983, ISBN 0-08-029718-8
- Chess Openings, 1987, ISBN 0-946284-74-1
- The Killer Grob, 1989, ISBN 0-08-037131-0
- Batsford Chess Course, 1990, ISBN 0-7134-6098-9
- Batsford Second Chess Course, 1992, ISBN 0-7134-6475-5
- The New St. George, 1993, ISBN 1-85744-019-6
- Chess, 1999, ISBN 0-340-73649-6
- Chess for Kids, 2001, ISBN 0-7894-6540-X
- Chess for Beginners, 2021, ISBN 0-241-53843-2
